= Obecnice =

- Municipality
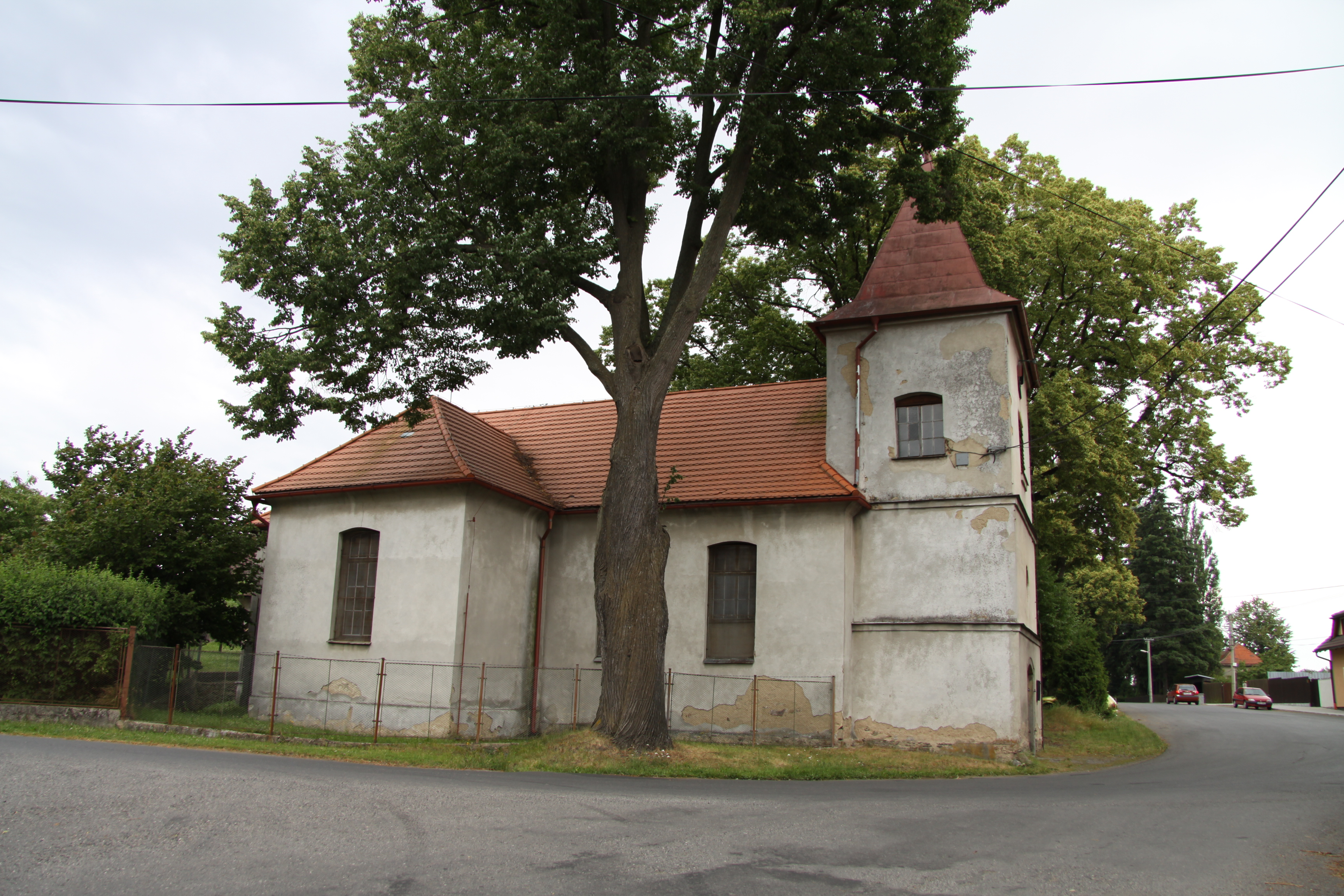
- Church of Saints Simon and Jude

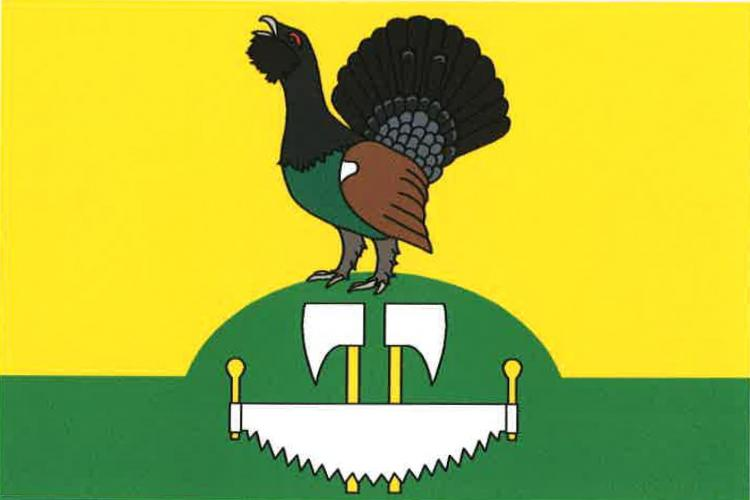
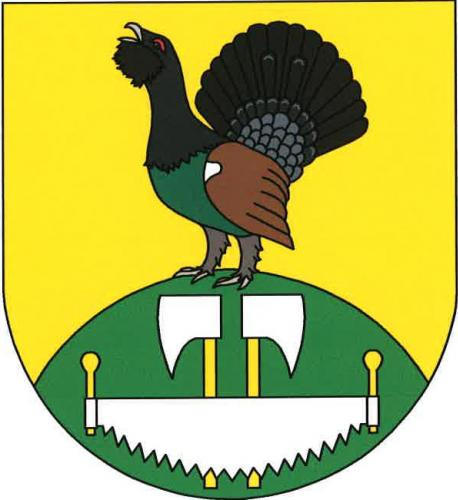
- Flag Coat of arms

- Location in the Czech Republic
- Coordinates: 49°42′58″N 13°56′50″E
- Country: Czech Republic
- Region: Central Bohemian
- District: Příbram
- First mentioned: 1394

Area
  - Total: 51.45 km^{2} (19.86 sq mi)
- Elevation: 520 m (1,710 ft)

Population (2026-01-01)
  - Total: 1,260
  - Density: 24.5/km^{2} (63.4/sq mi)
- Time zone: UTC+1 (CET)
  - Summer (DST): UTC+2 (CEST)
- Postal code: 262 21
- Website: www.obecnice.cz

Obecnice is a municipality and village in Příbram District in the Central Bohemian Region of the Czech Republic. It has about 1,300 inhabitants.

== Administrative division ==
Obecnice consists of two municipal parts (in brackets population according to the 2021 census):

- Obecnice (1,102)
- Oseč (106)

== Etymology ==
The name is derived from the word obec (i.e. 'municipality', 'commune'). The village could be founded on the communal pastures or at a communal inn.

== Geography ==
Obecnice is located about 5 kilometres (3 mi) northwest of Příbram and 48 km (30 mi) southwest of Prague. It lies in a hilly landscape of the Brdy Highlands. The highest point is the Tok mountain at 865 m (2,838 ft), which is the highest peak of the entire Brdy Highlands. The stream Obecnický potok flows through the municipality. In the municipality are two reservoirs: Pilská and Obecnice. Most of the territory is forested.

== History ==
The first written mention of Obecnice is from 1394. The village of Oseč was first mentioned in 1216. Both villages belonged to the Příbram estate, owned by the Prague bishopric. In 1421, during the Hussite Wars, the Příbram estate was acquired by the Zajíc of Valdek family. They owned the estate until 1544, but then it often changed hands. In 1603, Obecnice was annexed to the Dobříš estate.

== Demographics ==
Historical population

Year	Pop.	±%
1869	1,789	—
1880	2,015	+12.6%
1890	2,248	+11.6%
1900	2,277	+1.3%
1910	1,858	−18.4%

Year	Pop.	±%
1921	1,653	−11.0%
1930	1,590	−3.8%
1950	1,217	−23.5%
1961	1,251	+2.8%
1970	1,206	−3.6%

Year	Pop.	±%
1980	1,131	−6.2%
1991	1,111	−1.8%
2001	1,182	+6.4%
2011	1,222	+3.4%
2021	1,208	−1.1%

Source: Censuses

== Transport ==
There are no railways or major roads passing through the municipality.

== Sights ==
The main landmark of Obecnice is the Church of Saints Simon and Jude. It is a simple rural church, built in the first half of the 19th century on the site of an older church.
