= Bratkovice =

- Municipality
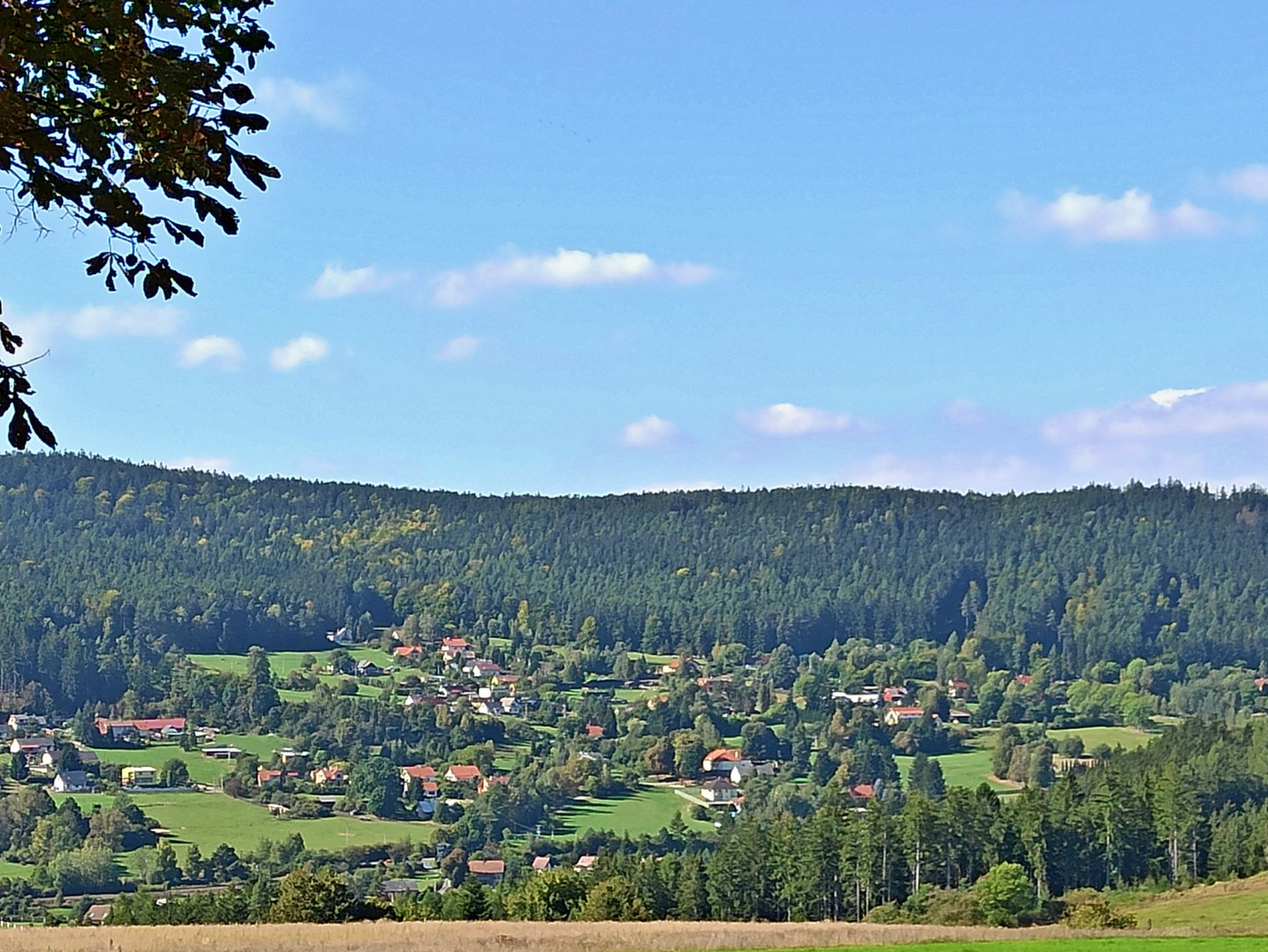
- View from the east

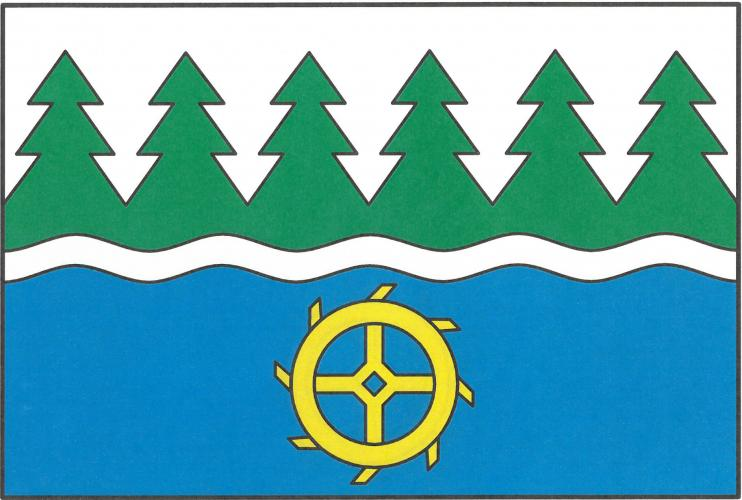
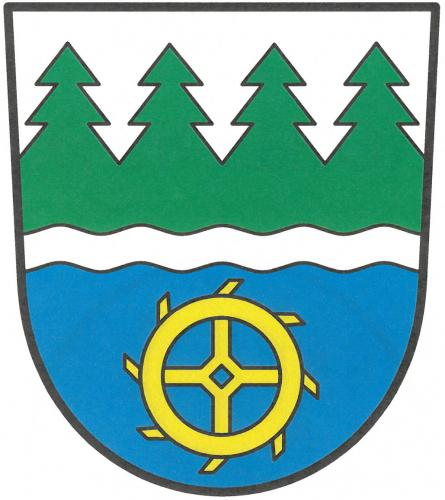
- Flag Coat of arms

- Location in the Czech Republic
- Coordinates: 49°44′26″N 13°59′56″E
- Country: Czech Republic
- Region: Central Bohemian
- District: Příbram
- First mentioned: 1394

Area
  - Total: 3.96 km^{2} (1.53 sq mi)
- Elevation: 446 m (1,463 ft)

Population (2026-01-01)
  - Total: 334
  - Density: 84.3/km^{2} (218/sq mi)
- Time zone: UTC+1 (CET)
  - Summer (DST): UTC+2 (CEST)
- Postal code: 262 23
- Website: www.bratkovice.cz

Bratkovice is a municipality and village in Příbram District in the Central Bohemian Region of the Czech Republic. It has about 300 inhabitants.

== Administrative division ==
Bratkovice consists of two municipal parts (in brackets population according to the 2021 census):

- Bratkovice (93)
- Dominikální Paseky (219)

== Etymology ==
The initial name of the village was probably Bratrkovice. The name was derived from the surname Bratřek, meaning "the village of Bratřek's people".

== Geography ==
Bratkovice is located about 6 kilometres (4 mi) north of Příbram and 44 km (27 mi) southwest of Prague. It lies in the Brdy Highlands. The highest point is at 654 metres (2,146 ft) above sea level. The municipality is situated on the left bank of the Litavka River.

== History ==
The first written mention of Bratkovice is from 1394. The village of Dominikální Paseky was founded in the 17th century as a result of the development of mining and processing of iron ore in the area.

== Demographics ==
Historical population

Year	Pop.	±%
1869	677	—
1880	679	+0.3%
1890	746	+9.9%
1900	753	+0.9%
1910	768	+2.0%

Year	Pop.	±%
1921	702	−8.6%
1930	660	−6.0%
1950	504	−23.6%
1961	463	−8.1%
1970	403	−13.0%

Year	Pop.	±%
1980	338	−16.1%
1991	255	−24.6%
2001	259	+1.6%
2011	308	+18.9%
2021	312	+1.3%

Source: Censuses

== Transport ==
Bratkovice is located on the railway line Beroun–Strakonice via Příbram.

== Sights ==
There are no protected cultural monuments in the municipality.
