= Lochovice =

- Municipality
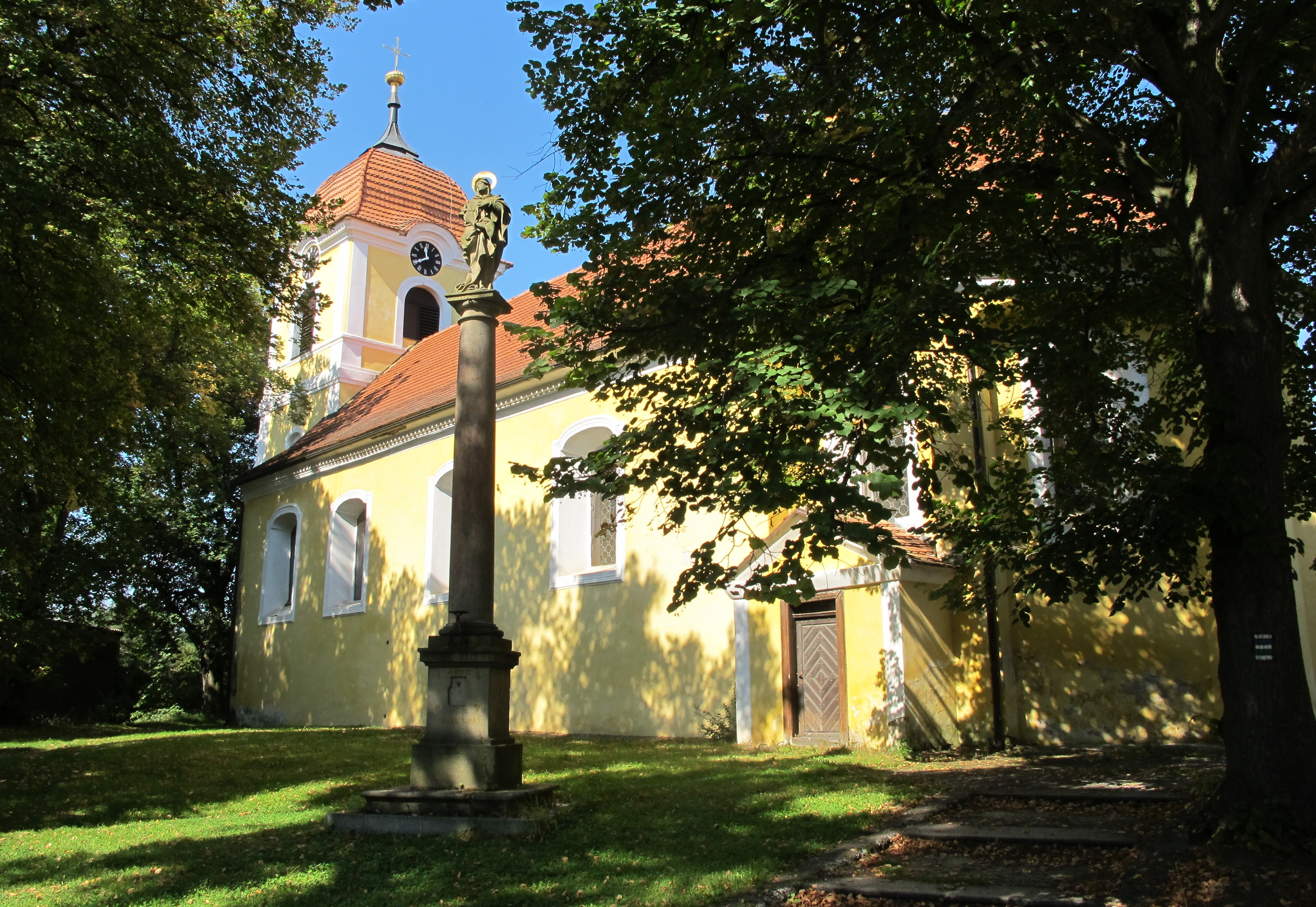
- Church of Saint Andrew

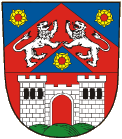
- Coat of arms

- Location in the Czech Republic
- Coordinates: 49°51′12″N 13°58′53″E
- Country: Czech Republic
- Region: Central Bohemian
- District: Beroun
- First mentioned: 1318

Area
  - Total: 13.24 km^{2} (5.11 sq mi)
- Elevation: 308 m (1,010 ft)

Population (2026-01-01)
  - Total: 1,376
  - Density: 103.9/km^{2} (269.2/sq mi)
- Time zone: UTC+1 (CET)
  - Summer (DST): UTC+2 (CEST)
- Postal codes: 267 23, 267 51
- Website: obec-lochovice.cz

Lochovice is a municipality and village in Beroun District in the Central Bohemian Region of the Czech Republic. It has about 1,400 inhabitants.

== Administrative division ==
Lochovice consists of four municipal parts (in brackets population according to the 2021 census):

- Lochovice (1,109)
- Kočvary (15)
- Netolice (95)
- Obora (161)

== Etymology ==
The name is derived from the personal name Loch, meaning "the village of Loch's people".

== Geography ==
Lochovice is located about 13 kilometres (8 mi) south of Beroun and 34 km (21 mi) southwest of Prague. It lies mostly in the Hořovice Uplands, only the southern tip of the municipal territory extends into the Brdy Highlands. The highest point is at 452 m (1,483 ft) above sea level. The Litavka River flows through the municipality.

== History ==
The first written mention of Lochovice is from 1318. For most of its history, it was owned by various lesser noble families. In 1574, Lochovice was promoted to a market town by Emperor Maximilian II, but it later lost the title.

== Demographics ==
Historical population

Year	Pop.	±%
1869	1,637	—
1880	1,739	+6.2%
1890	1,869	+7.5%
1900	1,828	−2.2%
1910	1,759	−3.8%

Year	Pop.	±%
1921	1,760	+0.1%
1930	1,754	−0.3%
1950	1,408	−19.7%
1961	1,633	+16.0%
1970	1,460	−10.6%

Year	Pop.	±%
1980	1,328	−9.0%
1991	1,137	−14.4%
2001	1,047	−7.9%
2011	1,136	+8.5%
2021	1,380	+21.5%

Source: Censuses

== Transport ==
Lochovice is located on the railway lines Prague–České Budějovice and Beroun–Strakonice.

== Sights ==
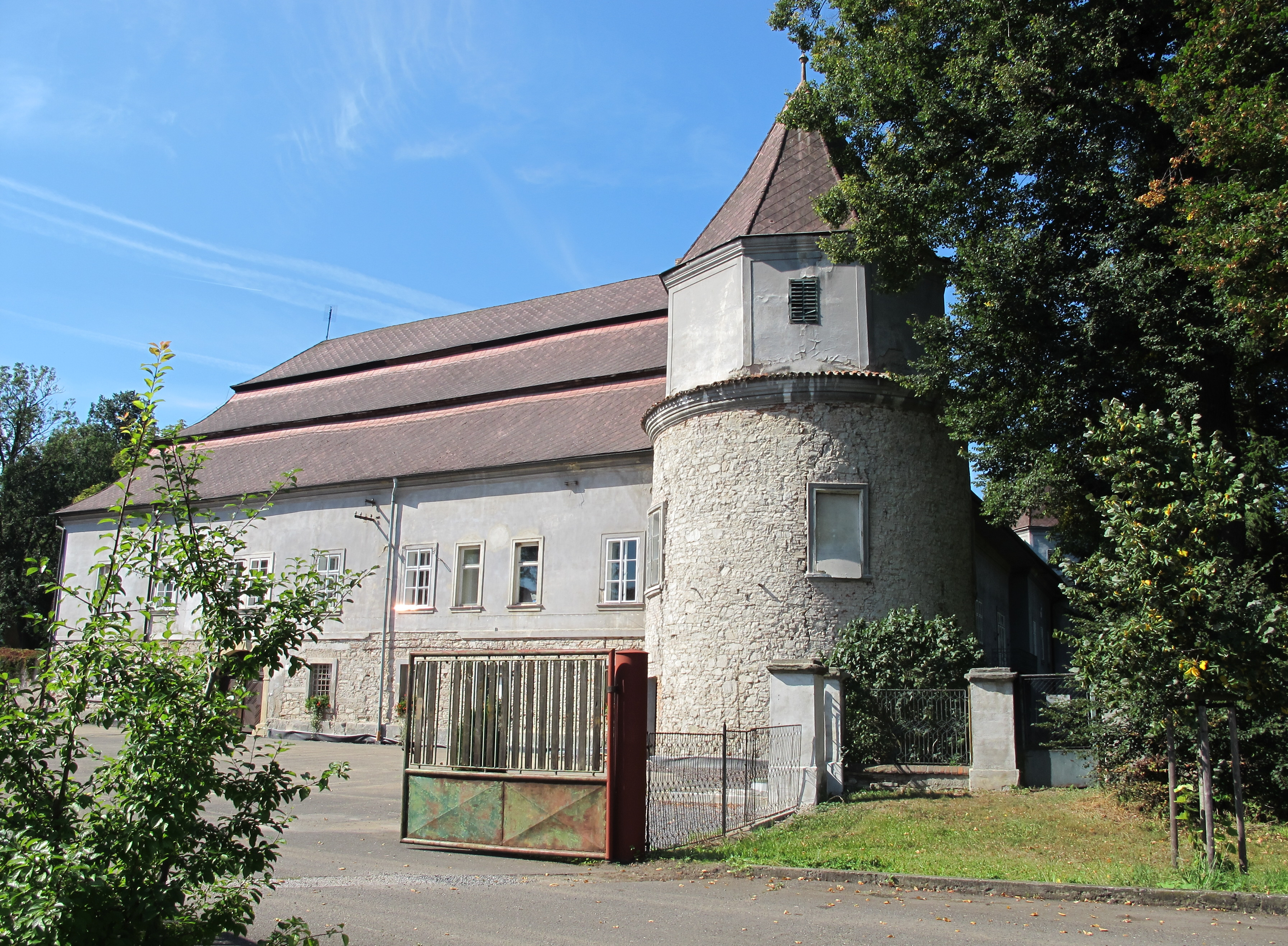
Lochovice Castle

The main landmark of Lochovice is the Church of Saint Andrew. It was built in the early Baroque style in 1654, on the site of a Gothic church dedicated to Saint Stanislaus, which was destroyed during the Thirty Years' War.

The Lochovice Castle was built in the late Renaissance style in the last quarter of the 16th century. After 1754, it was rebuilt in the Baroque style. Today it is privately owned and inaccessible to the public.

== Notable people ==
- Martin Horký (1578–1670s), astronomer
- Josef Fiala (1748–1816), composer and multi-instrumentalist
- Václav Hrabě (1940–1965), poet; grew up here and is buried here
