= Litavka =

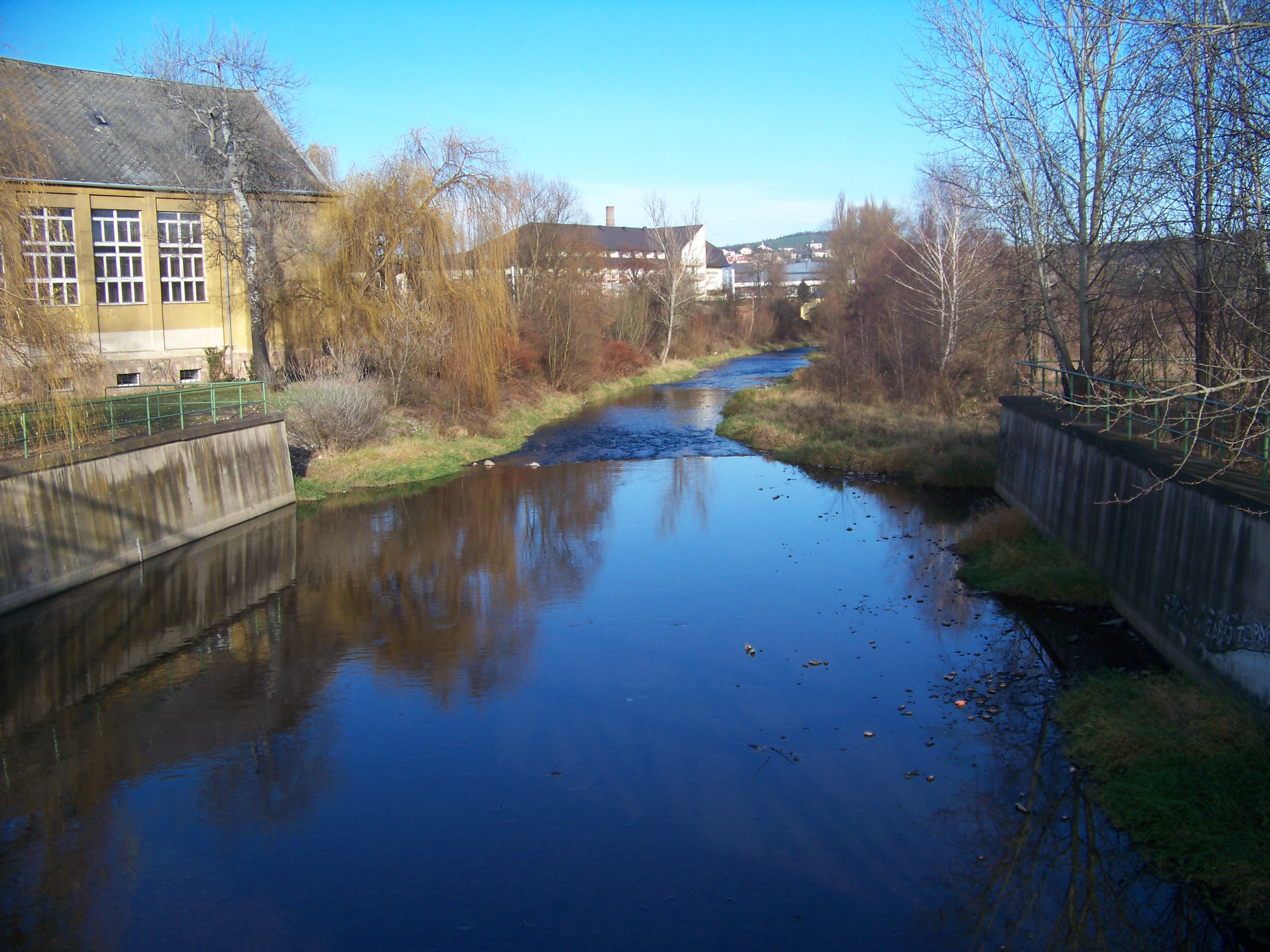
- The Litavka in Beroun

Location
- Country: Czech Republic
- Region: Central Bohemian

Physical characteristics
- Source
  - location: Vranovice, Brdy Highlands
  - coordinates: 49°39′24″N 13°51′25″E
  - elevation: 762 m (2,500 ft)
- Mouth
  - location: Berounka
  - coordinates: 49°57′37″N 14°5′4″E
  - elevation: 212 m (696 ft)
- Length: 54.9 km (34.1 mi)
- Basin size: 628.8 km^{2} (242.8 sq mi)
- Discharge
  - average: 2.6 m^{3}/s (92 cu ft/s) near estuary

Basin features
- Progression: Berounka→ Vltava→ Elbe→ North Sea

The Litavka (Czech pronunciation: [ˈlɪtafka]) is a river in the Czech Republic, a right tributary of the Berounka River. It flows through the Central Bohemian Region. It is 54.9 km (34.1 mi) long.

== Etymology ==
The river was originally called Pstruhový potok (meaning 'trout stream') and Bohutínský potok ('Bohutín stream'). The name Litavka is used from the 18th century. It is derived from the Czech word root lit, from which the verbs lít ('to pour') and rozlévat ('to spill') are derived. It refers to the regular flooding of the stream and its spilling from the banks.

== Characteristic ==
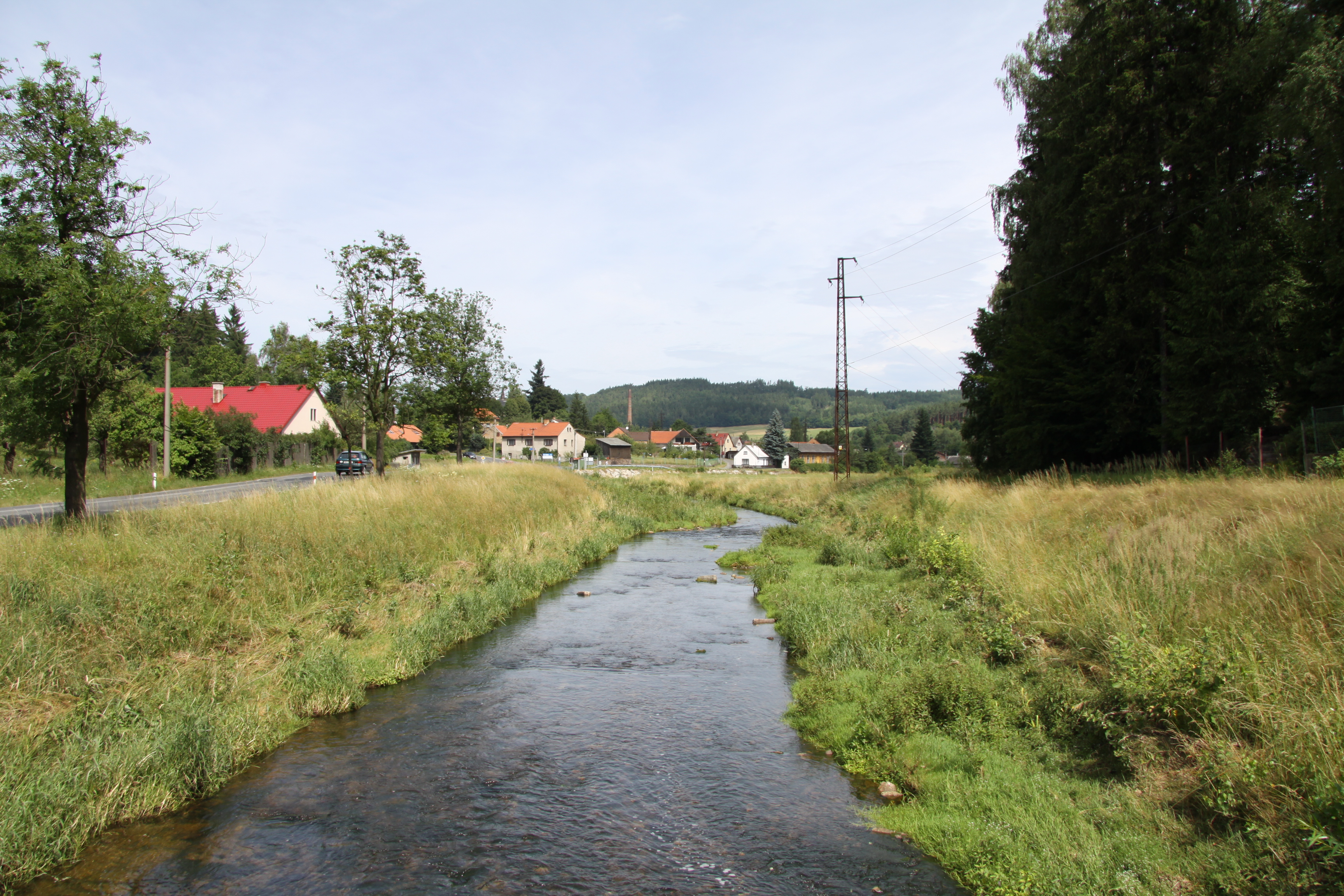
The Litavka in Čenkov

The Litavka originates in the territory of Vranovice in the Brdy Highlands at an elevation of 762 m (2,500 ft), on the slope of the Malý Tok mountain, and flows to Beroun, where it enters the Berounka River at an elevation of 212 m (696 ft). It is 54.9 km (34.1 mi) long. Its drainage basin has an area of 628.8 km^{2} (242.8 sq mi).

The longest tributaries of the Litavka are:

Tributary	Length (km)	River km	Side
Červený potok	29.1	7.3	left
Chumava	17.7	14.4	right
Suchomastský potok	11.3	1.8	right
Příbramský potok	11.3	37.7	right
Dibeřský potok	9.7	2.3	left

== Course ==
The most notable settlement on the river is the town of Příbram. The river flows through the municipal territories of Vranovice, Láz, Bohutín, Příbram, Trhové Dušníky, Bratkovice, Hluboš, Čenkov, Jince, Lochovice, Libomyšl, Chodouň, Zdice, Králův Dvůr and Beroun.

== Bodies of water ==
There are 538 bodies of water in the basin area. The largest of them is the Pilská Reservoir with an area of 20.5 ha (51 acres), built on the stream of Pilský potok. Directly on the Litavka there are the Láz Reservoir and Vysokopecký Pond.

== Fauna ==
The river is inhabited by river trout, common roach, common chub and stone loach. Unwanted species of fish escape occasionally into the river from the breeding tanks.

== See also ==
- List of rivers of the Czech Republic
- Na Litavce, football stadium in Příbram named after the river
