= Hluboš =

- Municipality
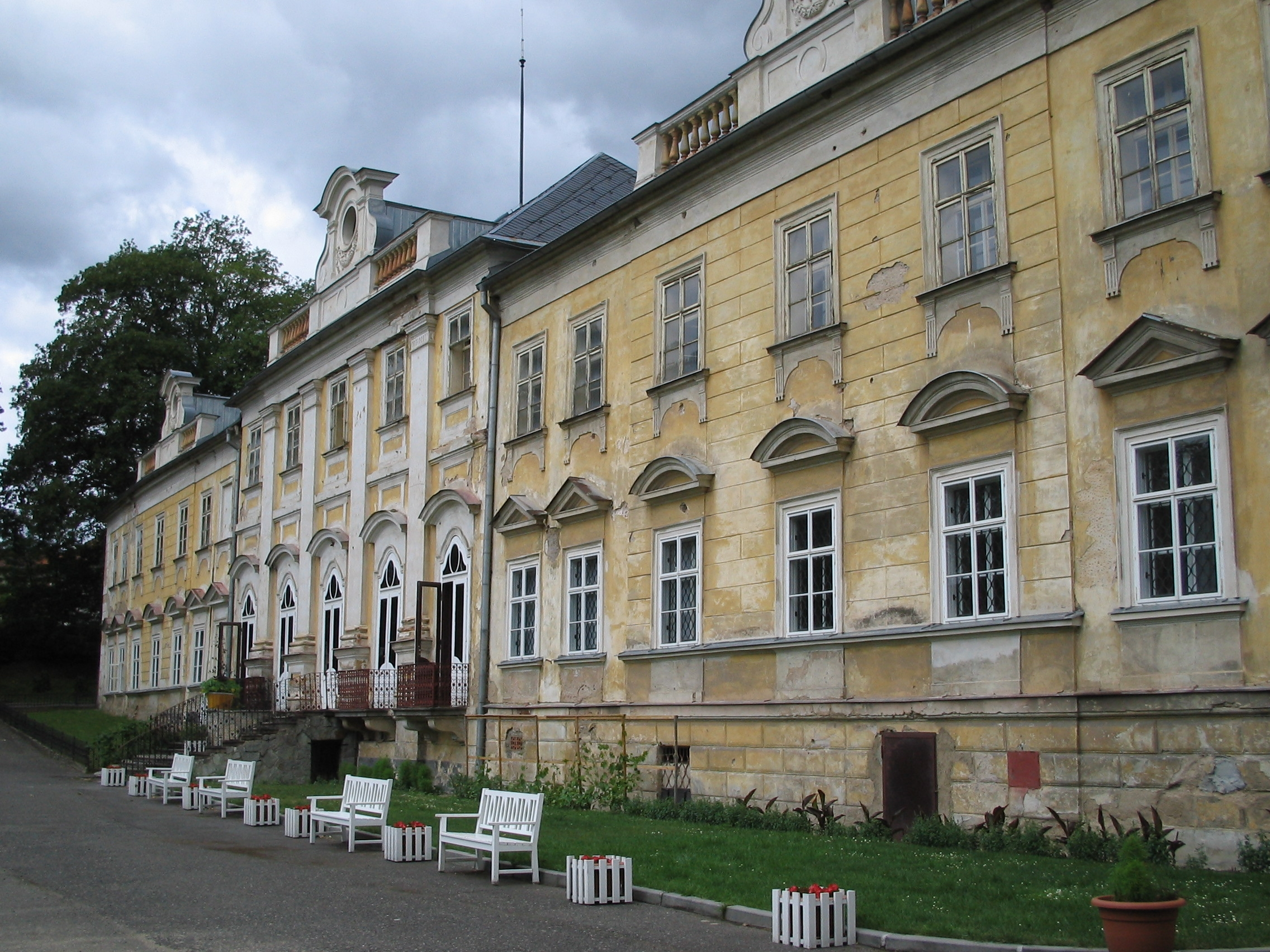
- Hluboš Castle

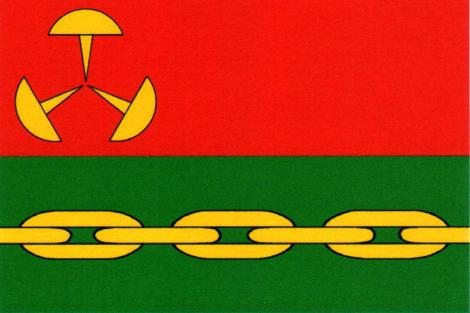
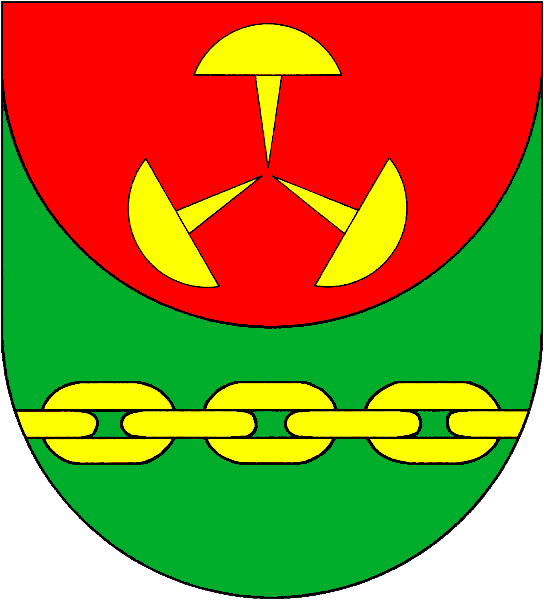
- Flag Coat of arms

- Location in the Czech Republic
- Coordinates: 49°44′47″N 14°1′13″E
- Country: Czech Republic
- Region: Central Bohemian
- District: Příbram
- First mentioned: 1355

Area
  - Total: 12.07 km^{2} (4.66 sq mi)
- Elevation: 475 m (1,558 ft)

Population (2026-01-01)
  - Total: 692
  - Density: 57.3/km^{2} (148/sq mi)
- Time zone: UTC+1 (CET)
  - Summer (DST): UTC+2 (CEST)
- Postal code: 262 22
- Website: www.hlubos.eu

Hluboš is a municipality and village in Příbram District in the Central Bohemian Region of the Czech Republic. It has about 700 inhabitants.

== Administrative division ==
Hluboš consists of two municipal parts (in brackets population according to the 2021 census):

- Hluboš (516)
- Kardavec (133)

== Etymology ==
The name is derived from the surname Hluboš.

== Geography ==
Hluboš is located about 7 kilometres (4 mi) north of Příbram and 41 km (25 mi) southwest of Prague. It lies in the Brdy Highlands. The highest point is the hill Malý Chlum at 591 m (1,939 ft) above sea level. The municipality is situated on the right bank of the Litavka River.

== History ==
The first written mention of Hluboš is from 1355. A wooden fortress was located here. The owners of Hluboš often changed and belonged to the lower nobility. In 1546, Petr Vamberský had rebuilt the fortress into a castle.

== Demographics ==
Historical population

Year	Pop.	±%
1869	1,082	—
1880	903	−16.5%
1890	851	−5.8%
1900	900	+5.8%
1910	930	+3.3%

Year	Pop.	±%
1921	926	−0.4%
1930	854	−7.8%
1950	726	−15.0%
1961	656	−9.6%
1970	641	−2.3%

Year	Pop.	±%
1980	561	−12.5%
1991	533	−5.0%
2001	512	−3.9%
2011	558	+9.0%
2021	649	+16.3%

Source: Censuses

== Transport ==
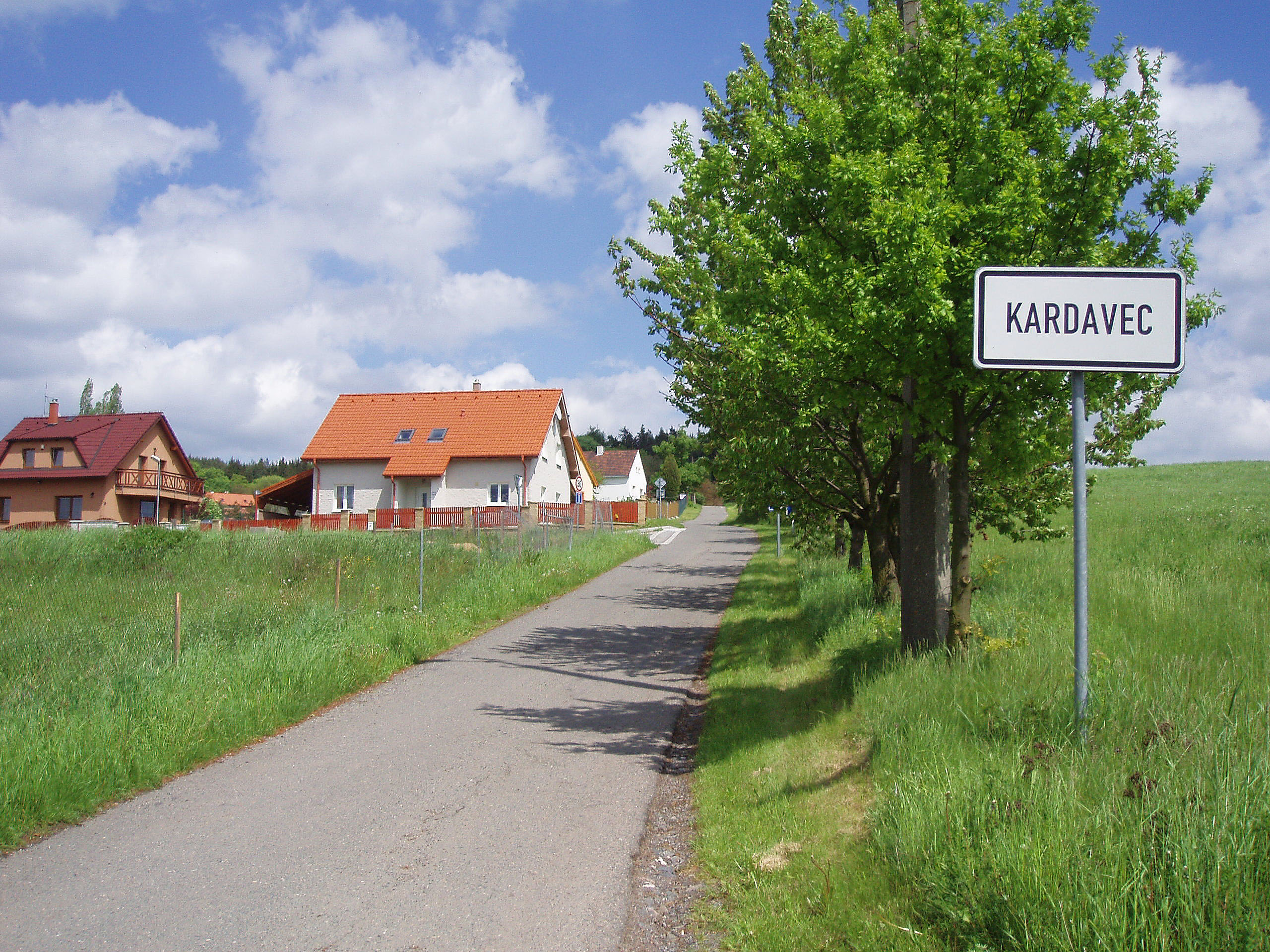
The village of Kardavec

There are no railways or major roads passing through the municipality.

== Sights ==
The Hluboš Castle was rebuilt into the late Baroque form in the 18th century. In 1872, it was reconstructed and extended by the Oettingen-Wallerstein family. The result of these modifications is the present appearance of the castle with many pseudo-Renaissance elements. In 1920 and 1921, it served as a summer residence of Czechoslovak president Tomáš Garrigue Masaryk.

The botanical garden at Hluboš Castle is one of the oldest in Central Europe. Through the Hluboš park, some trees from America and China appeared in the Czech Republic for the very first time. These were, for example, Ginkgo biloba, Cedrus libani, Juniperus virginiana, Tsuga canadensis, Thuja and Taxus.

Today the castle complex is privately owned and partially open to the public under certain conditions.
