= Paulo Rodrigues =

Paulo Rodrigues is the name of:

- Paulo César Rodrigues Lima (born 1981), Brazilian footballer
- Paulo Rodrigues Barcelos (born 1960), Brazilian footballer
- Paulo Rodrigues da Silva (1986–2012), Brazilian footballer
- Paulo Rodrigues (athlete)

== See also ==
- Paul Rodriguez (disambiguation)
- Paulo Rodriguez (disambiguation)
