= Kotenčice =

- Municipality
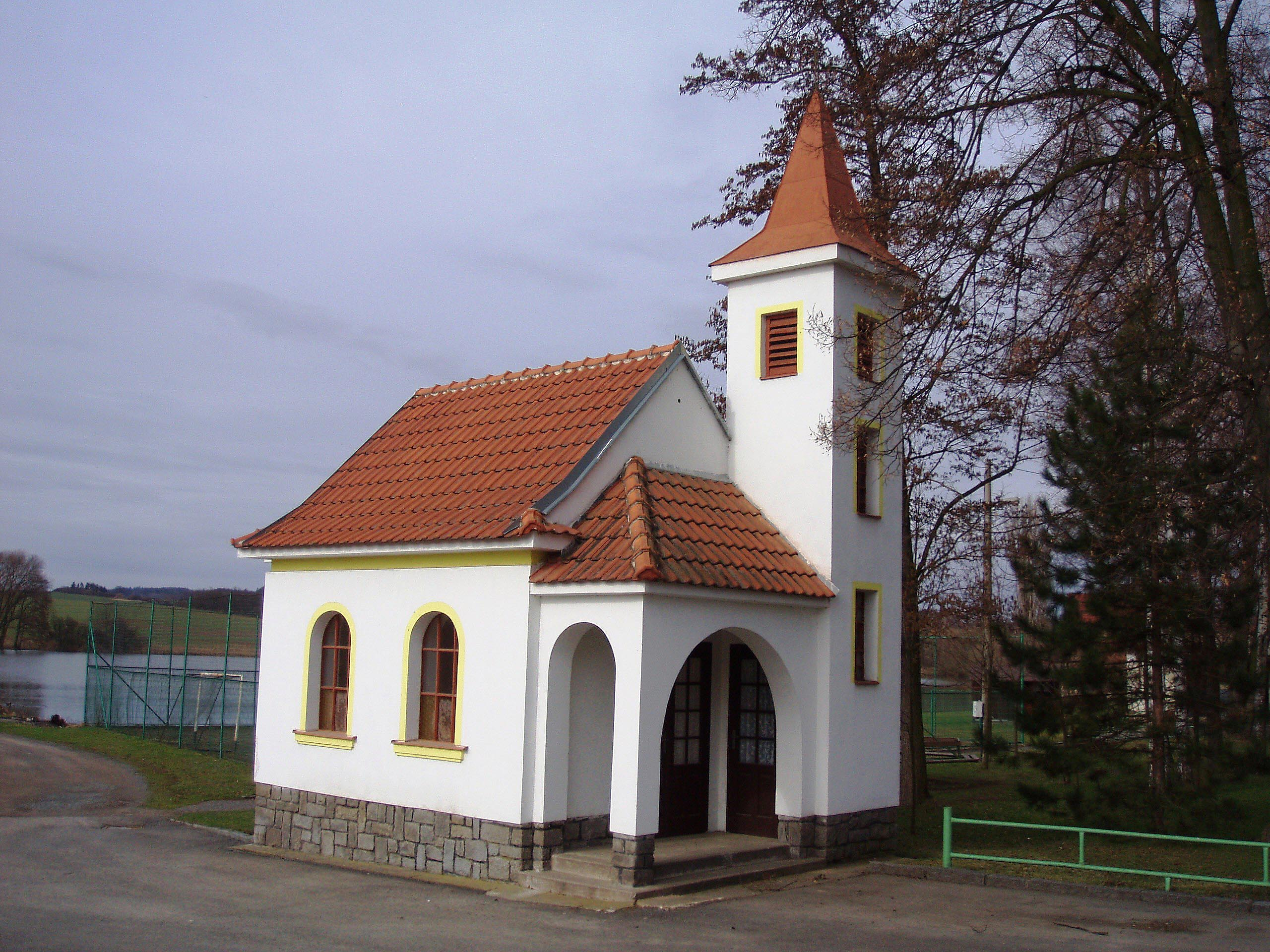
- Chapel in Kotenčice

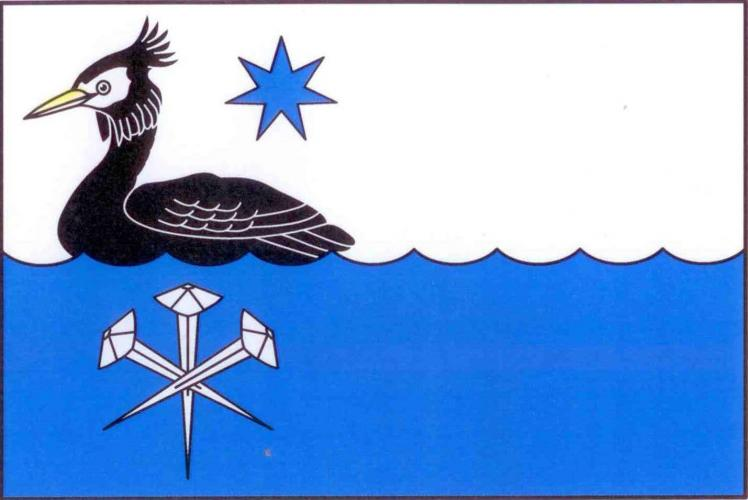
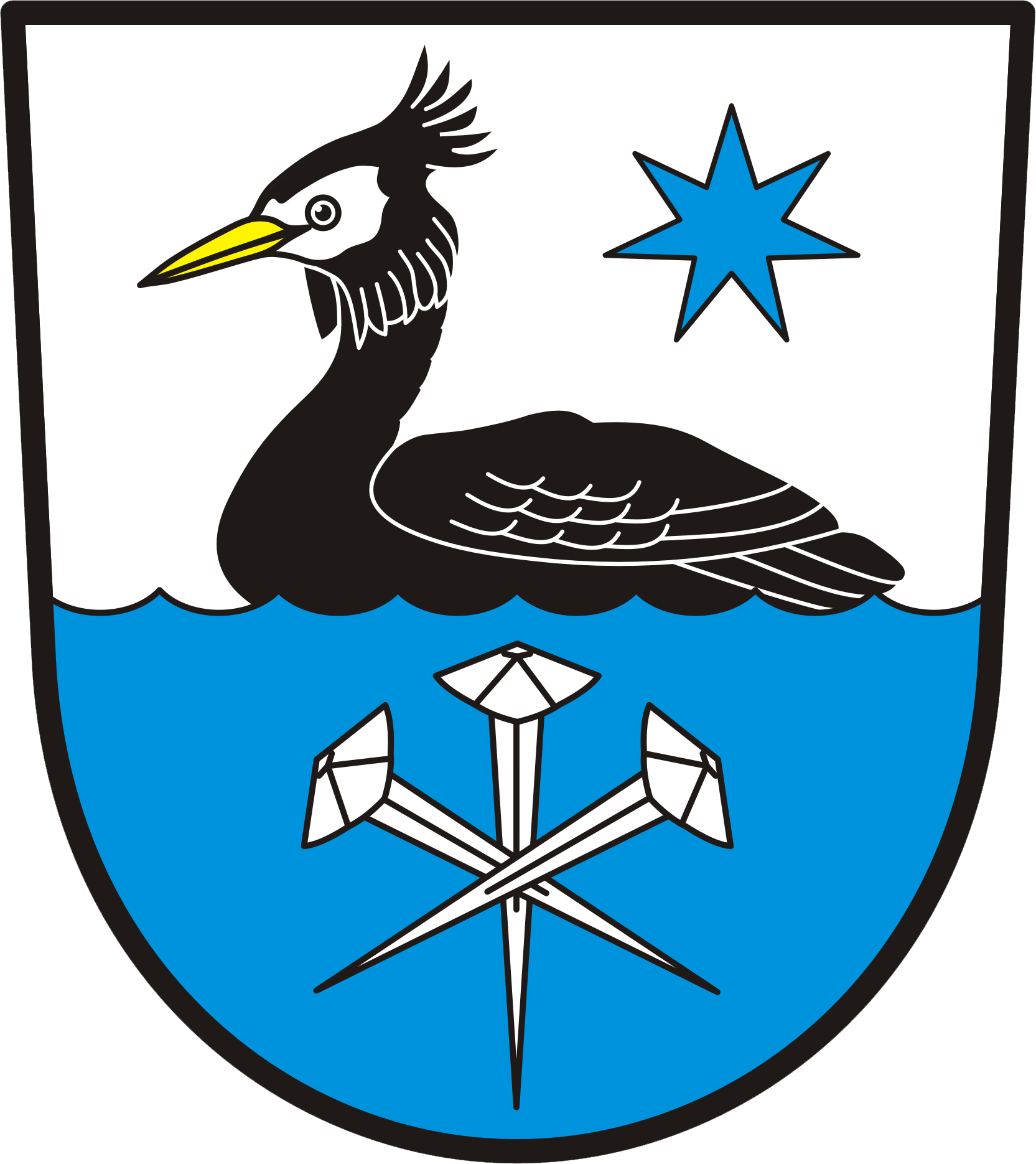
- Flag Coat of arms

- Location in the Czech Republic
- Coordinates: 49°44′11″N 14°5′38″E
- Country: Czech Republic
- Region: Central Bohemian
- District: Příbram
- First mentioned: 1382

Area
  - Total: 2.34 km^{2} (0.90 sq mi)
- Elevation: 417 m (1,368 ft)

Population (2026-01-01)
  - Total: 216
  - Density: 92.3/km^{2} (239/sq mi)
- Time zone: UTC+1 (CET)
  - Summer (DST): UTC+2 (CEST)
- Postal code: 262 23
- Website: www.kotencice.cz

Kotenčice is a municipality and village in Příbram District in the Central Bohemian Region of the Czech Republic. It has about 200 inhabitants.

== Etymology ==
The name is derived from the personal name Kotenec, meaning "the village of Kotenec's people".

== Geography ==
Kotenčice is located about 8 kilometres (5 mi) northeast of Příbram and 40 km (25 mi) southwest of Prague. It lies mostly in the Brdy Highlands, only the easternmost part of the municipal territory extends into the Benešov Uplands. The highest point is at 452 m (1,483 ft) above sea level. The stream Kotenčický potok flows through the municipality. The village is surrounded by three fishponds.

== History ==
The first written mention of Kotenčice is from 1382.

== Demographics ==
Historical population

Year	Pop.	±%
1869	273	—
1880	286	+4.8%
1890	288	+0.7%
1900	288	+0.0%
1910	275	−4.5%

Year	Pop.	±%
1921	284	+3.3%
1930	234	−17.6%
1950	187	−20.1%
1961	184	−1.6%
1970	189	+2.7%

Year	Pop.	±%
1980	190	+0.5%
1991	181	−4.7%
2001	202	+11.6%
2011	195	−3.5%
2021	204	+4.6%

Source: Censuses

== Transport ==
There are no railways or major roads passing through the municipality.

== Sights ==
There are no protected cultural monuments in the municipality. In the centre of the village is a chapel.
