= Mníšek pod Brdy =

- Town
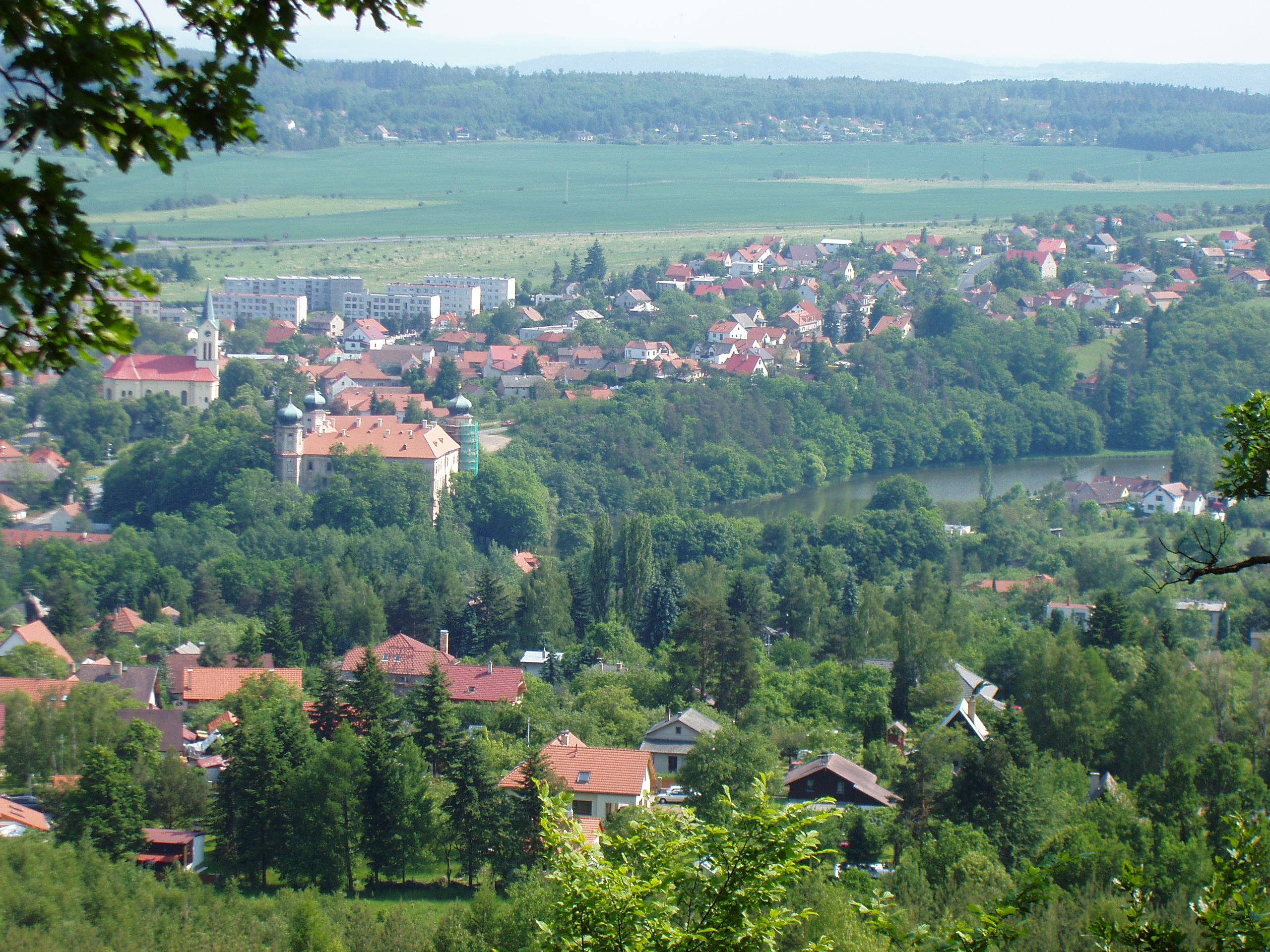
- General view of Mníšek pod Brdy

- Flag Coat of arms

- Location in the Czech Republic
- Coordinates: 49°51′59″N 14°15′42″E
- Country: Czech Republic
- Region: Central Bohemian
- District: Prague-West
- First mentioned: 1348

Government
  - Mayor: Petr Digrin

Area
  - Total: 26.50 km^{2} (10.23 sq mi)
- Elevation: 385 m (1,263 ft)

Population (2026-01-01)
  - Total: 6,377
  - Density: 240.6/km^{2} (623.3/sq mi)
- Time zone: UTC+1 (CET)
  - Summer (DST): UTC+2 (CEST)
- Postal code: 252 10
- Website: www.mnisek.cz

Mníšek pod Brdy (Czech pronunciation: [ˈmɲiːʃɛk ˈpod br̩dɪ]) is a town in Prague-West District in the Central Bohemian Region of the Czech Republic. It has about 6,400 inhabitants. The town proper is located on the stream Bojovský potok in the Benešov Uplands.

The main landmarks of the town are the Mníšek pod Brdy Castle and the Skalka complex of Baroque buildings. The historic town centre and the Skalka area are well preserved and are protected as an urban monument zone.

== Etymology ==
The name Mníšek is a diminutive of mnich, which means 'monk' in Czech. The suffix pod Brdy means 'below Brdy' and refers to the town's location.

== Geography ==
Mníšek pod Brdy is located about 15 kilometres (9 mi) southwest of Prague. It lies mostly in the Benešov Uplands, only the northern part of the municipal territory extends into the Brdy Highlands. The highest point is the Skalka hill at 553 m (1,814 ft) above sea level. The stream Bojovský potok flows through the town and supplies a system of fishponds in the centre of the town. The largest body of water is the fishpond Sýkorník, located east of the built-up area.

== History ==
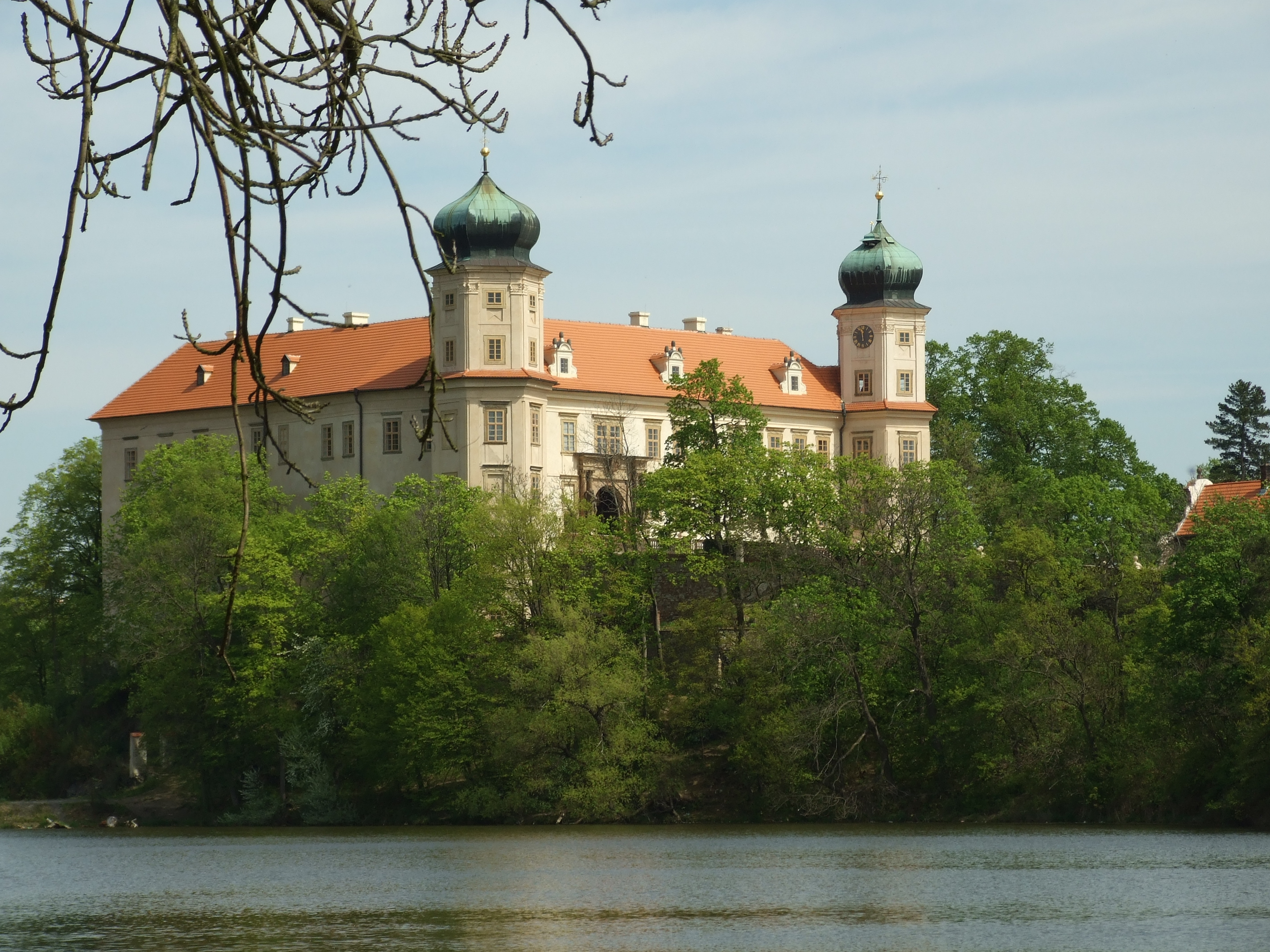
Mníšek pod Brdy Castle

The first written mention of Mníšek pod Brdy is from 1348, when existence of the castle is documented. From 1487 to 1655, the estate was owned by the Lords of Mitrovice. In 1639, during the Thirty Years' War, Mníšek pod Brdy was damaged and looted by the Swedish army led by Johan Banér. In 1655, the estate was bought by Servác Engel of Engelsfluss, a burgher from Prague. He had repaired the castle. Among the following owners of the estate were the families of Unvert and Pachta of Rájov.

== Demographics ==
Historical population

Year	Pop.	±%
1869	1,799	—
1880	1,853	+3.0%
1890	1,790	−3.4%
1900	1,640	−8.4%
1910	1,590	−3.0%

Year	Pop.	±%
1921	1,520	−4.4%
1930	1,640	+7.9%
1950	1,861	+13.5%
1961	3,381	+81.7%
1970	3,712	+9.8%

Year	Pop.	±%
1980	3,892	+4.8%
1991	3,957	+1.7%
2001	4,082	+3.2%
2011	4,632	+13.5%
2021	6,351	+37.1%

Source: Censuses

== Transport ==
The D4 motorway from Prague to Písek runs through the territory of Mníšek pod Brdy.

Mníšek pod Brdy is located on the railway line Prague–Dobříš. The town is served by two train station: Mníšek pod Brdy and Rymaně.

== Sights ==
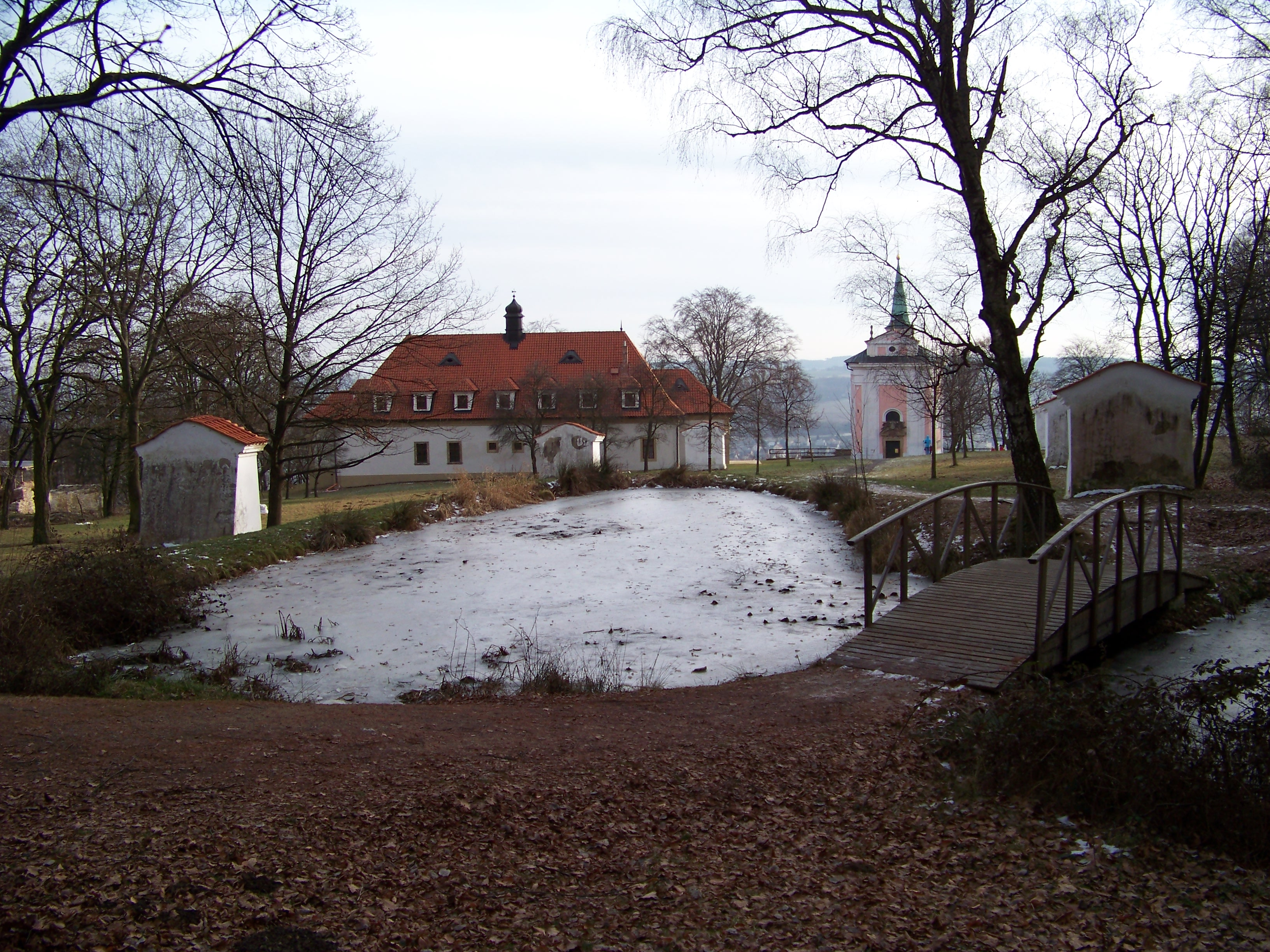
Baroque complex of Skalka

Mníšek pod Brdy Castle is the main landmark of the town and its oldest building. It includes a fishpond and a small castle park. Today the castle is owned by the state and offers guided tours.

The main landmark of the town square is the Church of Saint Wenceslaus. It was built in 1743–1756 by an unknown architect on the place of a church which was burned down by the Swedish army in 1639.

The Baroque complex of Skalka is located on the hill Skalka. It was built by Servác Engel of Engelsfluss in the 17th century. It includes the Chapel of Saint Mary Magdalene, a monastery, the Stations of the Cross and a hermitage.
