= Beaver-engineered dam in the Czech Republic =

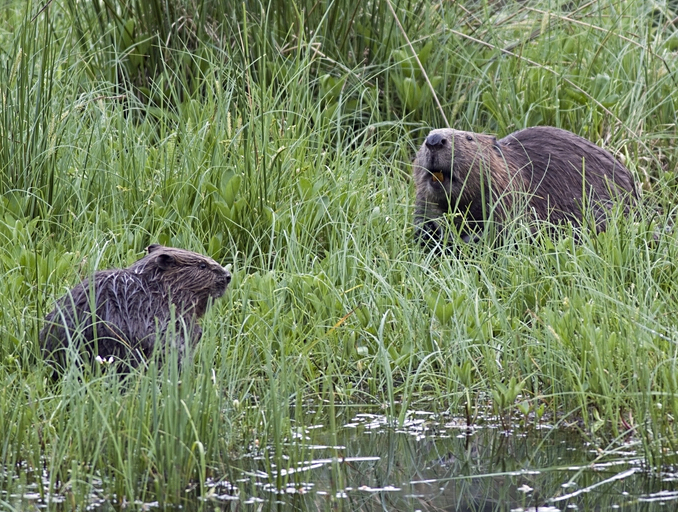
A Eurasian beaver with her kit along the River Tay

In early 2025, beaver activity in the Brdy Protected Landscape Area, Czech Republic, contributed to the restoration of a wetland ecosystem. A family of beavers constructed a series of dams that accomplished environmental goals set by the Czech government, which had delayed its proposed project since 2018 for bureaucratic and financial reasons. The beaver-built dams saved the Czech government approximately US$1.2 million, providing ecological benefits including improved water quality, enhanced biodiversity, and better water retention.

== Background ==
The Brdy region, located south of Prague, had been affected by artificial drainage systems established by the Brdy Military District, leading to environmental degradation. Decades earlier, soldiers had excavated bypass gullies to drain water from the land, transforming the wetland into a dry terrain. In 2016, the Brdy Protected Landscape Area was established in place of the abolished military district and some surrounding areas. Recognizing the ecological damage, the administration of the Brdy protected landscape area drafted plans in 2018 to construct small dams to restore the wetland and protect the Klabava river from sedimentation and acidic water pollution originating from nearby ponds. However, bureaucratic obstacles, unresolved land ownership disputes, and financial constraints led to significant delays in implementing the project.

== Beaver construction ==
External image
- Image of the natural dam created by beavers in Brdy photographed for the Nature Conservation Agency of the Czech Republic

In early 2025, a family of Eurasian beavers (Castor fiber) naturally built a series of dams in the same locations where the human-planned infrastructure was intended. The beavers used wood, mud, and stones to create structures that slowed water drainage and restored the wetland environment. This spontaneous restoration effort resulted in a thriving ecosystem, benefiting local wildlife such as rare stone crayfish, frogs, aquatic insects, and bird species dependent on wetland habitats.

Experts noted that beavers are instinctive engineers capable of altering landscapes to support water retention and biodiversity. Their activities help regulate water flow, mitigate soil erosion, and improve water filtration, making them vital contributors to wetland health. The beaver-made dams in Brdy not only recreated a functioning wetland but also provided long-term benefits by reducing flood risks, preventing drought effects, and maintaining a balanced ecosystem.

== Reaction and recognition ==
Czech conservation authorities praised the beavers for their unexpected yet effective environmental work. Bohumil Fišer, head of the Brdy Protected Landscape Area, stated that the beavers "built the dams without any project documentation and for free", and achieved the desired ecological outcomes "practically overnight". The estimated cost savings for the Czech government amounted to 30 million Czech koruna (US$1.2 million), as the project was completed without human labor or funding.

Zoologists and environmentalists emphasized the broader significance of the event, reinforcing the role of beavers as "ecosystem engineers". This case contributed to growing discussions in Europe about the benefits of beaver rewilding programs, particularly in regions where their activity supports flood management, water conservation, and habitat restoration.

The Brdy beaver colony is part of a larger resurgence of Eurasian beaver populations in the Czech Republic, with estimates indicating around 15,000 individuals across the country. While beavers can sometimes create conflicts by felling trees or flooding agricultural lands, officials noted that the Brdy site is located far from farmland, making long-term coexistence with the beavers feasible. Authorities anticipate no significant conflicts with the beaver colony for at least the next decade.
