= Chodouň =

- Municipality
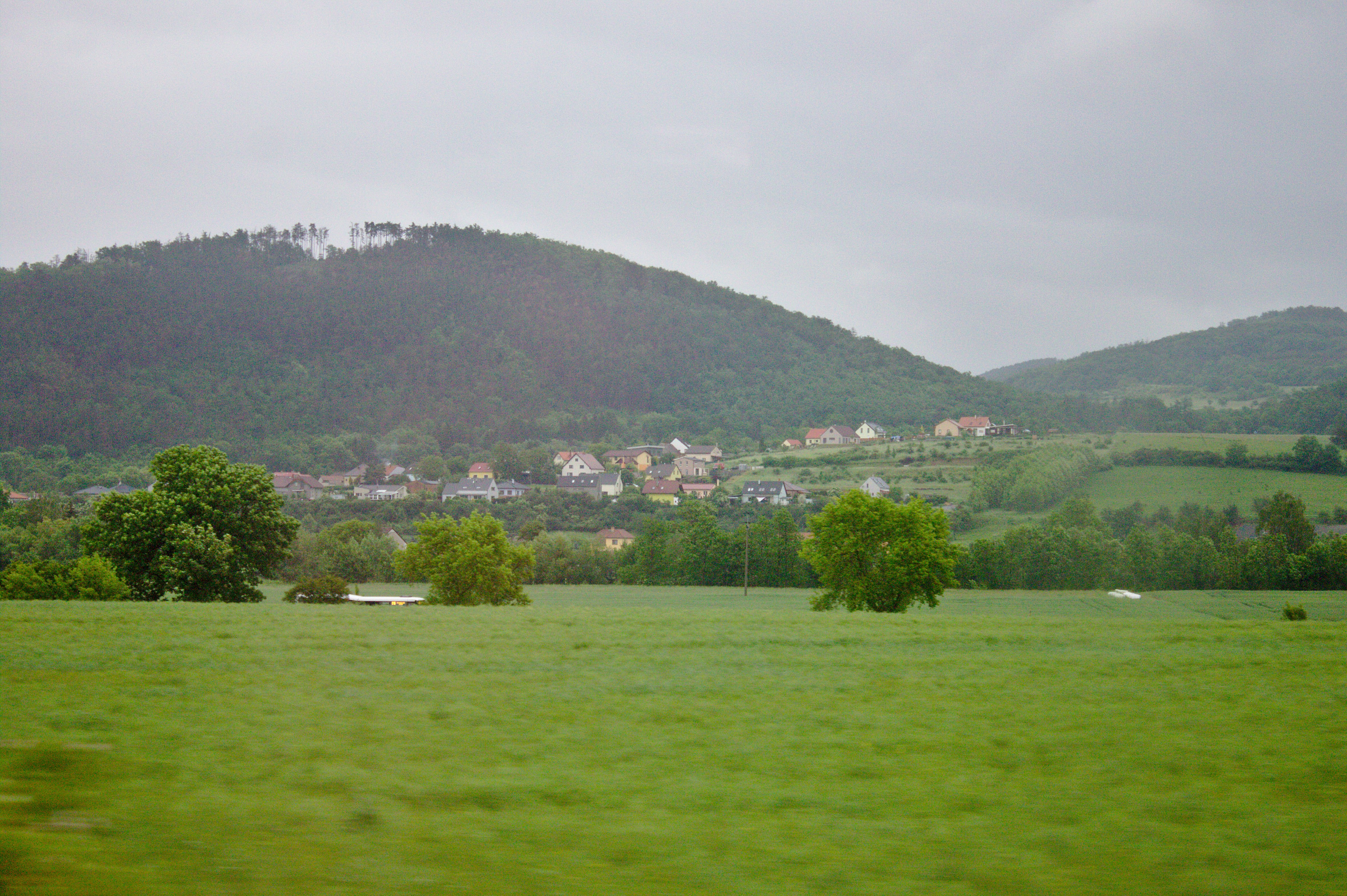
- General view

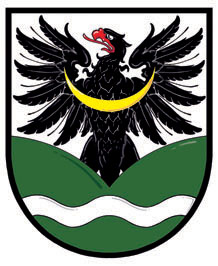
- Flag Coat of arms

- Location in the Czech Republic
- Coordinates: 49°53′54″N 13°59′12″E
- Country: Czech Republic
- Region: Central Bohemian
- District: Beroun
- First mentioned: 1271

Area
  - Total: 4.25 km^{2} (1.64 sq mi)
- Elevation: 269 m (883 ft)

Population (2026-01-01)
  - Total: 720
  - Density: 170/km^{2} (440/sq mi)
- Time zone: UTC+1 (CET)
  - Summer (DST): UTC+2 (CEST)
- Postal code: 267 51
- Website: www.chodoun.cz

Chodouň is a municipality and village in Beroun District in the Central Bohemian Region of the Czech Republic. It has about 700 inhabitants. It lies on the Litavka River.

== Demographics ==
Historical population
Year	Pop.	±%
1869	559	—
1880	572	+2.3%
1890	606	+5.9%
1900	723	+19.3%
1910	837	+15.8%
1921	859	+2.6%
1930	829	−3.5%
1950	683	−17.6%
1961	629	−7.9%
1970	559	−11.1%
1980	511	−8.6%
1991	462	−9.6%
2001	503	+8.9%
2011	607	+20.7%
2021	693	+14.2%
Source: Censuses
