= Paulo Rodriguez =

Paulo Rodriguez may refer to:

- Paulo Rodriguez, contestant on the 2004 Manhunt television gameshow
- Paulo Rodriguez, footballer with the Chilean club Club de Deportes Cobreloa

== See also ==
- Paul Rodriguez (disambiguation)
- Paulo Rodrigues (disambiguation)
