= Bohutín (Příbram District) =

- Municipality
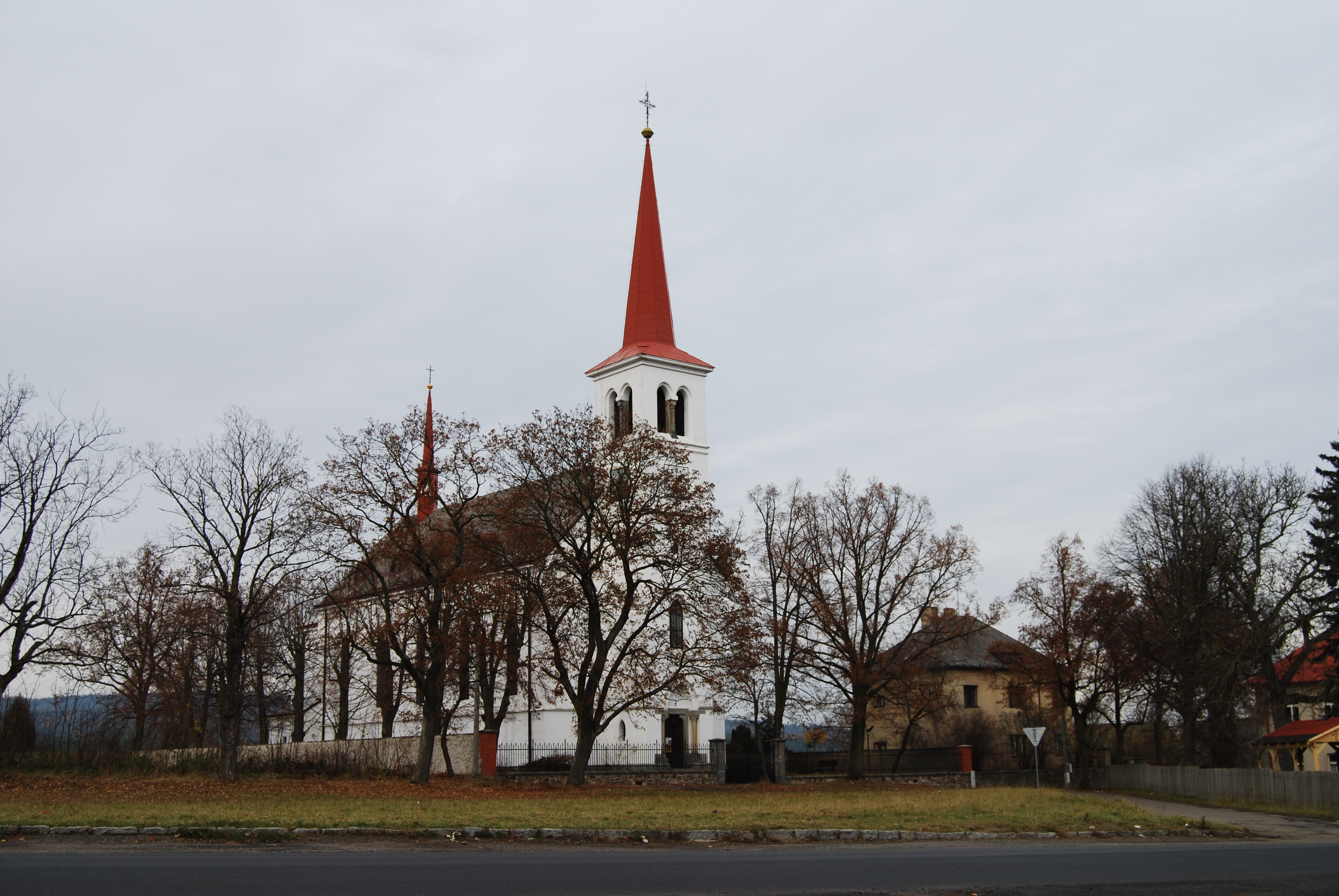
- Church of Saint Mary Magdalene

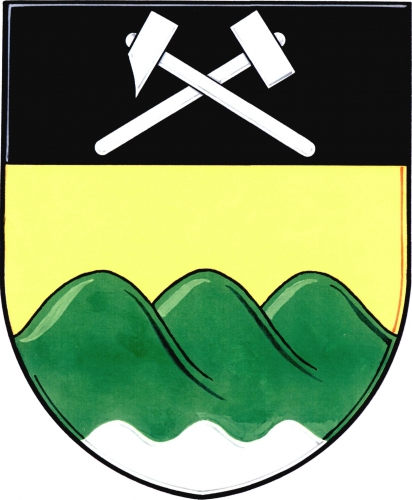
- Flag Coat of arms

- Location in the Czech Republic
- Coordinates: 49°39′20″N 13°56′38″E
- Country: Czech Republic
- Region: Central Bohemian
- District: Příbram
- First mentioned: 1379

Area
  - Total: 8.43 km^{2} (3.25 sq mi)
- Elevation: 553 m (1,814 ft)

Population (2026-01-01)
  - Total: 2,030
  - Density: 241/km^{2} (624/sq mi)
- Time zone: UTC+1 (CET)
  - Summer (DST): UTC+2 (CEST)
- Postal code: 262 41
- Website: www.obec-bohutin.cz

Bohutín is a municipality and village in Příbram District in the Central Bohemian Region of the Czech Republic. It has about 2,000 inhabitants.

== Administrative division ==
Bohutín consists of four municipal parts (in brackets population according to the 2021 census):

- Bohutín (558)
- Havírna (155)
- Tisová (139)
- Vysoká Pec (890)

== Etymology ==
The name is derived from the personal Bohuta, meaning "Bohuta's (court)".

== Geography ==
Bohutín is located about 4 kilometres (2 mi) southwest of Příbram and 52 km (32 mi) southwest of Prague. It lies in the Brdy Highlands. The highest point is the hill Leč at 628 m (2,060 ft). The Litavka River flows through the municipality. There are two notable fishponds: Vysokopecký rybník and Vokačovský rybník.

== History ==
The first written mention of Bohutín is from 1379. Historically, it is a mining settlement associated with the mining of lead and silver ore.

== Demographics ==
Historical population

Year	Pop.	±%
1869	1,610	—
1880	1,835	+14.0%
1890	2,061	+12.3%
1900	2,188	+6.2%
1910	1,822	−16.7%

Year	Pop.	±%
1921	1,480	−18.8%
1930	1,339	−9.5%
1950	991	−26.0%
1961	1,399	+41.2%
1970	1,296	−7.4%

Year	Pop.	±%
1980	1,344	+3.7%
1991	1,397	+3.9%
2001	1,487	+6.4%
2011	1,630	+9.6%
2021	1,742	+6.9%

Source: Censuses

== Transport ==
The I/18 road (the section from Příbram to Rožmitál pod Třemšínem) runs through the municipality.

== Sights ==
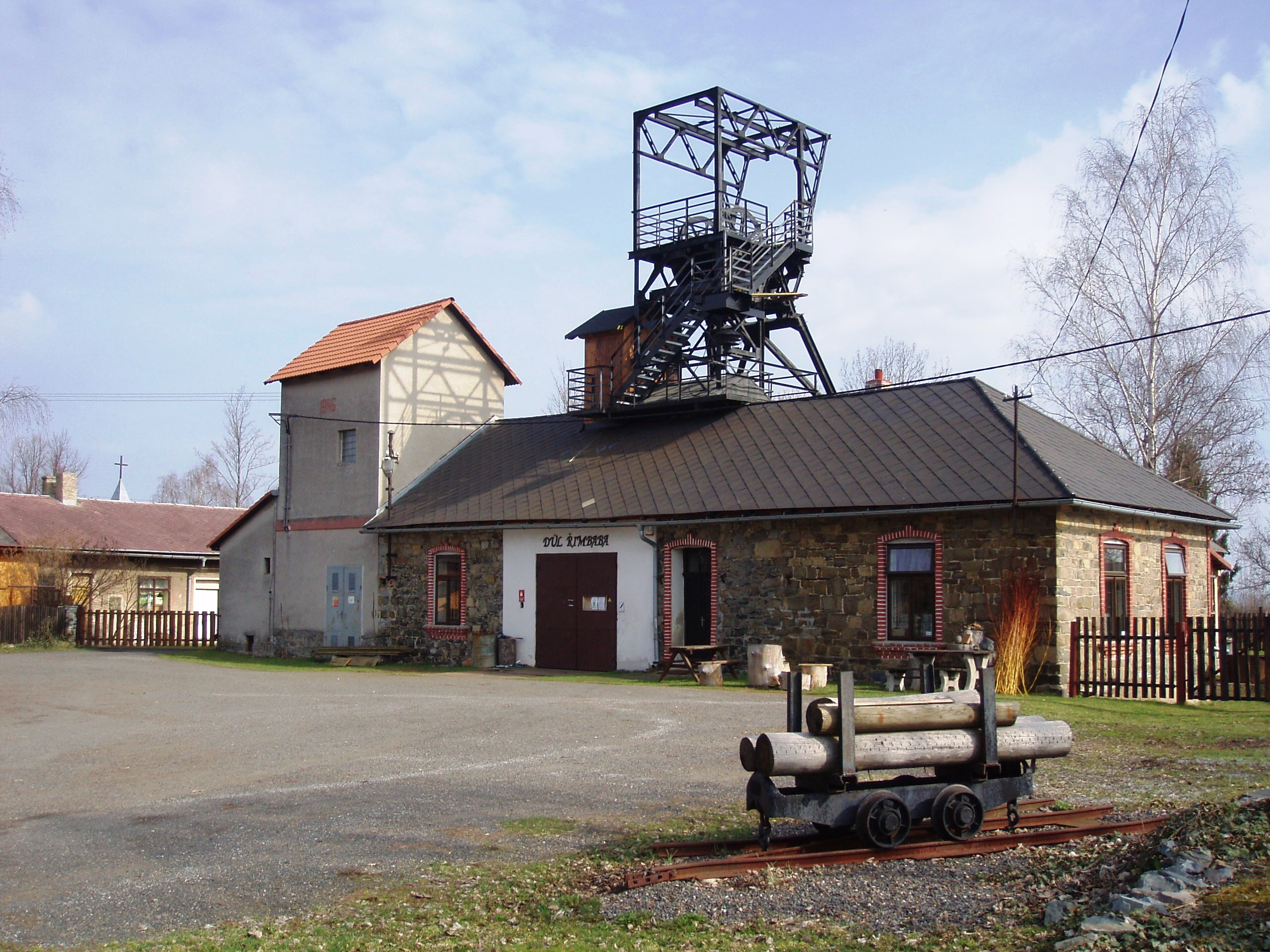
Řimbaba lookout tower

The main landmark of the Bohutín is the Church of the Saint Mary Magdalene. The original church from 1887 was destroyed by a fire in 1950, then it was again built in the pseudo-Gothic style.

In Vysoká Pec is a museum dedicated to Bohutín and its surroundings. Next to the museum is Řimbaba, a former mining tower converted into a lookout tower. The viewing platform of the observation tower is at a height of 14 m (46 ft).
