= Čenkov =

- Municipality
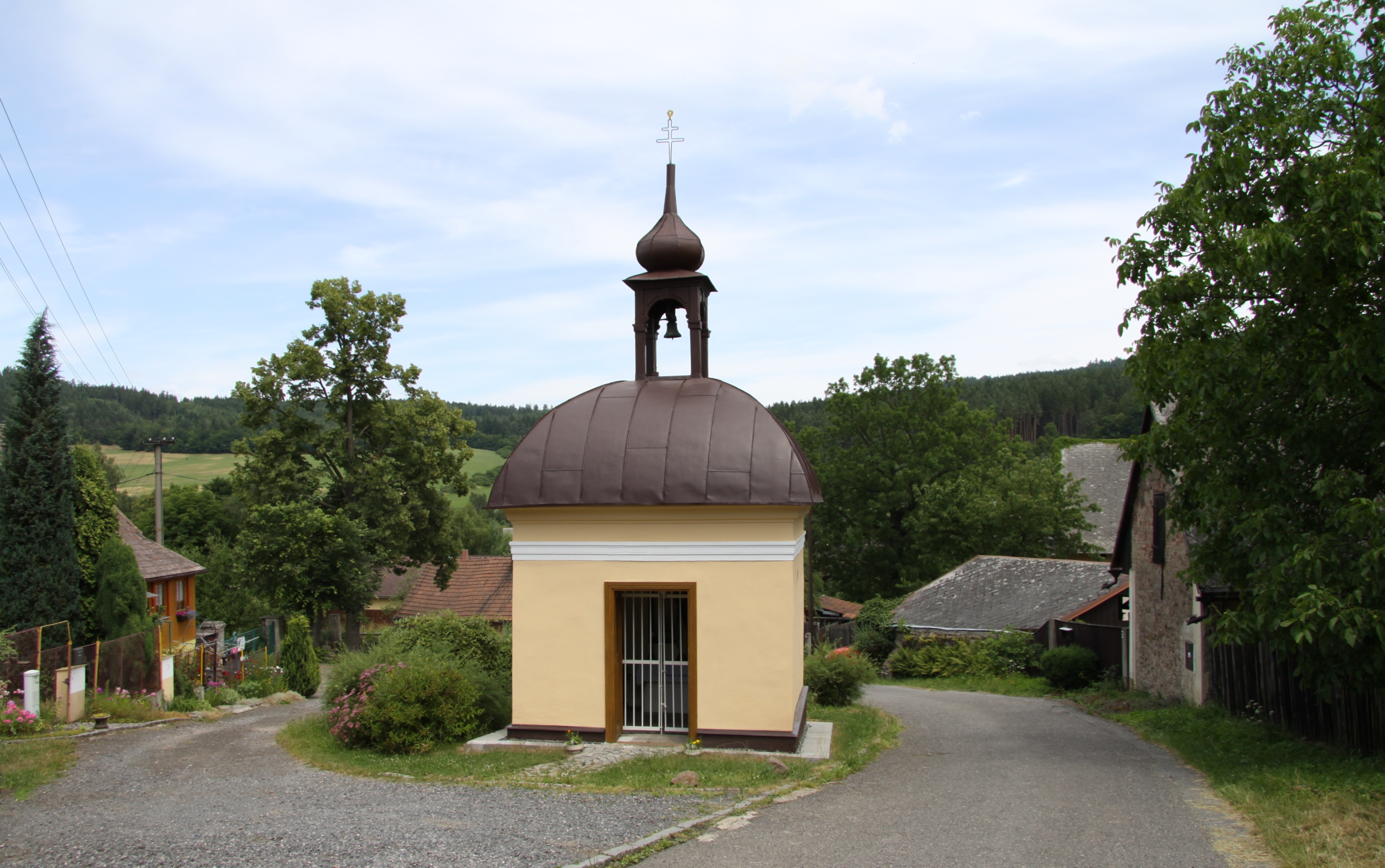
- A chapel in Čenkov

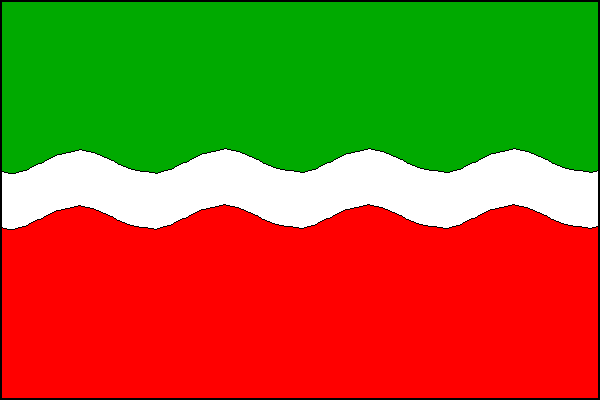
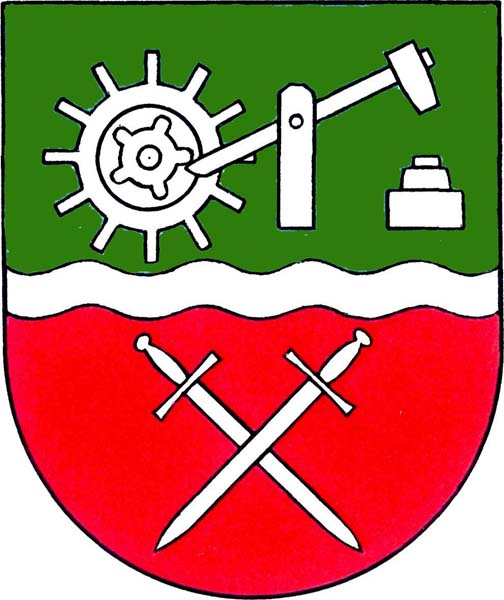
- Flag Coat of arms

- Location in the Czech Republic
- Coordinates: 49°46′40″N 14°0′3″E
- Country: Czech Republic
- Region: Central Bohemian
- District: Příbram
- First mentioned: 1368

Area
  - Total: 9.02 km^{2} (3.48 sq mi)
- Elevation: 400 m (1,300 ft)

Population (2026-01-01)
  - Total: 403
  - Density: 44.7/km^{2} (116/sq mi)
- Time zone: UTC+1 (CET)
  - Summer (DST): UTC+2 (CEST)
- Postal code: 262 23
- Website: www.obeccenkov.cz

Čenkov is a municipality and village in Příbram District in the Central Bohemian Region of the Czech Republic. It has about 400 inhabitants. It lies on the Litavka River.

== History ==
The first written mention of Čenkov is from 1368.

== Demographics ==
Historical population
Year	Pop.	±%
1869	447	—
1880	451	+0.9%
1890	526	+16.6%
1900	652	+24.0%
1910	643	−1.4%
1921	654	+1.7%
1930	623	−4.7%
1950	610	−2.1%
1961	570	−6.6%
1970	541	−5.1%
1980	419	−22.6%
1991	373	−11.0%
2001	381	+2.1%
2011	405	+6.3%
2021	394	−2.7%
Source: Censuses
