= Václav Hrabě =

Czechoslovak poet and writer (1940–1965)

Václav Hrabě

Václav Hrabě (13 June 1940, Příbram, Czechoslovakia – 5 March 1965, Prague, Czechoslovakia) was a Czech poet and writer, considered to be the most important member of the Beat Generation in the former Czechoslovakia.

== Life ==
Hrabě was born in Příbram to Jan Hrabě and Magdalena Kalinová. He grew up in Lochovice and attended high school in Hořovice. After graduating in 1957, Hrabě moved to Prague and studied Czech language and History at the Faculty of Pedagogy. During his time as a student, he started writing poetry. In 1961, Hrabě graduated from university and was conscripted into the army. Upon his discharge he took a variety of jobs as a laborer, librarian, writer for the literary magazine Tváře ('Faces'), until finally working as a teacher from 1964.

Hrabě was influenced by poets such as František Gellner, Allen Ginsberg, Vladimir Mayakovsky and François Villon. Like other Beat Generation writers, he was also influenced by jazz and blues music; he taught himself to play clarinet and saxophone, and played with several jazz bands during his time as a student. Except poetry and prose, Hrabě also wrote a play which is unfortunately lost. In 1965, Hrabě met and interviewed Allen Ginsberg during his visit to Prague.

Hrabě died of accidental carbon monoxide poisoning while asleep in his apartment in the Malá Strana district of Prague at the age of twenty-four. His untimely death robbed Czech literature of one of the most important poets of his generation. He was briefly married (1962–64) and had a son named Jan Miškovský.

Hrabě is buried in Lochovice. A high school in Hořovice is named Gymnázium Václava Hraběte after him.

== Works ==
Hrabě debuted in 1962 in the magazine Univerzita Karlova ('Charles University'), and some of his poems were also published in army magazines Zápisník ('Notebook'), Československý voják ('Czechoslovak Soldier') and Obrana lidu ('Defense of the People'). As a collection, his poems were published only after his death, however. It was primarily thanks to Miroslav Kovářík that Hrabě's poetry became widely known to his peers. Kovařík began promoting Hrabě as early as in 1965. Between 1965 and 1967, he dedicated literary evenings to Hrabě at the Docela malé divadlo ('Just a Small Theater') in Litvínov; later he edited and helped publish Hrabě's poetry in several editions. Some of Hrabě's poems were also set to music in the 1980s by Vladimír Mišík.

=== Poetry ===
- Stop-time (1969)
- Blues v modré a bílé (1977)
- Korunovační blues (1981)
- Černé nebe nad městem (1985)
- Blues pro bláznivou holku (1990)
- Blues (1995, 1999)

=== Other works ===
- Horečka (short story) (1967, 1994)
- Margot (theatre play, lost)
