= Jince =

- Market town
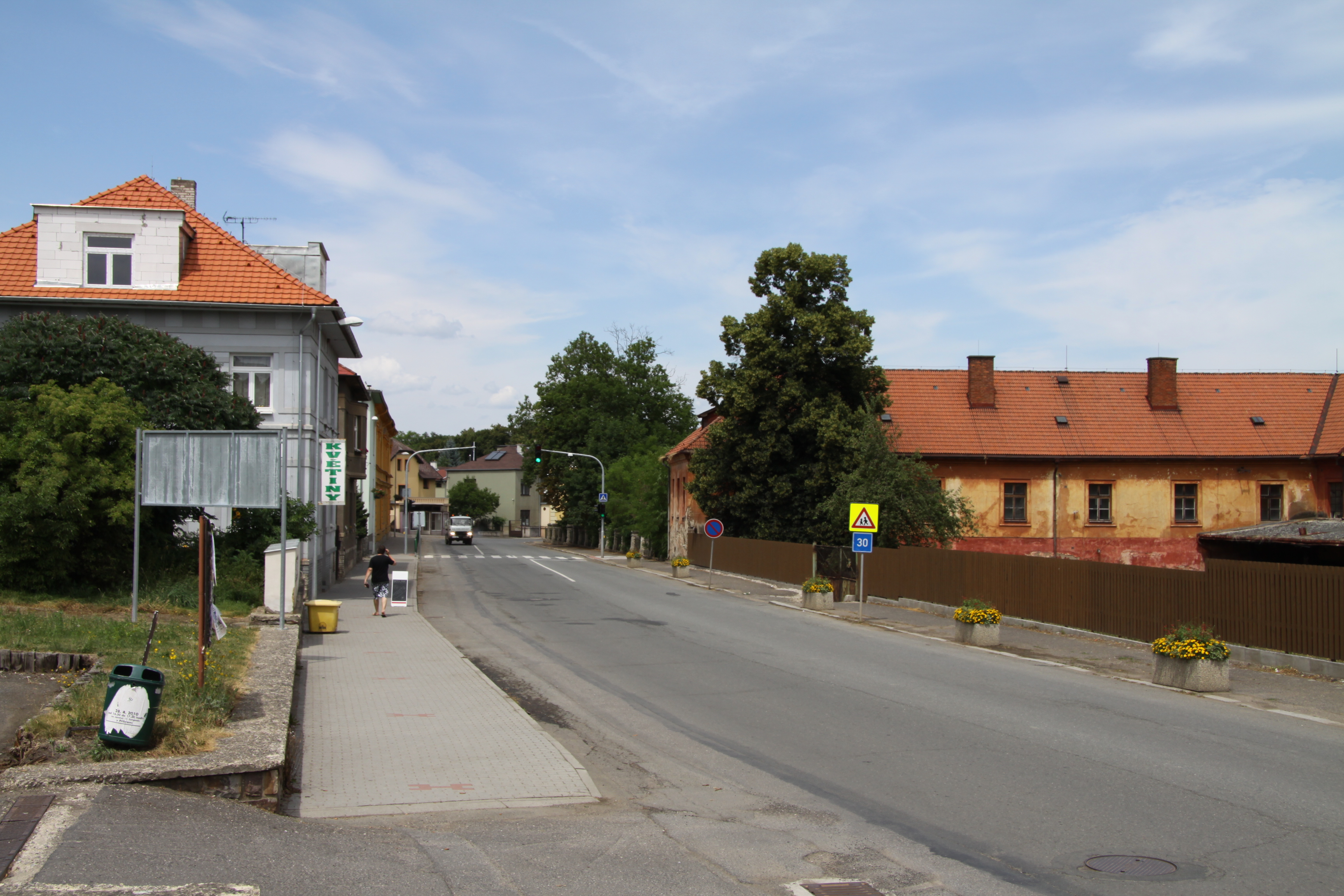
- Main street

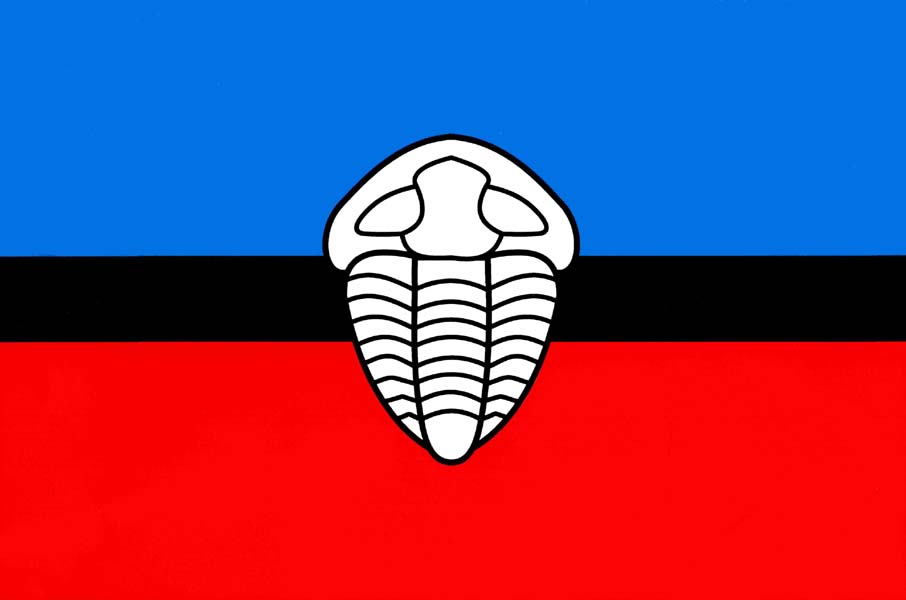
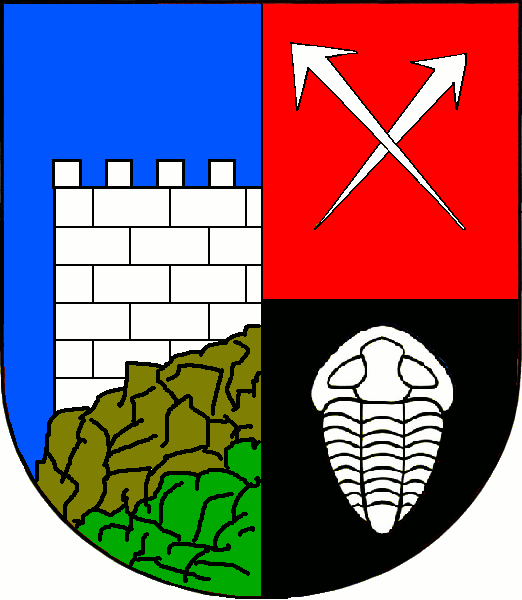
- Flag Coat of arms

- Location in the Czech Republic
- Coordinates: 49°47′11″N 13°58′43″E
- Country: Czech Republic
- Region: Central Bohemian
- District: Příbram
- First mentioned: 1352

Area
  - Total: 36.63 km^{2} (14.14 sq mi)
- Elevation: 391 m (1,283 ft)

Population (2026-01-01)
  - Total: 2,468
  - Density: 67.38/km^{2} (174.5/sq mi)
- Time zone: UTC+1 (CET)
  - Summer (DST): UTC+2 (CEST)
- Postal code: 262 23
- Website: www.jince.cz

Jince (Czech pronunciation: [ˈjɪntsɛ]) is a market town in Příbram District in the Central Bohemian Region of the Czech Republic. It has about 2,500 inhabitants. It is located on the Litavka River in the Brdy Highlands.

== Administrative division ==
Jince consists of four municipal parts (in brackets population according to the 2021 census):

- Jince (2,039)
- Běřín (54)
- Rejkovice (112)
- Velcí (1)

== Etymology ==
The name is derived from the surname Jinec (written as Junec in the oldest documents, meaning 'Jinecs' – "the village of Jinec's family"). The old Czech words junec and jinec, from which the surname arose, meant 'young bull', 'young ox'.

== Geography ==
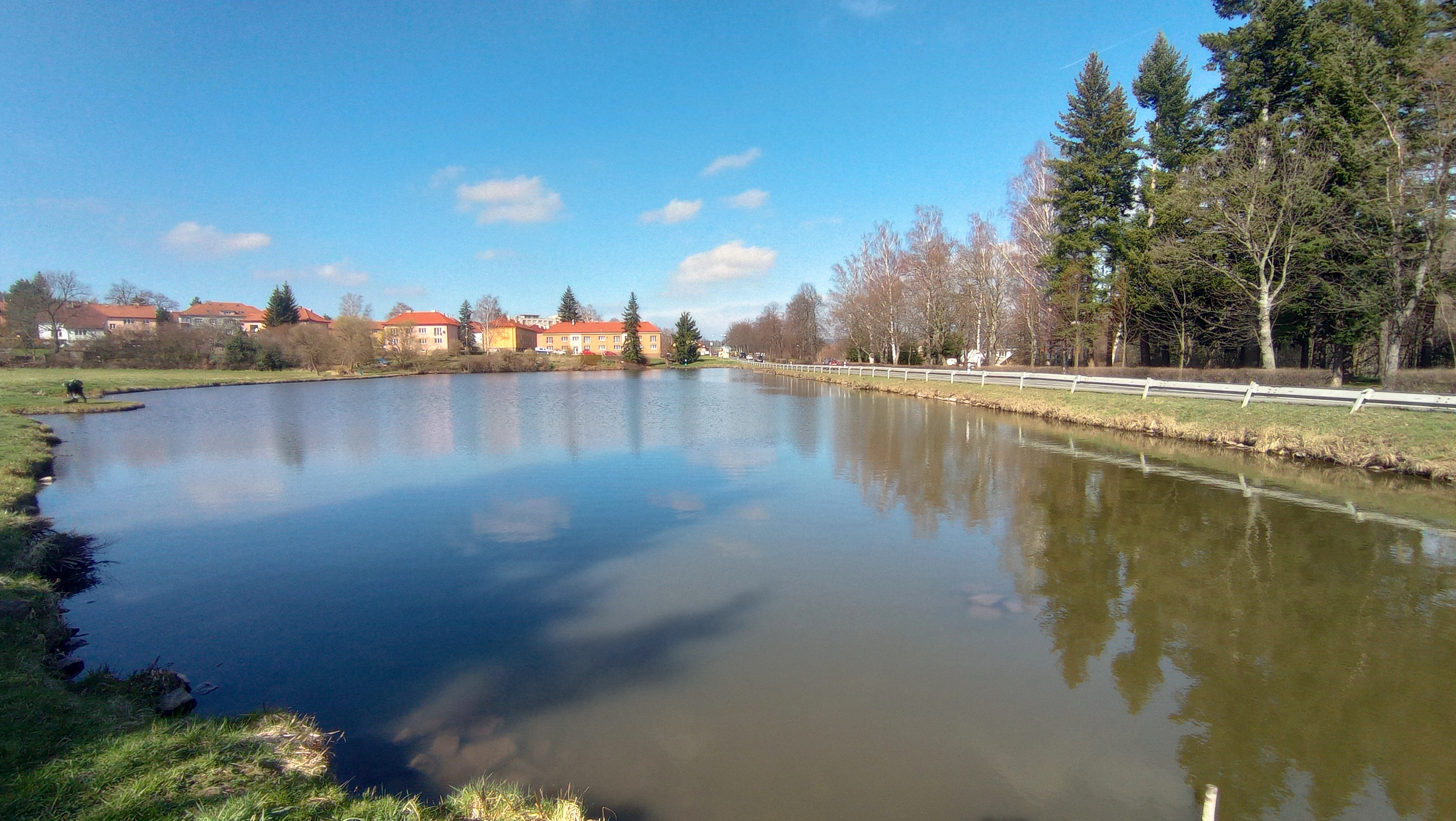
One of the ponds in Jince

Jince is located about 11 kilometres (7 mi) north of Příbram and 40 km (25 mi) southwest of Prague. It lies in the Brdy Highlands. The highest point is at 770 m (2,530 ft) above sea level. The built-up area is situated in the valley of the Litavka River. There are several fishponds in the town, supplied by small streams. The southern part of the municipal territory lies in the Brdy Protected Landscape Area.

== History ==
The first written mention of Jince is from 1352. Iron ore was mined and processed here for several centuries. The first blast furnace is documented in 1646. From 1647 to 1805, the Jince estate was owned by the Wratislaw of Mitrovice family. They were forced to sell the estate due to debts. From 1805, Jince was owned by the Vrbna family, who annexed it to the Hořovice estate.

In 1900, Jince was promoted to a market town.

Until 2015, Jince was adjacent to the Brdy Military Training Area. After the military area was abolished on 1 January 2016, part of the area was annexed to Jince. However, the military area was partly replaced by the Jince Crew Training Ground with entry prohibited.

== Demographics ==
Historical population

Year	Pop.	±%
1869	1,853	—
1880	1,912	+3.2%
1890	1,991	+4.1%
1900	1,855	−6.8%
1910	1,813	−2.3%

Year	Pop.	±%
1921	1,646	−9.2%
1930	1,893	+15.0%
1950	1,455	−23.1%
1961	2,120	+45.7%
1970	1,971	−7.0%

Year	Pop.	±%
1980	1,820	−7.7%
1991	2,246	+23.4%
2001	2,236	−0.4%
2011	2,150	−3.8%
2021	2,206	+2.6%

Source: Censuses

== Transport ==
Jince is located on the railway line Prague–České Budějovice via Příbram.

== Sights ==
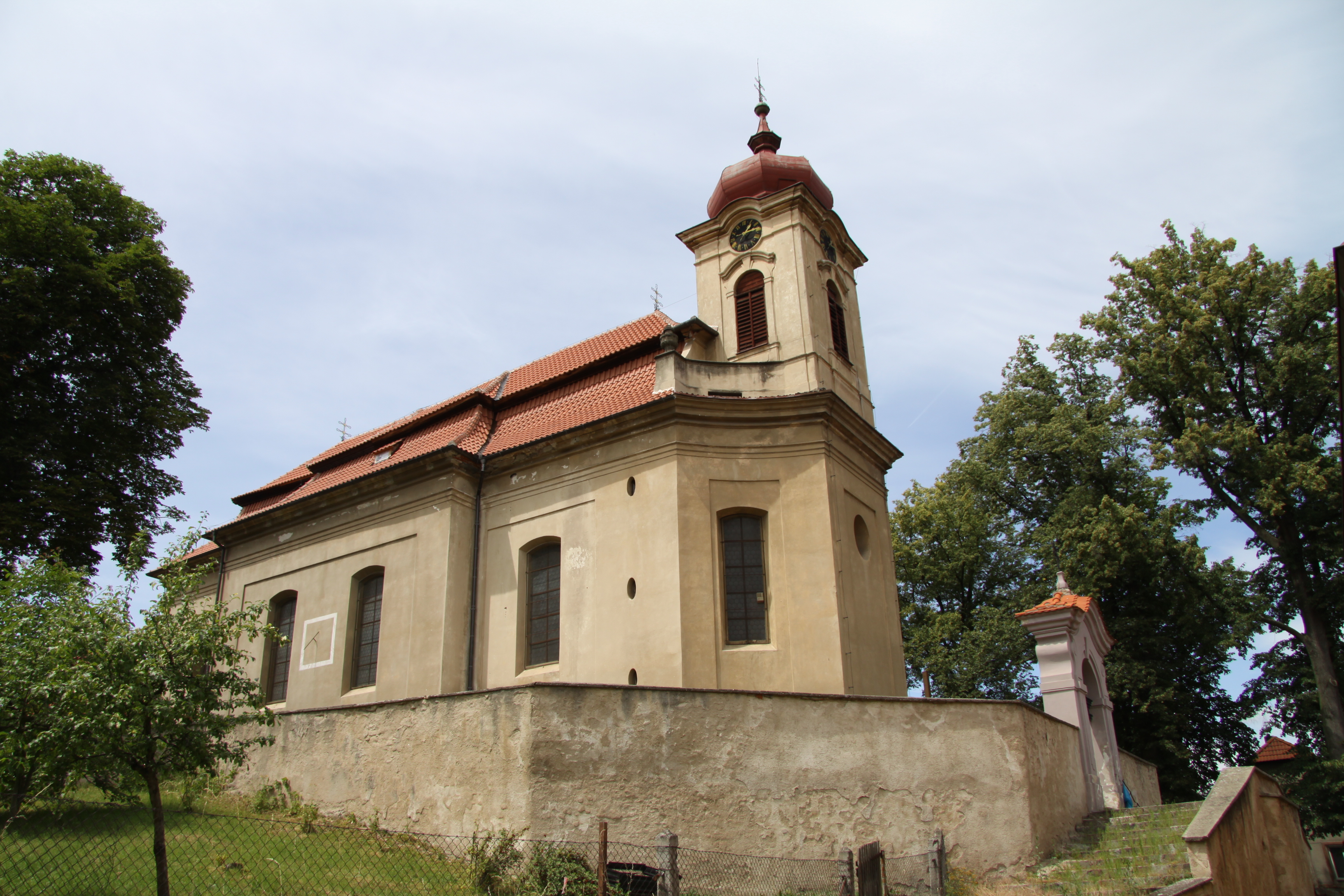
Church of Saint Nicholas

The Church of Saint Nicholas belongs to the main landmarks of Jince. There was a small wooden church, which was replaced by the current Baroque building in 1728–1731.

The Jince Castle was built in the early Baroque style in 1654–1706 on the site of an old medieval fortress, first documented in 1453. It was rebuilt in 1739–1744, the southern wing was rebuilt in 1766–1771. The castle originally served as an aristocratic residence, but in the mid-19th century, it was modified into a brewery. Today the building is unused.

The blast furnace called Barbora was built in 1805–1810. It was the last charcoal blast furnace in Central Europe. It is a technical monument.

== Notable people ==
- Josef Slavík (1806–1833), violin virtuoso
