= Paul Rodriguez =

Paul Rodriguez may refer to:

- Paul Rodriguez (actor) (born 1955), Mexican-American stand-up comedian and actor
- Paul Rodríguez, financial advisor and candidate in the 2022 New York State Comptroller election
- Paul Rodriguez (skateboarder) (born 1984), American professional street skateboarder and actor, son of Paul Rodriguez (actor)
- Brian Rodríguez (Paul Brian Rodríguez Bravo, born 2000), Uruguayan footballer
- "Paul Rodriguez", a song by Logic from Ultra 85

== See also ==
- Paulo Rodrigues (disambiguation)
- Paulo Rodriguez (disambiguation)
