= Paulo Rodrigues (footballer, born 1986) =

Brazilian footballer

Personal information
- Full name: Paulo Rodrigues da Silva
- Date of birth: 10 November 1986
- Place of birth: Ipixuna do Pará, Brazil
- Date of death: 2 January 2012 (aged 25)
- Place of death: Bohutín, Czech Republic
- Height: 1.75 m (5 ft 9 in)
- Position: Striker

Youth career
- –2007: Assisense

Senior career*
Years	Team	Apps	(Gls)
2007	Fotbal Třinec		
2008–2010	Viktoria Plzeň		
2009–2010	→ 1. FK Příbram (loan)	25	(3)
- * Club domestic league appearances and goals

Paulo Rodrigues da Silva (10 November 1986 – 2 January 2012) was a Brazilian professional footballer, who played as a striker for the Czech club Viktoria Plzeň. He died on 2 January 2012 following a car crash near Bohutín (Příbram District). He was 25.
