= Libomyšl =

- Municipality
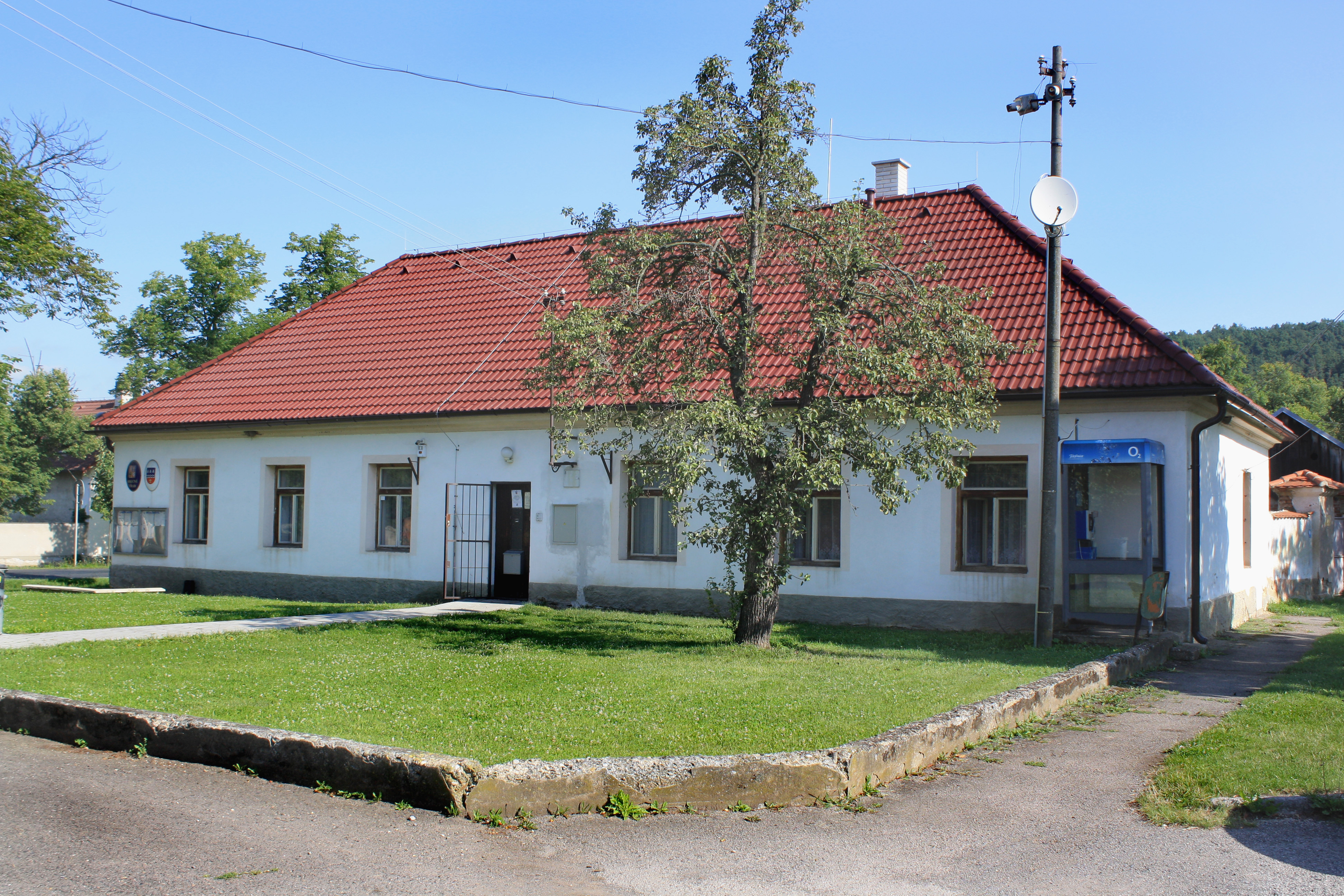
- Municipal office

- Flag Coat of arms

- Location in the Czech Republic
- Coordinates: 49°52′21″N 13°59′55″E
- Country: Czech Republic
- Region: Central Bohemian
- District: Beroun
- First mentioned: 1370

Area
  - Total: 9.70 km^{2} (3.75 sq mi)
- Elevation: 285 m (935 ft)

Population (2026-01-01)
  - Total: 639
  - Density: 65.9/km^{2} (171/sq mi)
- Time zone: UTC+1 (CET)
  - Summer (DST): UTC+2 (CEST)
- Postal codes: 267 01, 267 23
- Website: www.libomysl-be.cz

Libomyšl is a municipality and village in Beroun District in the Central Bohemian Region of the Czech Republic. It has about 600 inhabitants.

== Administrative division ==
Libomyšl consists of two municipal parts (in brackets population according to the 2021 census):

- Libomyšl (576)
- Želkovice (63)

== Etymology ==
The name is derived from the personal name Libomysl, meaning "Libomysl's (court)".

== Geography ==
Libomyšl is located about 10 kilometres (6 mi) southwest of Beroun and 31 km (19 mi) southwest of Prague. It lies in the Hořovice Uplands. The highest point is at 435 m (1,427 ft) above sea level. The Litavka River flows through the municipality.

== History ==
The first written mention of Libomyšl is from 1370.

== Demographics ==
Historical population

Year	Pop.	±%
1869	937	—
1880	912	−2.7%
1890	902	−1.1%
1900	904	+0.2%
1910	903	−0.1%

Year	Pop.	±%
1921	888	−1.7%
1930	930	+4.7%
1950	714	−23.2%
1961	719	+0.7%
1970	623	−13.4%

Year	Pop.	±%
1980	589	−5.5%
1991	469	−20.4%
2001	480	+2.3%
2011	528	+10.0%
2021	639	+21.0%

Source: Censuses

== Transport ==
Libomyšl is located on the railway line Beroun–Strakonice.

== Sights ==
Among the protected cultural monuments in the municipality are a chapel from the end of the 18th century and a cross from 1907, located in the centre of the village, and a locality where a fortress stood in the 13th–15th centuries.
