= Josef Fiala =

Czech composer adn oboist (1748–1816)

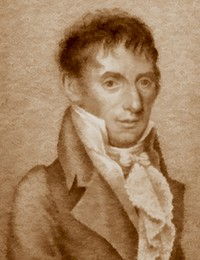
- Portrait of Fiala
- Born: 3 February 1748; Lochovice, Bohemia, Holy Roman Empire
- Died: 31 July 1816 (aged 68); Donaueschingen, Grand Duchy of Baden
- Occupations: Composer; oboist; cellist

Josef Fiala (German: Joseph Fiala; 3 February 1748 – 31 July 1816) was a Czech composer, oboist, viola da gamba virtuoso, cellist and pedagogue of the Classical period.

== Life ==
He was born in Lochovice in Bohemia and began his musical career there as an oboist in the service of Countess Valpruga Netolická. The countess supported his studies of oboe with Jan Šťastný in Prague. He also studied violoncello and viola da gamba with František Josef Werner. In 1774, he left to Bavaria to play the oboe in the orchestra of Count Ernst Kraft von Oettingen-Wallerstein. In 1777 he moved to Munich to serve in the court orchestra of Elector Maximilian Joseph. Here he married Josefina Procházková, a daughter of his colleague from the orchestra, horn player Matyáš Procházka. That year in Munich, Wolfgang Amadeus Mozart befriended Fiala and was greatly impressed by his compositions. After the death of the Elector in 1778 Mozart helped him secure a position in Salzburg.

From 1778 to 1785, Fiala lived in Mozart's birth house at Getreidegasse No. 9 in Salzburg. He was an oboist for archbishop Hieronymus von Colloredo's orchestra and played violin and violoncello in Salzburger Landestheater. In 1785 Fiala moved to Vienna, where he served as a horn player for Nikolaus II, Prince Esterházy, and in 1786 to Saint Petersburg where he worked in the court of Catherine the Great. After his return from Russia, he toured over Europe playing his own compositions. In 1790 he played viola da gamba for King Friedrich Wilhelm II. Finally in 1792 he became Kapellmeister, cellist and composer for Joseph Maria, Prince of Fürstenberg in Donaueschingen, where he spent the rest of his life.

== Works ==
=== Concertos ===
- Concerto for Violin, Oboe, Viola and Violoncello
- Concerto for 2 Oboes
- Concerto for English Horn and Clarinet in B♭ Major
- Concerto for 2 French Horns in E♭ major
- Concerto for Violoncello in G major
- Concerto for Flute in D major
- Concerto for Oboe in B♭ major
- Concerto for English Horn E♭ major
- Concerto for English Horn and Orchestra in C major
- Concerto for Bassoon in C major
- Concerto for Trumpet in G minor

=== Chamber music ===
- 30 works pro 5–10 wind instruments
- 24 quartets
- 10 trios
- 7 pieces for violin and violoncello
- 3 pieces for violoncello and contrabass
- 1 piece for 2 flutes
- 2 pieces for flute or oboe and bassoon
- 2 pieces for oboe and violin
- 2 pieces for oboe and viola

=== Other ===
- 10 symphonies
- Rondo for harpsichord and violin
- 2 sonatas for harpsichord
- 12 German Dances for Harpsichord
- Masses
- Ave Maria

== Legacy ==
During Fiala's tenure in the court of Friedrich Wilhelm II, the king honored Josef by giving him his own family crest.
