= Míšov =

- Municipality
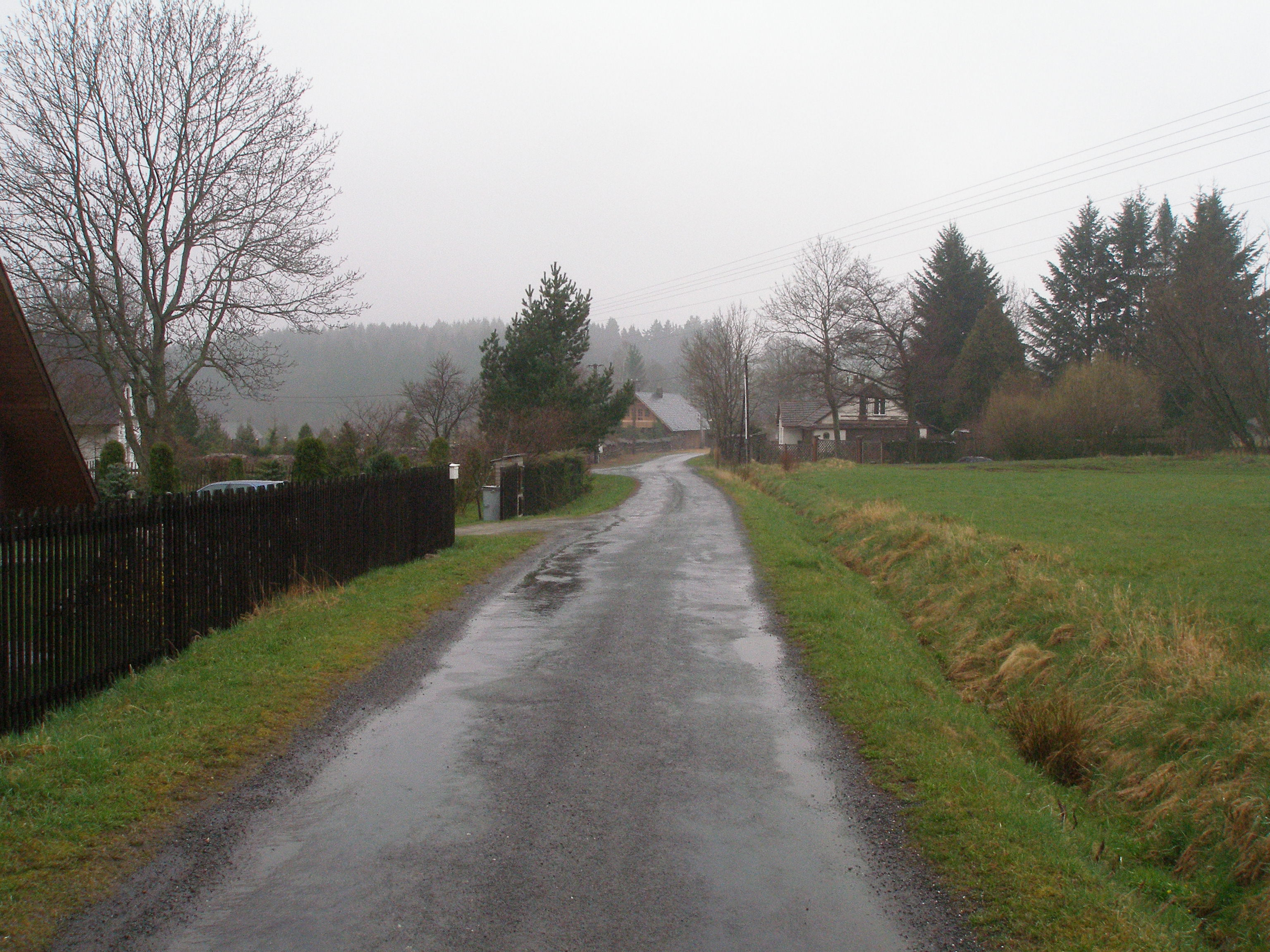
- Southern part of Míšov

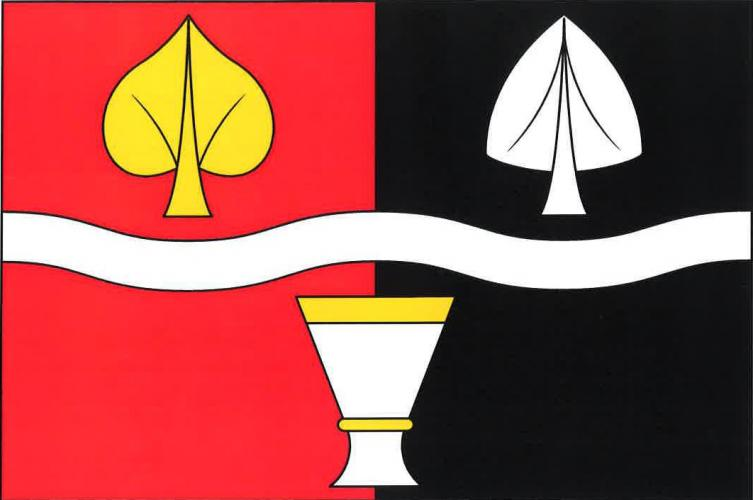
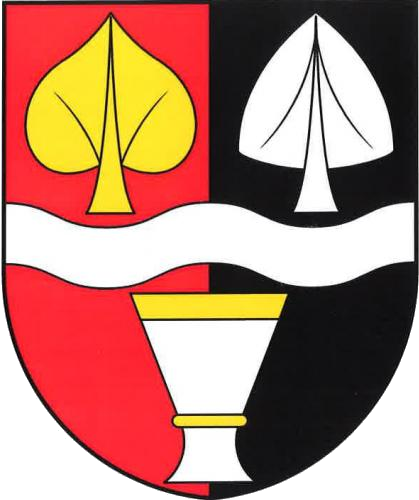
- Flag Coat of arms

- Location in the Czech Republic
- Coordinates: 49°37′11″N 13°43′42″E
- Country: Czech Republic
- Region: Plzeň
- District: Plzeň-South
- First mentioned: 1349

Area
  - Total: 9.88 km^{2} (3.81 sq mi)
- Elevation: 620 m (2,030 ft)

Population (2026-01-01)
  - Total: 111
  - Density: 11.2/km^{2} (29.1/sq mi)
- Time zone: UTC+1 (CET)
  - Summer (DST): UTC+2 (CEST)
- Postal code: 335 63
- Website: www.misov.cz

Míšov is a municipality and village in Plzeň-South District in the Plzeň Region of the Czech Republic. It has about 100 inhabitants.

Míšov lies approximately 31 kilometres (19 mi) south-east of Plzeň and 73 km (45 mi) south-west of Prague.

== Demographics ==
Historical population
Year	Pop.	±%
1869	442	—
1880	477	+7.9%
1890	444	−6.9%
1900	371	−16.4%
1910	327	−11.9%
1921	319	−2.4%
1930	285	−10.7%
1950	229	−19.6%
1961	229	+0.0%
1970	185	−19.2%
1980	139	−24.9%
1991	114	−18.0%
2001	121	+6.1%
2011	103	−14.9%
2021	107	+3.9%
Source: Censuses
