= Vranovice (Příbram District) =

- Municipality
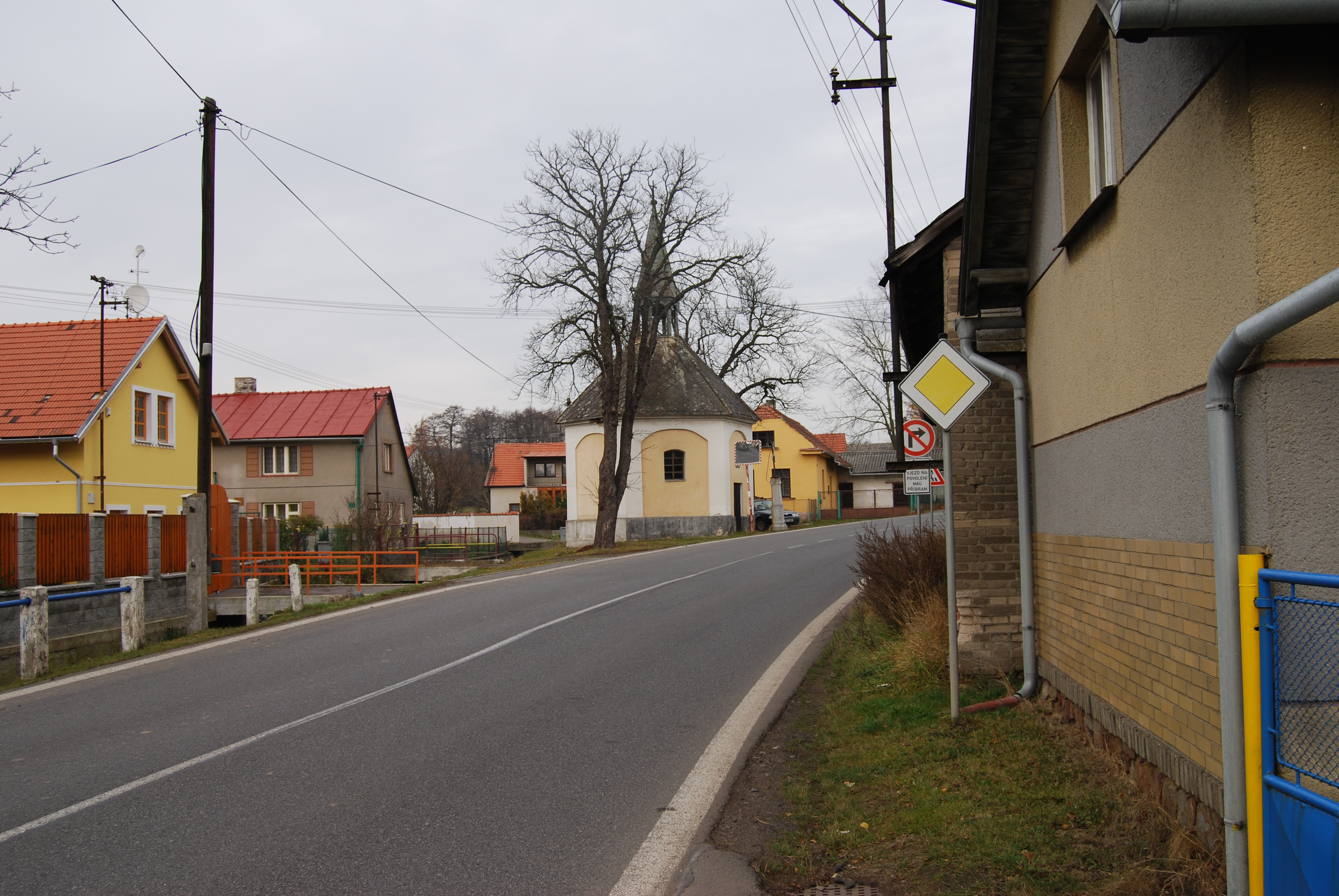
- Main street

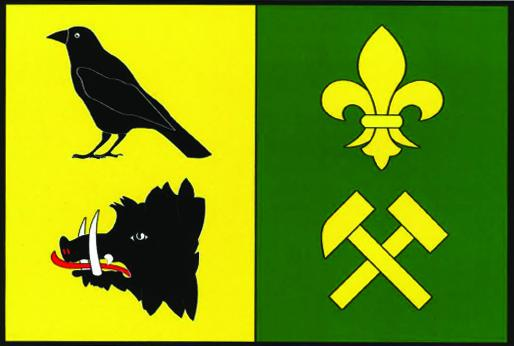
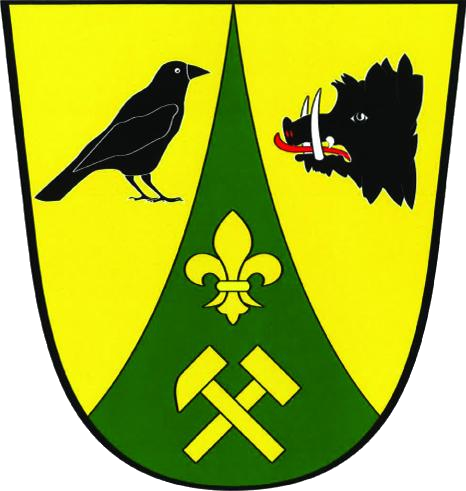
- Flag Coat of arms

- Location in the Czech Republic
- Coordinates: 49°37′22″N 13°53′56″E
- Country: Czech Republic
- Region: Central Bohemian
- District: Příbram
- First mentioned: 1318

Area
  - Total: 13.87 km^{2} (5.36 sq mi)
- Elevation: 538 m (1,765 ft)

Population (2026-01-01)
  - Total: 336
  - Density: 24.2/km^{2} (62.7/sq mi)
- Time zone: UTC+1 (CET)
  - Summer (DST): UTC+2 (CEST)
- Postal code: 262 42
- Website: www.obec-vranovice.cz

Vranovice is a municipality and village in Příbram District in the Central Bohemian Region of the Czech Republic. It has about 300 inhabitants.

== Demographics ==
Historical population
Year	Pop.	±%
1869	558	—
1880	615	+10.2%
1890	634	+3.1%
1900	583	−8.0%
1910	564	−3.3%
1921	547	−3.0%
1930	452	−17.4%
1950	418	−7.5%
1961	373	−10.8%
1970	348	−6.7%
1980	292	−16.1%
1991	258	−11.6%
2001	248	−3.9%
2011	287	+15.7%
2021	297	+3.5%
Source: Censuses
