= Brdy =

Hill range in the Czech Republic

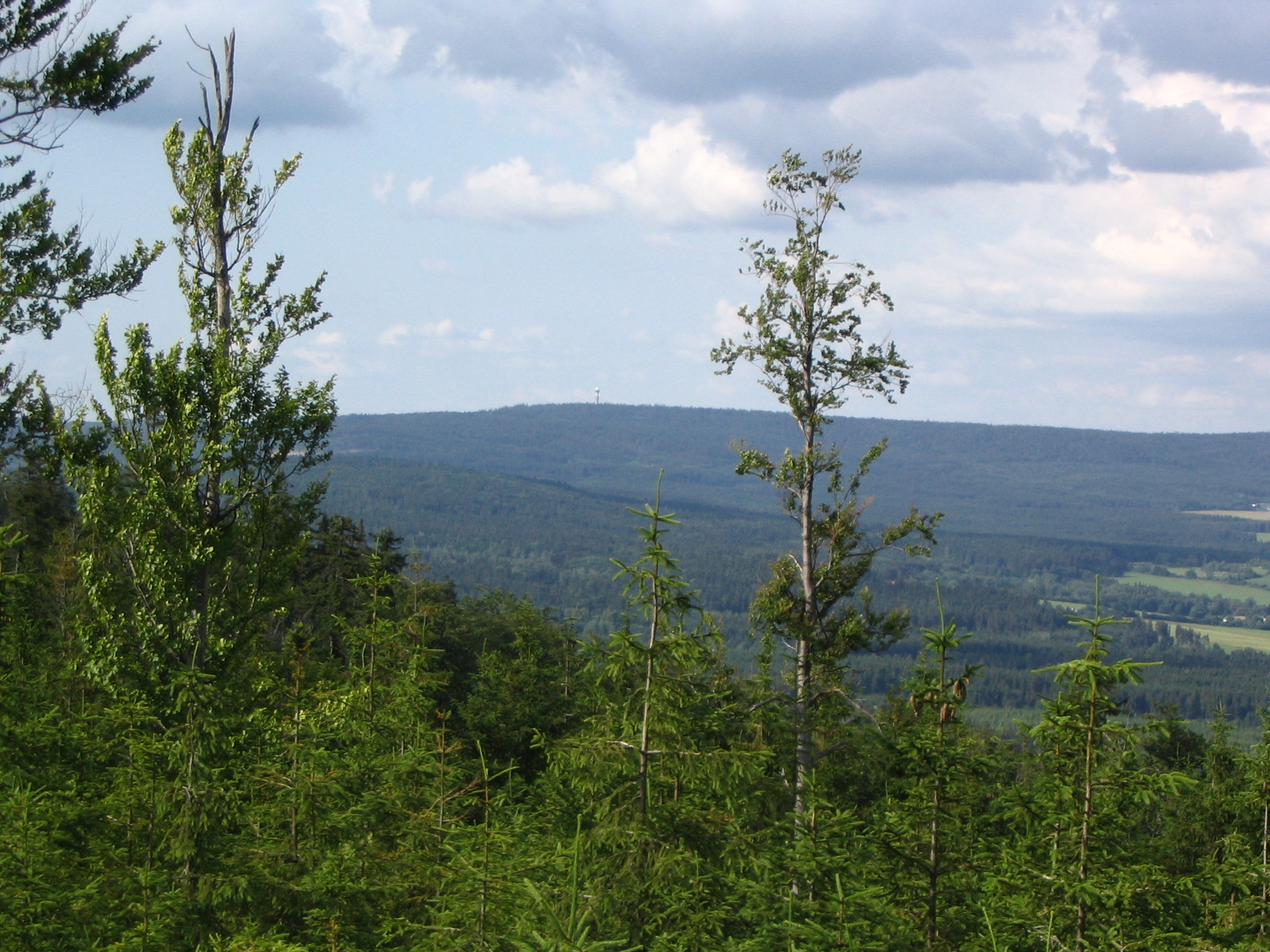
Praha hill (second highest summit of Brdy) seen from Třemšín hill

Brdy is a range of hills in the Czech Republic, forming a long massif stretching for c. 60 km southwest from Prague. The northern section of the Brdy is called "Hřebeny" and features one narrow ridge (highest elevation Písek - 690 m). The main Brdy range starts south of the Litavka river gorge and consists of several major elevations connected into one plateau, the highest peaks among them being Tok (864 m), Praha (862 m) or Třemšín (827 m). Most of the Brdy is covered by forest, and it is one of the largest contiguously forested areas in the interior of the country. Large sections of the massif were designated as a restricted military area and closed to the public. The Brdy military area has been a source of controversy for several decades.

== Military area ==
The restricted military area was established in 1925, shortly after creation of Czechoslovakia, to cater for the needs of Czechoslovakia's growing armed forces. It was expanded and used extensively by Third Reich military forces from 1939-1945 during the Nazi Occupation of Czechoslovakia. It continued to be used for intensive military exercises in the post-war era, with some additional expansion in the southern sector. After the Warsaw Pact invasion of Czechoslovakia in August 1968, a small Red Army base was situated in the south of the area near Mirošov, until the repatriation of the troops in 1993.

Military use of the Brdy mountains gradually decreased after the Velvet Revolution in 1989, as a result of military cost-cutting and eventual professionalization in 2005. However, the central part of the Brdy mountain area retains its restricted military status.

The Brdy mountains were a focus of negotiations with American negotiators attempting to agree a deal with Czech government to install a Ground-Based Midcourse Defense missile defense radar system in the military area. However, the missile defence plans were reshaped during the Obama administration and the plan was cancelled.

== Infrastructure ==
No substantial development has taken place in the Brdy mountains since 1925. The lack of man-made changes has left the local flora and fauna to flourish undisturbed. The national forestry company (České lesy) was responsible for maintaining large areas of the mountains, and still is in the central parts, while northern areas have seen restitution to legal ownership.

There are several major roads running across the mountains, some of them restricted to vehicles with valid military or forestry permits. There are a few buildings remaining in these mountains, usually in lateral areas or at the most elevated points. As well as several hunting lodges, used by prominent visitors, hunters and forestry workers, these facilities include:

- a Cold War military bunker, turned into an Atomic Weapons Museum.
- the 194 m tall Cukrák transmitter, a broadcasting and transmitting tower on the hill Cukrák, close to Prague.
- Skalka (Mníšek pod Brdy), a baroque chapel of Mary Magdalene and monastery on the cliff above the town of Mníšek pod Brdy.
- an abandoned Surface-to-Air Missile S-200 (SA-5 Gammon) base known as Klondajk, with three long-range SAM launchers spread over several square kilometers near the town of Dobříš.
- a geodetic tower 638 m above sea level at Studený Vrch, near Hostomice pod Brdy, formerly used for military exercises, and currently under the ownership of the Czech Tourist Club.
- a Czech air traffic control radar complex, 683 m above sea level on the hill Písek, near Jince.
- a Meteorological radar belonging to the Czech Hydrometeorological Institute (CHMI), 862 m above sea level on Praha mountain, monitoring precipitation over Bohemia. This radar is a part of the European NEXRAD network.
- a prototype concrete bunker, built in the 1930s at one of the shooting grounds to test weapon efficiency and bunker design, later featured in the Czech film The Elementary School.
- a monument to prominent local forester and administrator Gangloff, near Třemšín pod Brdy.

== Potential future developments ==
Several studies have been carried out on the future of the Brdy mountains, with particular focus on preserving its natural state. This was contradicted by government plans to create a new US high-security military installation in the military area. In late 2008, press reports indicated that the radar site would be about two kilometres northeast of Mišov, approximately at 49.64°N 13.74°E. A fierce public debate followed, with the majority of the media and the government supporting the project, and local residents and peace activists opposing it. Public opinion was divided, but a majority of Czechs were opposed. This debate became the focus of the Czech documentary comedy, Czech Peace (2010). In December 2014, the Czech parliament passed a law abolishing the military status of the Brdy mountains, which will come into effect in January 2016. There is an ongoing dispute, as the new legislation includes some other changes, including border changes between the Central Bohemian and Plzeň regions, with Plzeň Region taking over a significant area of the current Central Bohemian Region.

In February 2025, authorities realized that beavers populating the area had naturally established a series of dams, achieving the intended environmental objectives without human intervention.
