= Svojšice =

Svojšice may refer to:

- Svojšice (Pardubice District), a village in Pardubice Region, Czech Republic
- Svojšice (Kolín District), a village and municipality in Kolín District, Czech Republic
- Svojšice (Příbram District), a village and municipality in Příbram District, Czech Republic
