= Haje =

Haje may refer to:

== Places ==
- Háje (Prague Metro)
- Háje (Příbram District), a village and municipality in the Central Bohemian Region of the Czech Republic

== People ==
- Khrystyne Haje (born 1968), American actor
- Sydney Haje (1952–2012), Brazilian orthopedist
- Hajé Schartman (1937–2008), Dutch politician
- Haje Jan Kamps (born 1981), Dutch inventor and photojournalist

== Other uses ==
- An alternative name for the Egyptian cobra (Naja haje)
