= Kresin =

Křešín or Křesín may refer to places in the Czech Republic:

- Křesín, a municipality and village in the Ústí nad Labem Region
- Křešín (Příbram District), a municipality and village in the Central Bohemian Region
- Křešín (Pelhřimov District), a municipality and village in the Vysočina Region
