= Nepomuk (disambiguation) =

Nepomuk is a town in the Plzeň Region of the Czech Republic.

Nepomuk also may refer to:

- NEPOMUK (framework), software framework
- Nepomuk (Příbram District), a village and municipality in the Central Bohemian Region of the Czech Republic
- Nepomuk, fictional character in Thomas Mann's novel Doctor Faustus
- John of Nepomuk, Czech saint
- The part of the compound given name Johann Nepomuk given in honor of the saint
