= Příbram District =

Příbram District Okres Příbram
- District
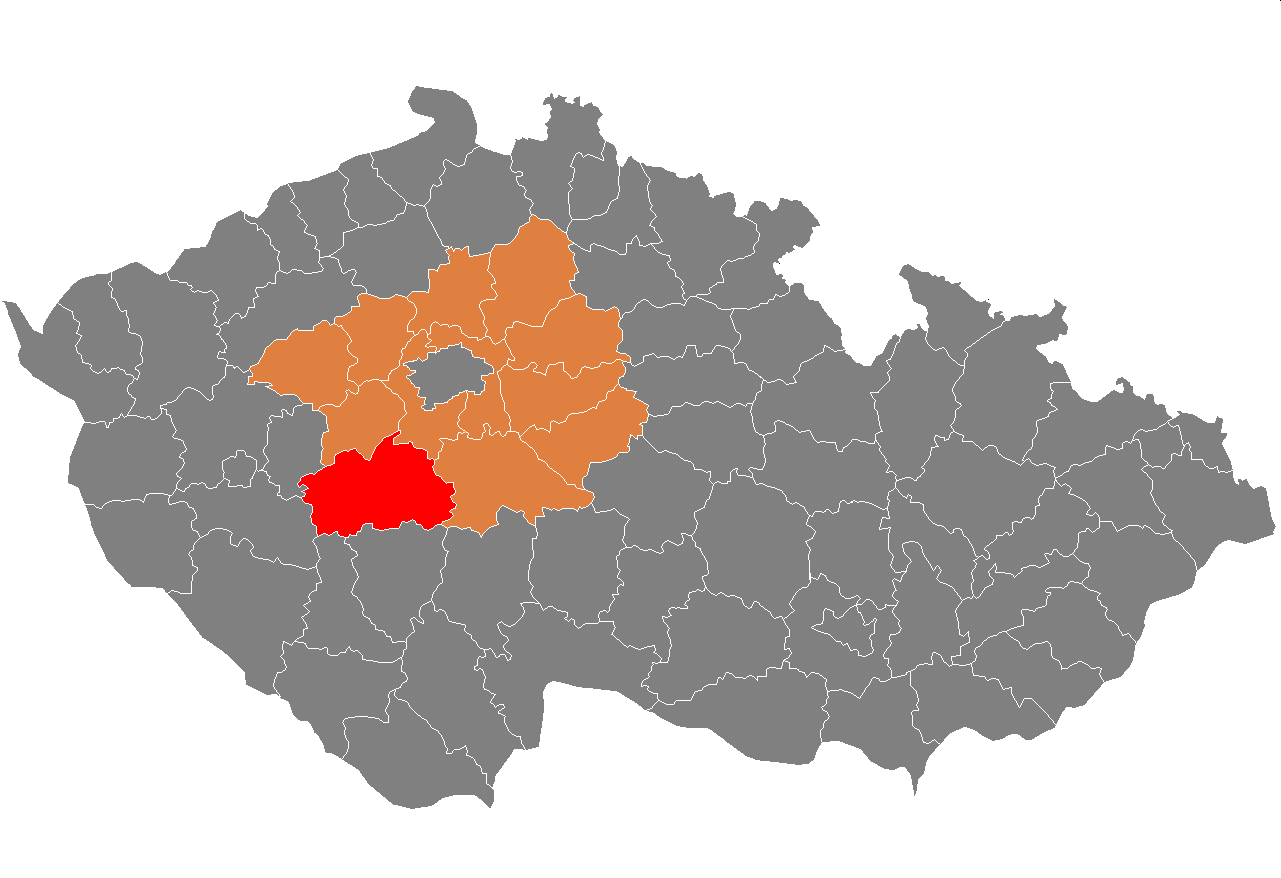
- Location in the Central Bohemian Region within the Czech Republic
- Coordinates: 49°40′N 14°9′E
- Country: Czech Republic
- Region: Central Bohemian
- Capital: Příbram

Area
  - Total: 1,562.92 km^{2} (603.45 sq mi)

Population (2026)
  - Total: 118,487
  - Density: 75.8113/km^{2} (196.350/sq mi)
- Time zone: UTC+1 (CET)
  - Summer (DST): UTC+2 (CEST)
- Municipalities: 120
- * Towns: 8
- * Market towns: 2

Příbram District (Czech: okres Příbram) is a district in the Central Bohemian Region of the Czech Republic. Its capital is the town of Příbram.

== Administrative division ==
Příbram District is divided into three administrative districts of municipalities with extended competence: Dobříš and Sedlčany.

=== List of municipalities ===
Towns are marked in bold and market towns in italics:

Bezděkov pod Třemšínem - Bohostice - Bohutín - Borotice - Bratkovice - Březnice - Buková u Příbramě - Bukovany - Čenkov - Cetyně - Chotilsko - Chrást - Chraštice - Čím - Daleké Dušníky - Dlouhá Lhota - Dobříš - Dolní Hbity - Drahenice - Drahlín - Drásov - Drevníky - Drhovy - Dubenec - Dubno - Dublovice - Háje - Hluboš - Hlubyně - Horčápsko - Hudčice - Hřiměždice - Hvožďany - Jablonná - Jesenice - Jince - Kamýk nad Vltavou - Klučenice - Kňovice - Korkyně - Kosova Hora - Kotenčice - Koupě - Kozárovice - Krásná Hora nad Vltavou - Křepenice - Křešín - Láz - Lazsko - Lešetice - Lhota u Příbramě - Malá Hraštice - Milešov - Milín - Modřovice - Mokrovraty - Nalžovice - Narysov - Nečín - Nedrahovice - Nechvalice - Nepomuk - Nestrašovice - Nová Ves pod Pleší - Nové Dvory - Nový Knín - Občov - Obecnice - Obory - Obořiště - Ohrazenice - Osečany - Ostrov - Ouběnice - Pečice - Petrovice - Pičín - Počaply - Počepice - Podlesí - Prosenická Lhota - Příbram - Příčovy - Radětice - Radíč - Rosovice - Rožmitál pod Třemšínem - Rybníky - Sádek - Sedlčany - Sedlec-Prčice - Sedlice - Smolotely - Solenice - Stará Huť - Starosedlský Hrádek - Štětkovice - Suchodol - Svaté Pole - Svatý Jan - Svojšice - Těchařovice - Tochovice - Třebsko - Trhové Dušníky - Tušovice - Velká Lečice - Věšín - Višňová - Volenice - Voznice - Vrančice - Vranovice - Vševily - Vysoká u Příbramě - Vysoký Chlumec - Zalužany - Zbenice - Zduchovice - Županovice

== Geography ==
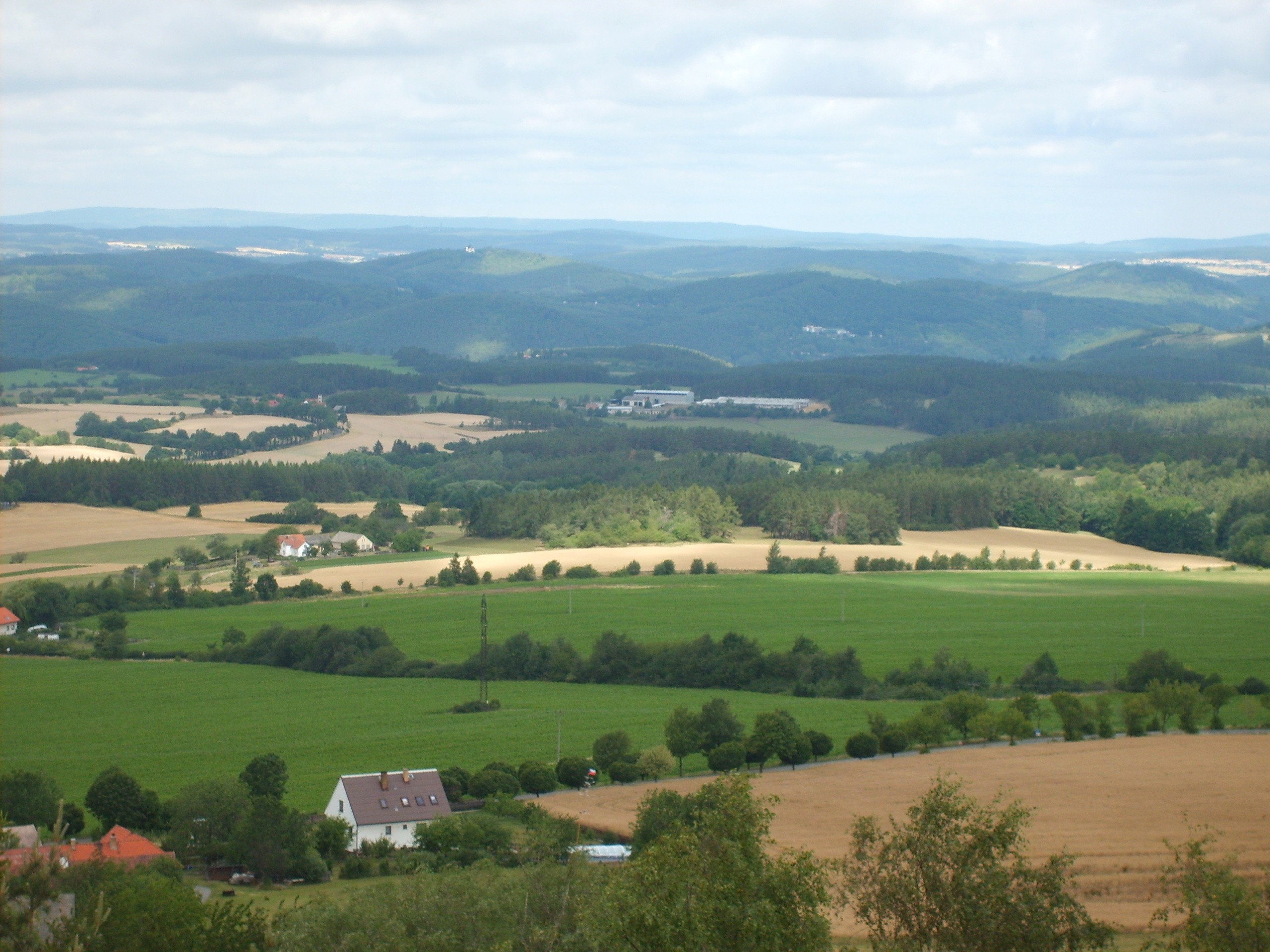
Southern part of the district

The landscape is characterised by undulating terrain. From wide valleys in the east, the landscape gradually rises to long ridges and plateaus in the west, and here are the highest elevations in the region. The territory extends into three geomorphological mesoregions: Benešov Uplands (most of the territory), Brdy Highlands (west) and Vlašim Uplands (southeast). The highest point of the district and the whole Central Bohemian Region is the mountain Tok in Obecnice with an elevation of 865 m (2,838 ft) and the lowest point is the river bed of the Kocába in Velká Lečice at 265 m (869 ft).

From the total district area of 1,562.9 km^{2} (603.4 sq mi), agricultural land occupies 746.8 km^{2} (288.3 sq mi), forests occupy 635.3 km^{2} (245.3 sq mi), and water area occupies 42.1 km^{2} (16.3 sq mi). Forests cover 40.6% of the district's area.

The most important river is the Vltava, which flows across the district from south to north. Other notable rivers are the Litavka and Kocába. The Lomnice and Klabava rivers originate here. The most significant bodies of water are the reservoirs Orlík, Kamýk and Slapy, built on the Vltava. There are also relatively many small ponds.

Brdy is the only protected landscape area that extends into the district, in its western part.

== Demographics ==
Historical population

Year	Pop.	±%
1869	121,761	—
1880	127,603	+4.8%
1890	131,645	+3.2%
1900	130,488	−0.9%
1910	124,838	−4.3%

Year	Pop.	±%
1921	115,632	−7.4%
1930	108,663	−6.0%
1950	88,733	−18.3%
1961	104,930	+18.3%
1970	106,730	+1.7%

Year	Pop.	±%
1980	111,949	+4.9%
1991	112,007	+0.1%
2001	110,650	−1.2%
2011	112,795	+1.9%
2021	115,001	+2.0%

Source: Censuses

=== Most populous municipalities ===
Name	Population	Area (km^{2})
Příbram	32,917	36
Dobříš	8,882	53
Sedlčany	6,784	36
Rožmitál pod Třemšínem	4,255	53
Březnice	3,546	19
Sedlec-Prčice	2,952	64
Jince	2,468	37
Milín	2,184	24
Nový Knín	2,156	30
Bohutín	2,030	8

== Economy ==
The largest employers with headquarters in Příbram District and at least 500 employees are:

Economic entity	Location	Number of employees	Main activity
Regional Hospital Příbram	Příbram	1,500–1,999	Health care
Doosan Bobcat EMEA	Dobříš	1,500–1,999	Manufacture of machinery and equipment
KOSTAL Connectors	Čenkov	500–999	Manufacture of automotive parts

== Transport ==
The D4 motorway from Prague to Písek, including its unfinished section, passes through the district.

== Sights ==
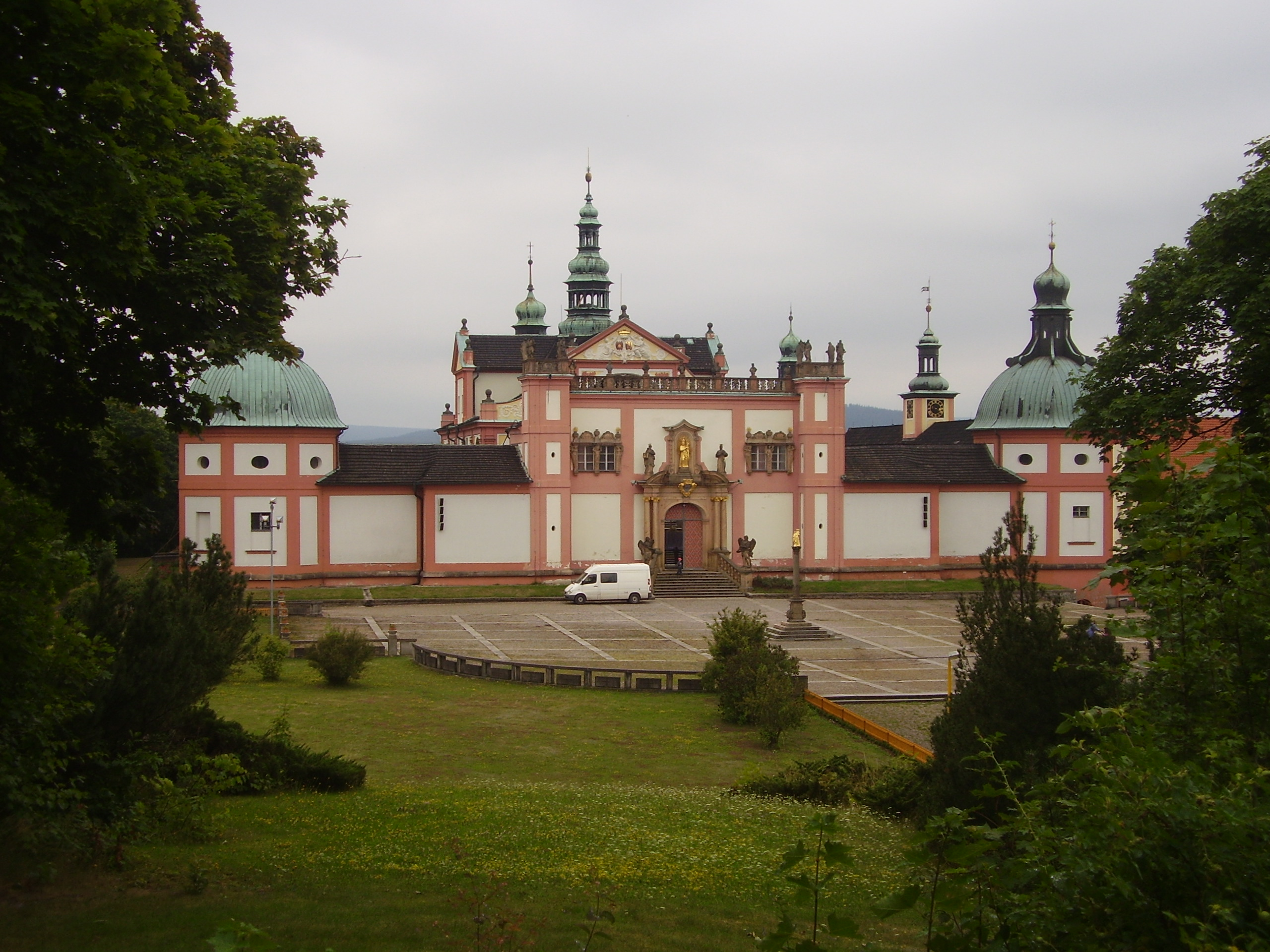
Svatá Hora

The most important monuments in the district, protected as national cultural monuments, are:

- Svatá Hora pilgrimage site in Příbram
- Březnice Castle
- A set of mining monuments in Příbram-Březové Hory

The best-preserved settlements, protected as monument reservations and monument zones, are:

- Drahenice (monument reservation)
- Březnice
- Nový Knín
- Rožmitál pod Třemšínem
- Sedlec-Prčice
- Drahenice-Račany
- Kojetín
- Porešín

The most visited tourist destination is the Svatá Hora pilgrimage site in Příbram.
