= Hudčice =

- Municipality
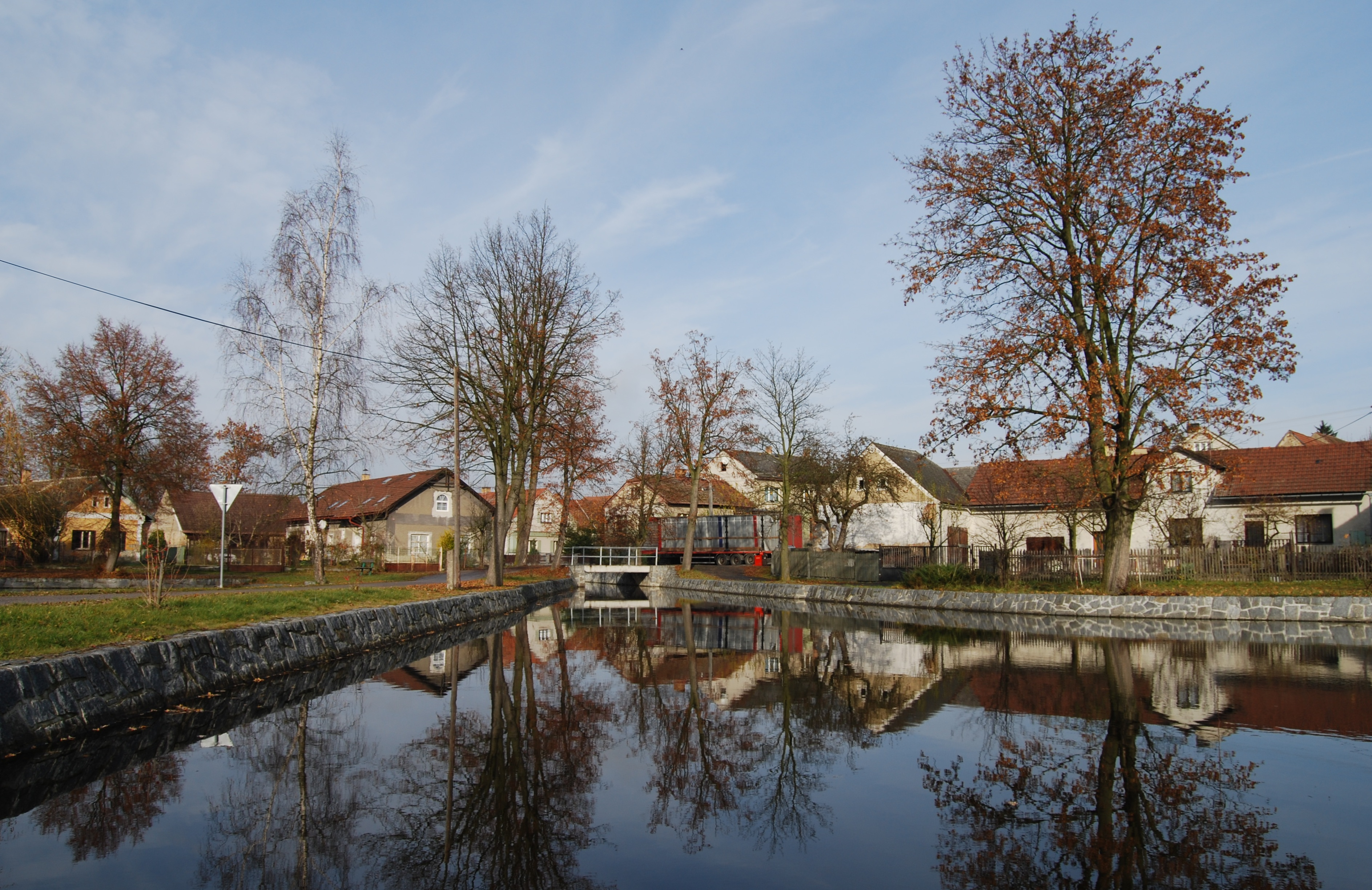
- Houses around a pond

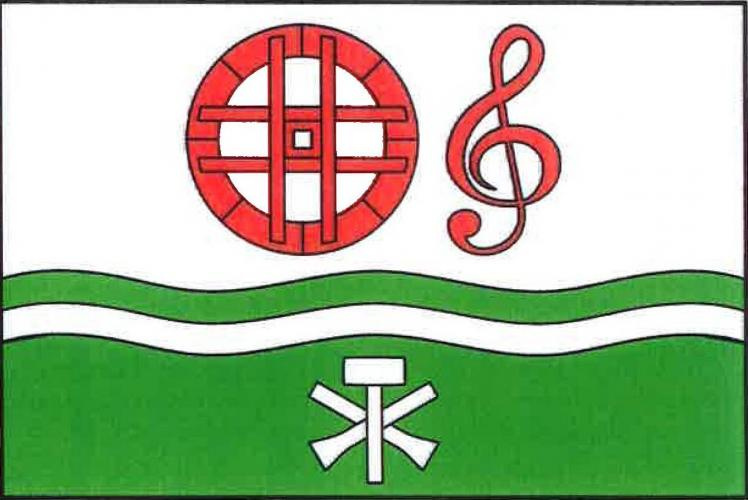
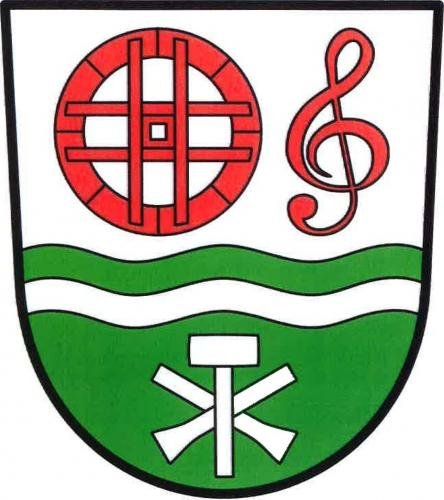
- Flag Coat of arms

- Location in the Czech Republic
- Coordinates: 49°31′54″N 13°55′21″E
- Country: Czech Republic
- Region: Central Bohemian
- District: Příbram
- First mentioned: 1379

Area
  - Total: 8.76 km^{2} (3.38 sq mi)
- Elevation: 491 m (1,611 ft)

Population (2026-01-01)
  - Total: 266
  - Density: 30.4/km^{2} (78.6/sq mi)
- Time zone: UTC+1 (CET)
  - Summer (DST): UTC+2 (CEST)
- Postal code: 262 72
- Website: www.hudcice.cz

Hudčice is a municipality and village in Příbram District in the Central Bohemian Region of the Czech Republic. It has about 300 inhabitants.

== Administrative division ==
Hudčice consists of two municipal parts (in brackets population according to the 2021 census):

- Hudčice (213)
- Slavětín (18)

== Demographics ==
Historical population
Year	Pop.	±%
1869	591	—
1880	539	−8.8%
1890	501	−7.1%
1900	494	−1.4%
1910	547	+10.7%
1921	497	−9.1%
1930	569	+14.5%
1950	417	−26.7%
1961	407	−2.4%
1970	373	−8.4%
1980	305	−18.2%
1991	293	−3.9%
2001	237	−19.1%
2011	257	+8.4%
2021	231	−10.1%
Source: Censuses
