= Drahlín =

- Municipality
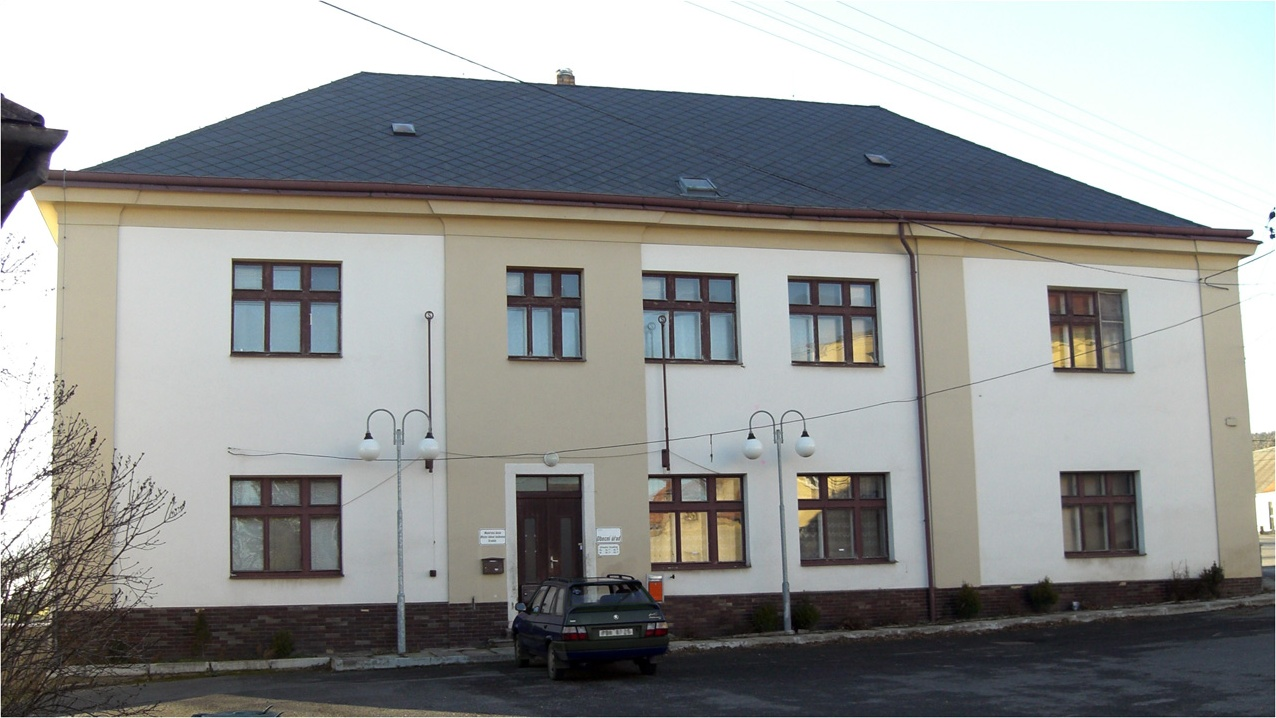
- Municipal office

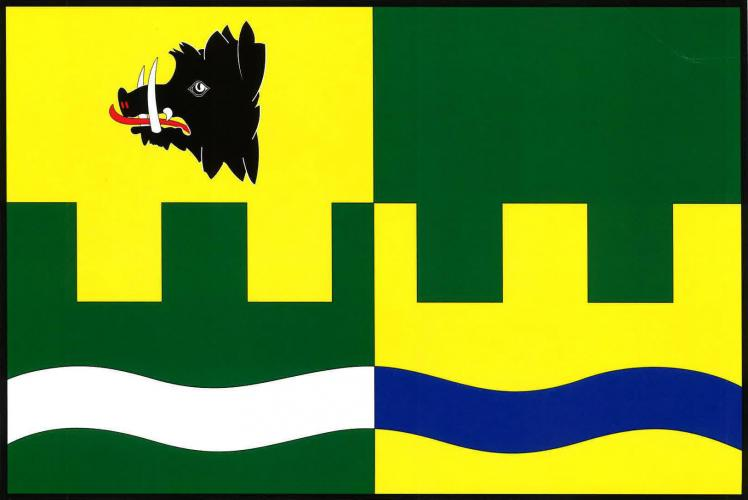
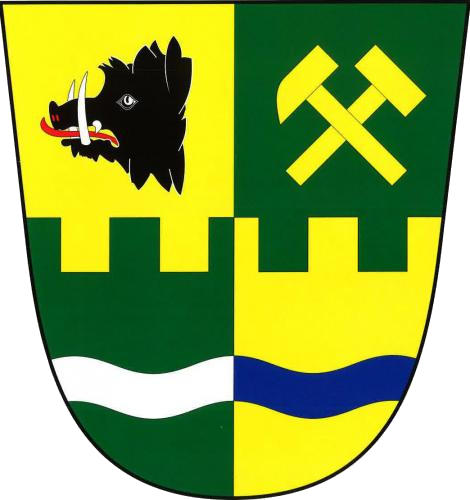
- Flag Coat of arms

- Location in the Czech Republic
- Coordinates: 49°43′56″N 13°58′8″E
- Country: Czech Republic
- Region: Central Bohemian
- District: Příbram
- First mentioned: 1324

Area
  - Total: 5.89 km^{2} (2.27 sq mi)
- Elevation: 522 m (1,713 ft)

Population (2026-01-01)
  - Total: 578
  - Density: 98.1/km^{2} (254/sq mi)
- Time zone: UTC+1 (CET)
  - Summer (DST): UTC+2 (CEST)
- Postal code: 261 01
- Website: www.drahlin.cz

Drahlín is a municipality and village in Příbram District in the Central Bohemian Region of the Czech Republic. It has about 600 inhabitants.

== Demographics ==
Historical population
| Year | Pop. | ±% |
|---|---|---|
| 1869 | 752 | — |
| 1880 | 779 | +3.6% |
| 1890 | 861 | +10.5% |
| 1900 | 884 | +2.7% |
| 1910 | 853 | −3.5% |
| 1921 | 734 | −14.0% |
| 1930 | 719 | −2.0% |
| 1950 | 507 | −29.5% |
| 1961 | 480 | −5.3% |
| 1970 | 470 | −2.1% |
| 1980 | 420 | −10.6% |
| 1991 | 459 | +9.3% |
| 2001 | 500 | +8.9% |
| 2011 | 535 | +7.0% |
| 2021 | 549 | +2.6% |
Source: Censuses
