= Nestrašovice =

- Municipality
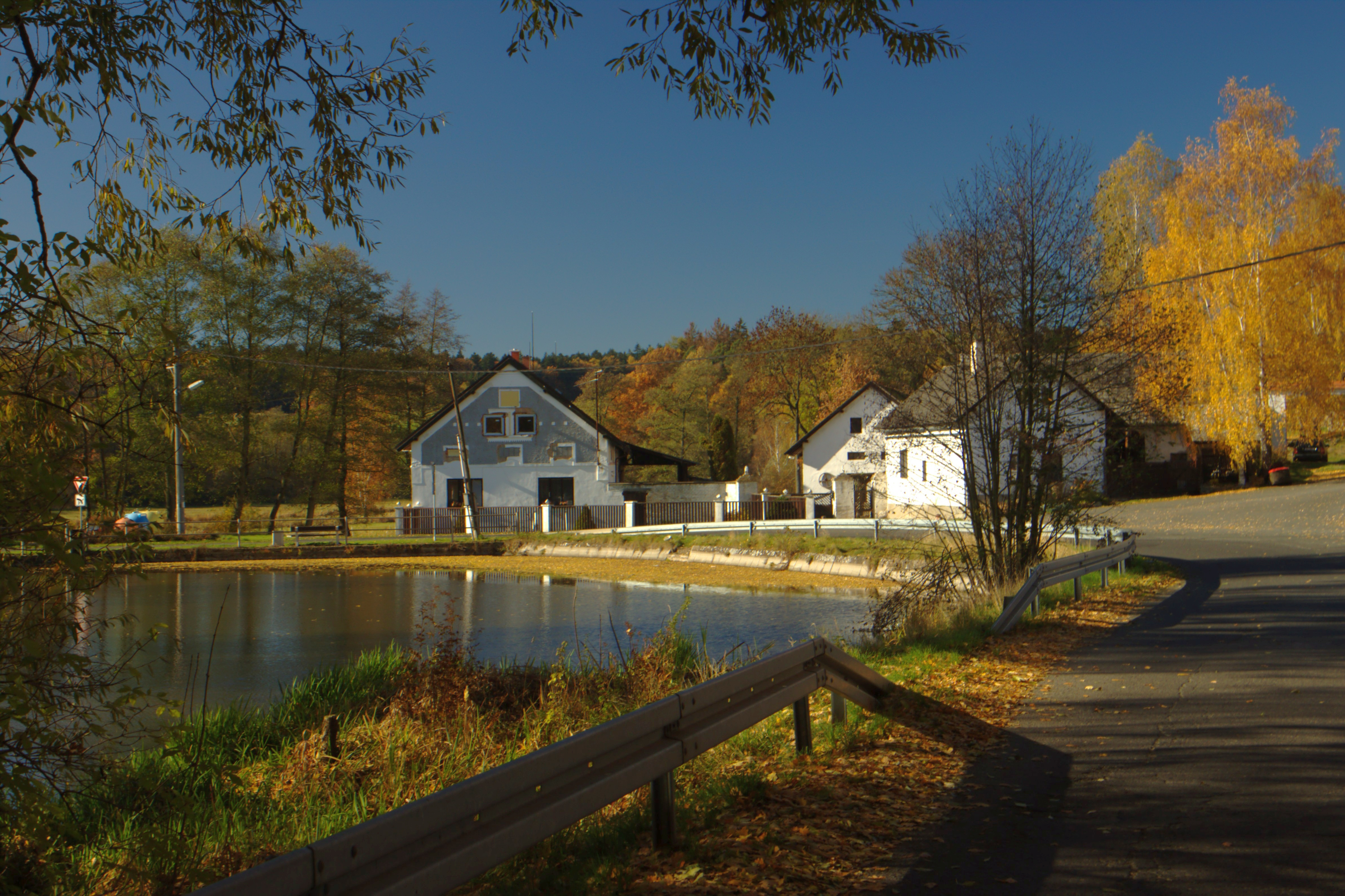
- A pond in the centre of Nestrašovice

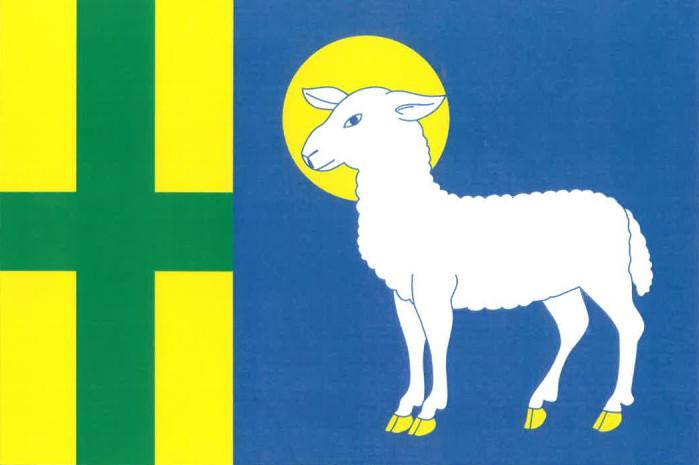
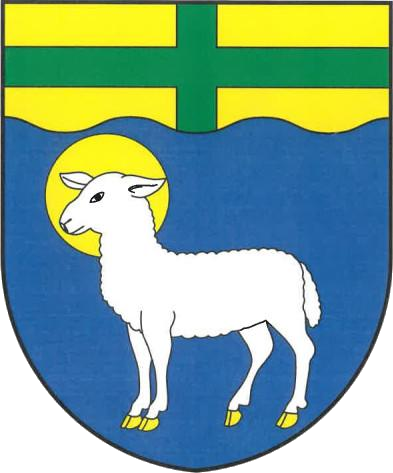
- Flag Coat of arms

- Location in the Czech Republic
- Coordinates: 49°33′38″N 14°1′34″E
- Country: Czech Republic
- Region: Central Bohemian
- District: Příbram
- First mentioned: 1359

Area
  - Total: 2.96 km^{2} (1.14 sq mi)
- Elevation: 455 m (1,493 ft)

Population (2026-01-01)
  - Total: 56
  - Density: 19/km^{2} (49/sq mi)
- Time zone: UTC+1 (CET)
  - Summer (DST): UTC+2 (CEST)
- Postal code: 262 72
- Website: www.nestrasovice.cz

Nestrašovice is a municipality and village in Příbram District in the Central Bohemian Region of the Czech Republic. It has about 60 inhabitants.

== Demographics ==
Historical population
Year	Pop.	±%
1869	217	—
1880	212	−2.3%
1890	184	−13.2%
1900	187	+1.6%
1910	196	+4.8%
1921	209	+6.6%
1930	180	−13.9%
1950	145	−19.4%
1961	124	−14.5%
1970	99	−20.2%
1980	83	−16.2%
1991	66	−20.5%
2001	62	−6.1%
2011	66	+6.5%
2021	49	−25.8%
Source: Censuses
