= Smolotely =

- Municipality
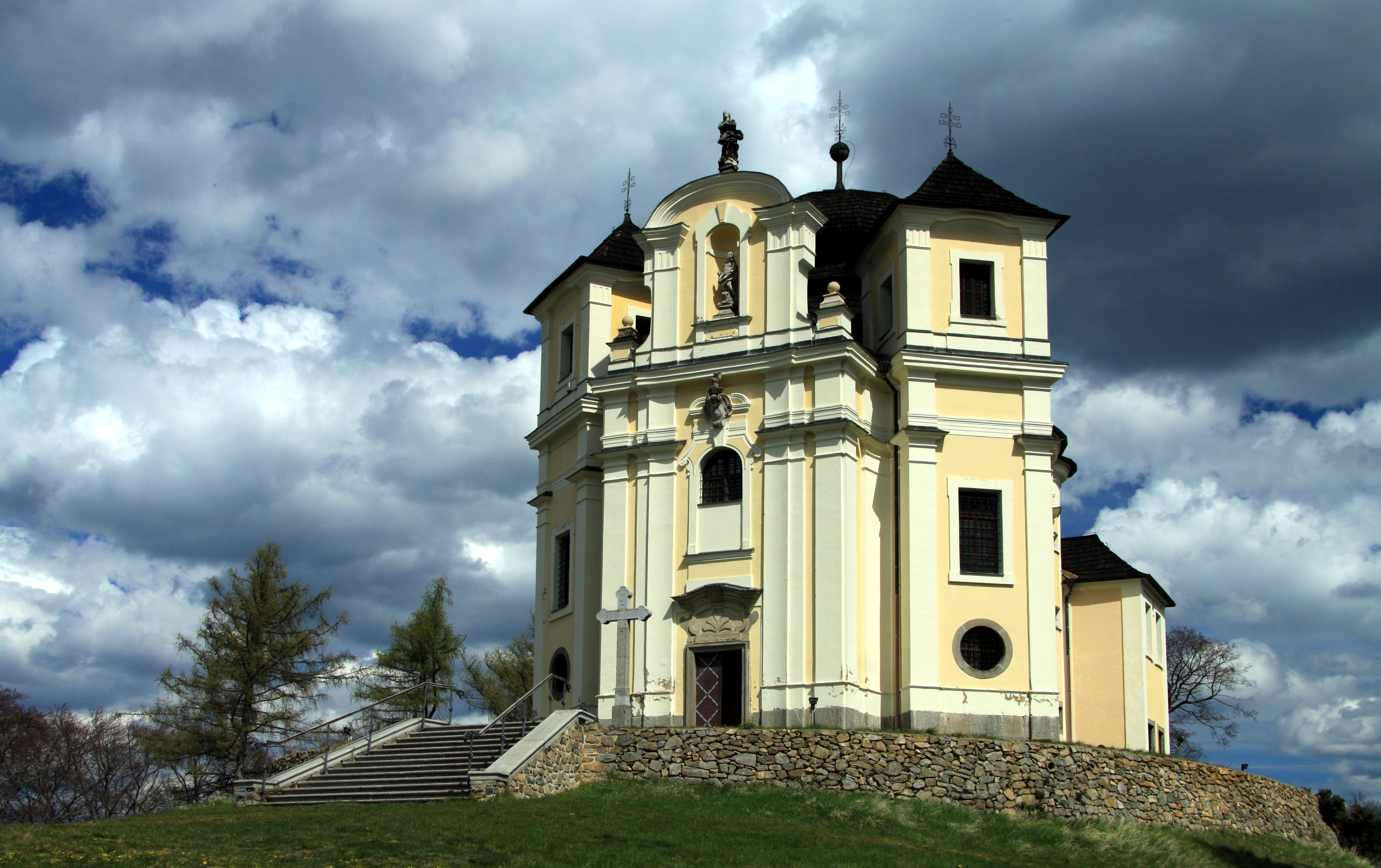
- Church of Saint John of Baptist and Our Lady of Mount Carmel

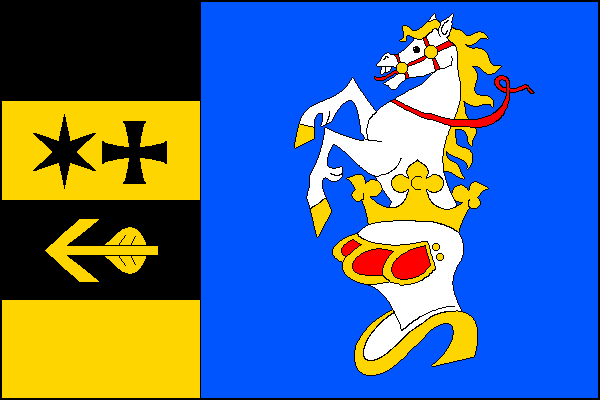
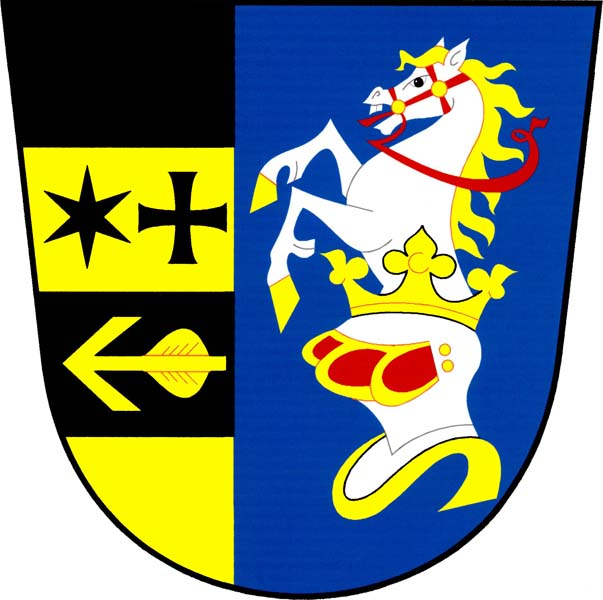
- Flag Coat of arms

- Location in the Czech Republic
- Coordinates: 49°37′14″N 14°8′8″E
- Country: Czech Republic
- Region: Central Bohemian
- District: Příbram
- First mentioned: 1336

Area
  - Total: 10.93 km^{2} (4.22 sq mi)
- Elevation: 439 m (1,440 ft)

Population (2026-01-01)
  - Total: 306
  - Density: 28.0/km^{2} (72.5/sq mi)
- Time zone: UTC+1 (CET)
  - Summer (DST): UTC+2 (CEST)
- Postal code: 262 63
- Website: smolotely.cz

Smolotely is a municipality and village in Příbram District in the Central Bohemian Region of the Czech Republic. It has about 300 inhabitants.

== Demographics ==
Historical population
| Year | Pop. | ±% |
|---|---|---|
| 1869 | 753 | — |
| 1880 | 698 | −7.3% |
| 1890 | 756 | +8.3% |
| 1900 | 662 | −12.4% |
| 1910 | 662 | +0.0% |
| 1921 | 632 | −4.5% |
| 1930 | 567 | −10.3% |
| 1950 | 391 | −31.0% |
| 1961 | 410 | +4.9% |
| 1970 | 330 | −19.5% |
| 1980 | 280 | −15.2% |
| 1991 | 243 | −13.2% |
| 2001 | 235 | −3.3% |
| 2011 | 229 | −2.6% |
| 2021 | 255 | +11.4% |
Source: Censuses
