= Narysov =

- Municipality
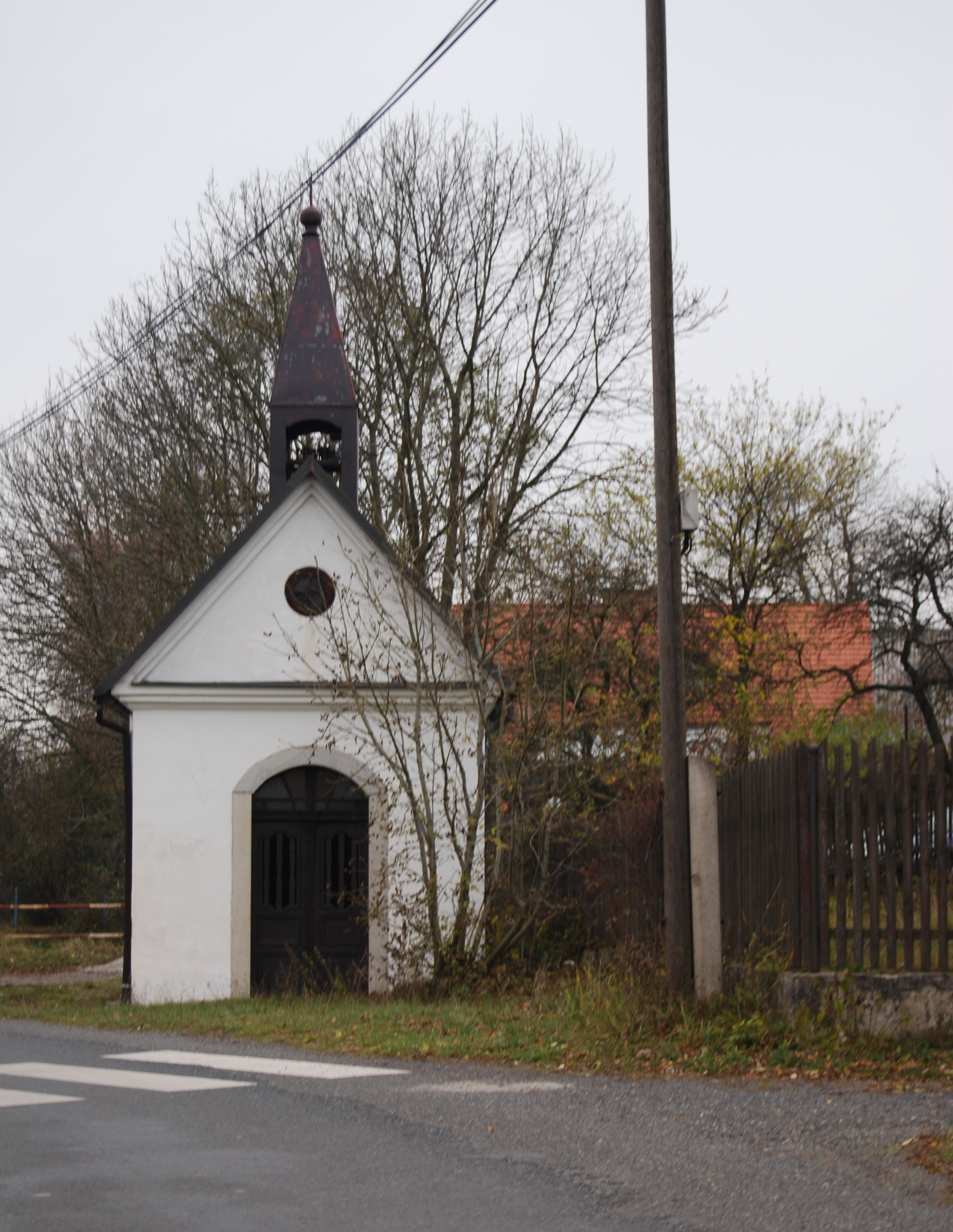
- Chapel in Narysov

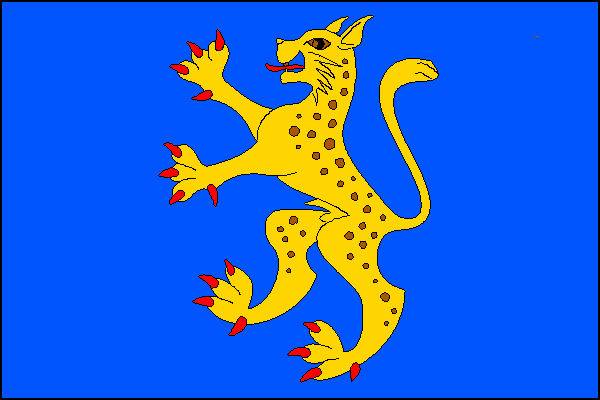
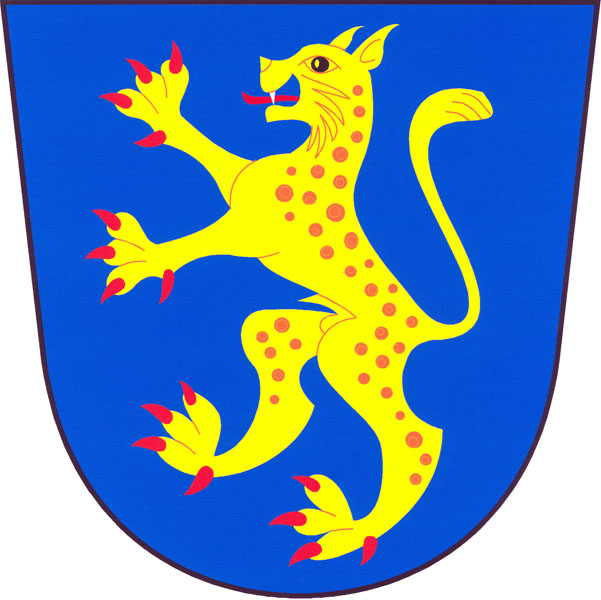
- Flag Coat of arms

- Location in the Czech Republic
- Coordinates: 49°38′27″N 13°58′15″E
- Country: Czech Republic
- Region: Central Bohemian
- District: Příbram
- First mentioned: 1379

Area
  - Total: 3.58 km^{2} (1.38 sq mi)
- Elevation: 596 m (1,955 ft)

Population (2026-01-01)
  - Total: 280
  - Density: 78/km^{2} (200/sq mi)
- Time zone: UTC+1 (CET)
  - Summer (DST): UTC+2 (CEST)
- Postal code: 261 01
- Website: www.narysov.cz

Narysov is a municipality and village in Příbram District in the Central Bohemian Region of the Czech Republic. It has about 300 inhabitants.

== Demographics ==
Historical population
Year	Pop.	±%
1869	255	—
1880	301	+18.0%
1890	317	+5.3%
1900	306	−3.5%
1910	308	+0.7%
1921	283	−8.1%
1930	241	−14.8%
1950	167	−30.7%
1961	169	+1.2%
1970	149	−11.8%
1980	153	+2.7%
1991	203	+32.7%
2001	218	+7.4%
2011	228	+4.6%
2021	270	+18.4%
Source: Censuses
