= Tušovice =

- Municipality
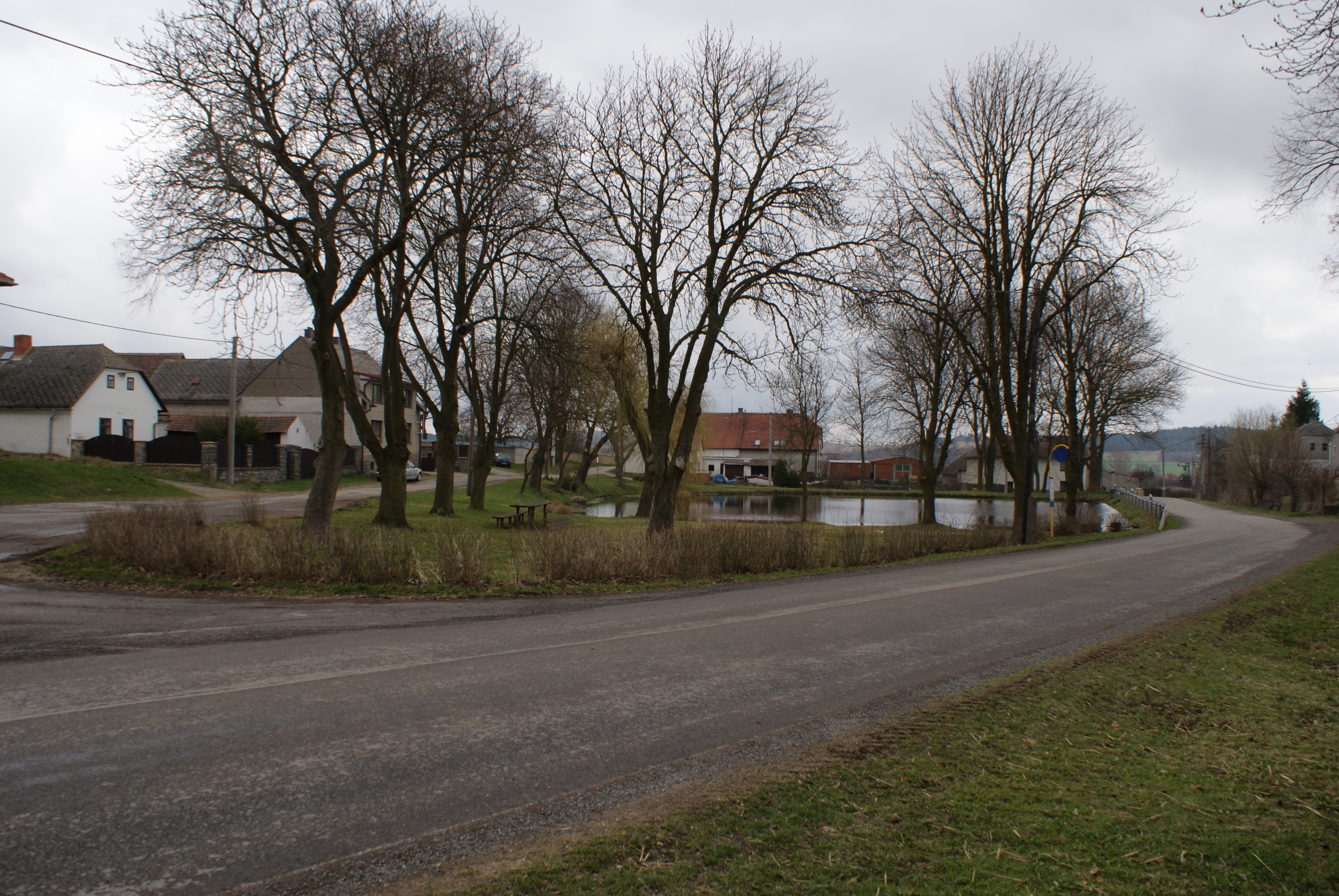
- Centre of Tušovice

- Location in the Czech Republic
- Coordinates: 49°34′32″N 14°1′50″E
- Country: Czech Republic
- Region: Central Bohemian
- District: Příbram
- First mentioned: 1359

Area
  - Total: 3.35 km^{2} (1.29 sq mi)
- Elevation: 498 m (1,634 ft)

Population (2026-01-01)
  - Total: 102
  - Density: 30.4/km^{2} (78.9/sq mi)
- Time zone: UTC+1 (CET)
  - Summer (DST): UTC+2 (CEST)
- Postal code: 262 72
- Website: www.tusovice.cz

Tušovice is a municipality and village in Příbram District in the Central Bohemian Region of the Czech Republic. It has about 100 inhabitants.

== Demographics ==
Historical population
Year	Pop.	±%
1869	221	—
1880	229	+3.6%
1890	247	+7.9%
1900	242	−2.0%
1910	213	−12.0%
1921	191	−10.3%
1930	156	−18.3%
1950	138	−11.5%
1961	127	−8.0%
1970	115	−9.4%
1980	115	+0.0%
1991	95	−17.4%
2001	104	+9.5%
2011	91	−12.5%
2021	110	+20.9%
Source: Censuses
