= Modřovice =

- Municipality
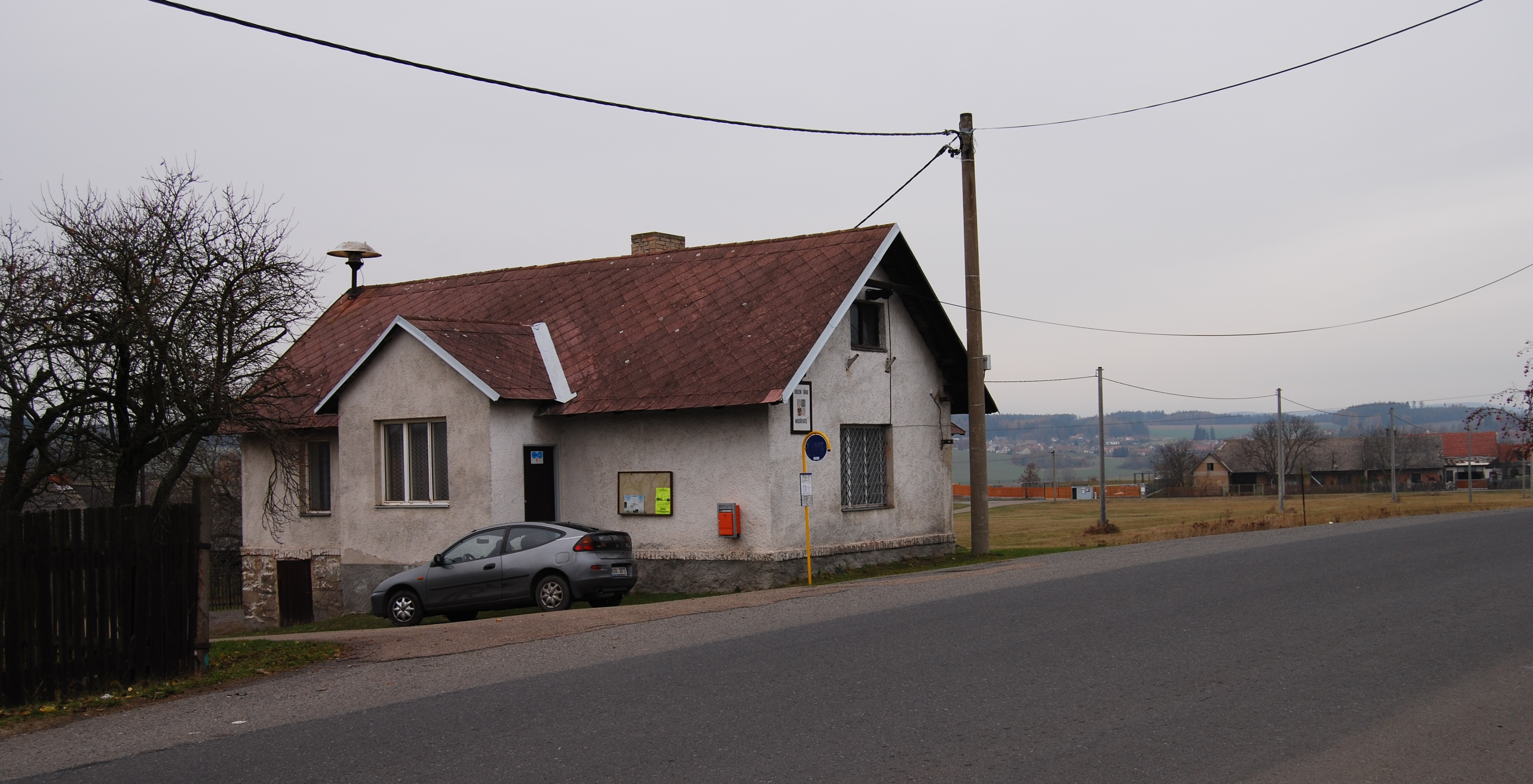
- Municipal office

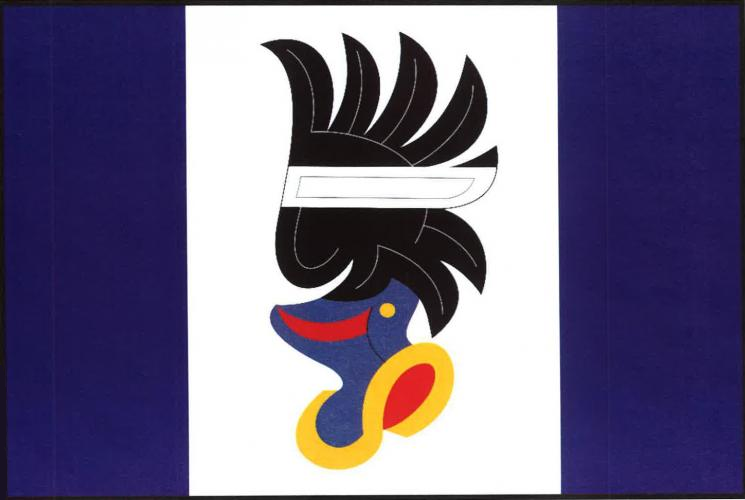
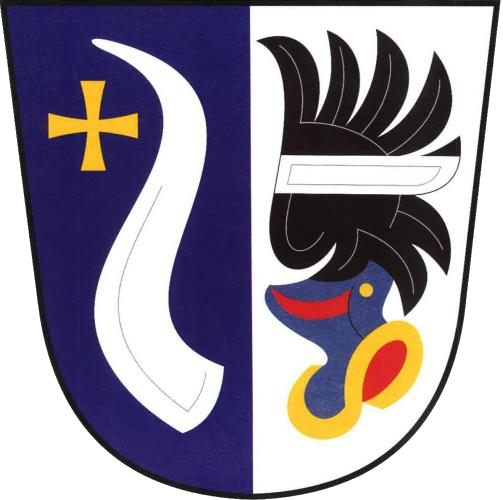
- Flag Coat of arms

- Location in the Czech Republic
- Coordinates: 49°37′3″N 13°57′23″E
- Country: Czech Republic
- Region: Central Bohemian
- District: Příbram
- First mentioned: 1367

Area
  - Total: 3.19 km^{2} (1.23 sq mi)
- Elevation: 555 m (1,821 ft)

Population (2026-01-01)
  - Total: 104
  - Density: 32.6/km^{2} (84.4/sq mi)
- Time zone: UTC+1 (CET)
  - Summer (DST): UTC+2 (CEST)
- Postal code: 262 42
- Website: obecmodrovice.cz

Modřovice is a municipality and village in Příbram District in the Central Bohemian Region of the Czech Republic. It has about 100 inhabitants.

== Demographics ==
Historical population
Year	Pop.	±%
1869	203	—
1880	228	+12.3%
1890	241	+5.7%
1900	219	−9.1%
1910	187	−14.6%
1921	196	+4.8%
1930	174	−11.2%
1950	107	−38.5%
1961	123	+15.0%
1970	105	−14.6%
1980	82	−21.9%
1991	73	−11.0%
2001	58	−20.5%
2011	72	+24.1%
2021	99	+37.5%
Source: Censuses
