= Občov =

- Municipality
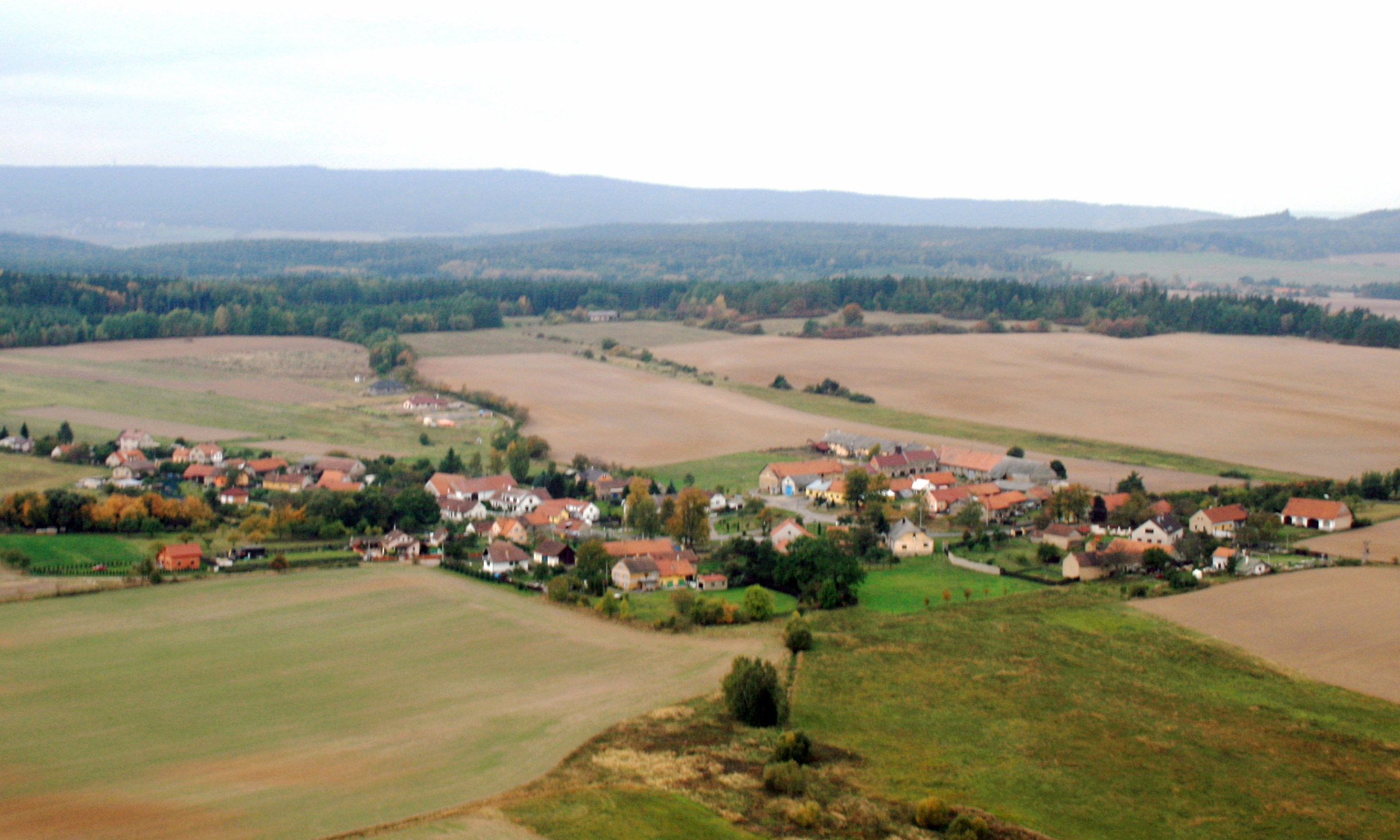
- Aerial view

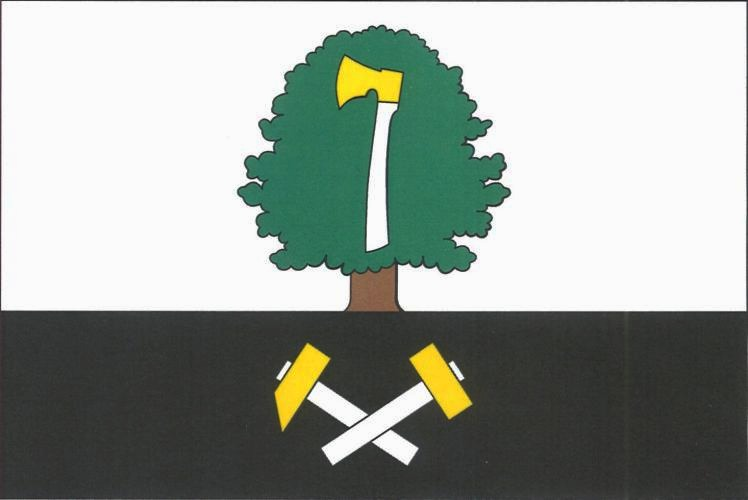
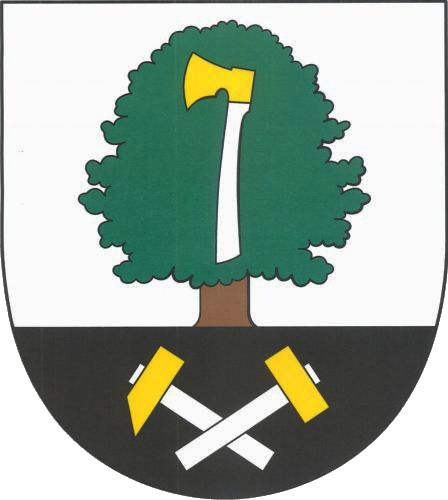
- Flag Coat of arms

- Location in the Czech Republic
- Coordinates: 49°42′47″N 14°4′0″E
- Country: Czech Republic
- Region: Central Bohemian
- District: Příbram
- First mentioned: 1357

Area
  - Total: 2.91 km^{2} (1.12 sq mi)
- Elevation: 478 m (1,568 ft)

Population (2026-01-01)
  - Total: 208
  - Density: 71.5/km^{2} (185/sq mi)
- Time zone: UTC+1 (CET)
  - Summer (DST): UTC+2 (CEST)
- Postal code: 261 01
- Website: www.obecobcov.cz

Občov is a municipality and village in Příbram District in the Central Bohemian Region of the Czech Republic. It has about 200 inhabitants.

== Demographics ==
Historical population
Year	Pop.	±%
1869	212	—
1880	239	+12.7%
1890	245	+2.5%
1900	213	−13.1%
1910	179	−16.0%
1921	164	−8.4%
1930	178	+8.5%
1950	127	−28.7%
1961	107	−15.7%
1970	97	−9.3%
1980	106	+9.3%
1991	100	−5.7%
2001	92	−8.0%
2011	126	+37.0%
2021	193	+53.2%
Source: Censuses
