= Sádek (Příbram District) =

- Municipality
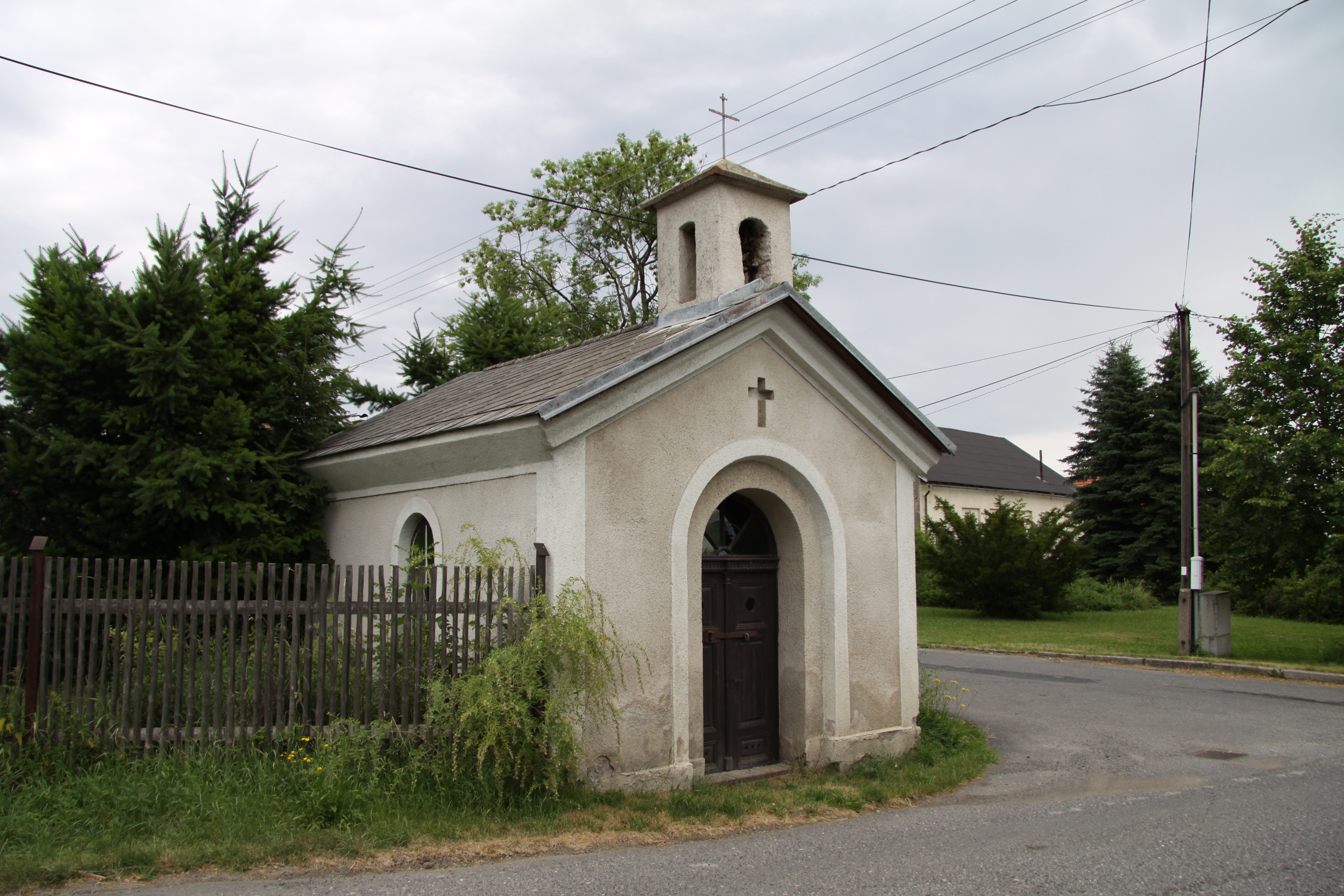
- Chapel in Sádek

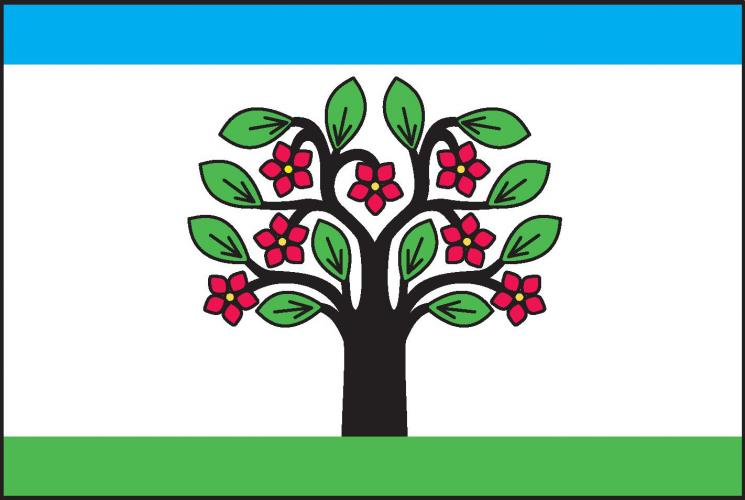
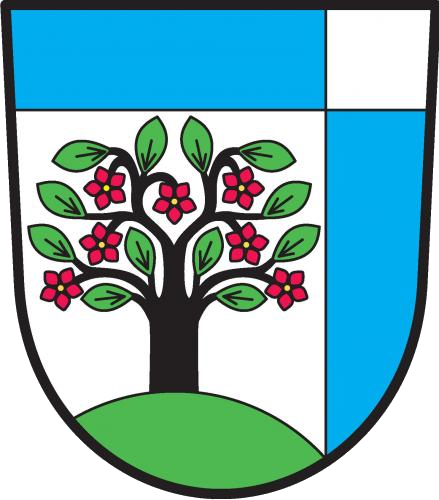
- Flag Coat of arms

- Location in the Czech Republic
- Coordinates: 49°44′0″N 13°58′59″E
- Country: Czech Republic
- Region: Central Bohemian
- District: Příbram
- First mentioned: 1390

Area
  - Total: 4.21 km^{2} (1.63 sq mi)
- Elevation: 483 m (1,585 ft)

Population (2026-01-01)
  - Total: 246
  - Density: 58.4/km^{2} (151/sq mi)
- Time zone: UTC+1 (CET)
  - Summer (DST): UTC+2 (CEST)
- Postal code: 261 01
- Website: www.obec-sadek.cz

Sádek is a municipality and village in Příbram District in the Central Bohemian Region of the Czech Republic. It has about 200 inhabitants.

== Demographics ==
Historical population
Year	Pop.	±%
1869	315	—
1880	374	+18.7%
1890	426	+13.9%
1900	452	+6.1%
1910	441	−2.4%
1921	381	−13.6%
1930	347	−8.9%
1950	267	−23.1%
1961	238	−10.9%
1970	202	−15.1%
1980	189	−6.4%
1991	185	−2.1%
2001	227	+22.7%
2011	221	−2.6%
2021	218	−1.4%
Source: Censuses
