= Těchařovice =

- Municipality
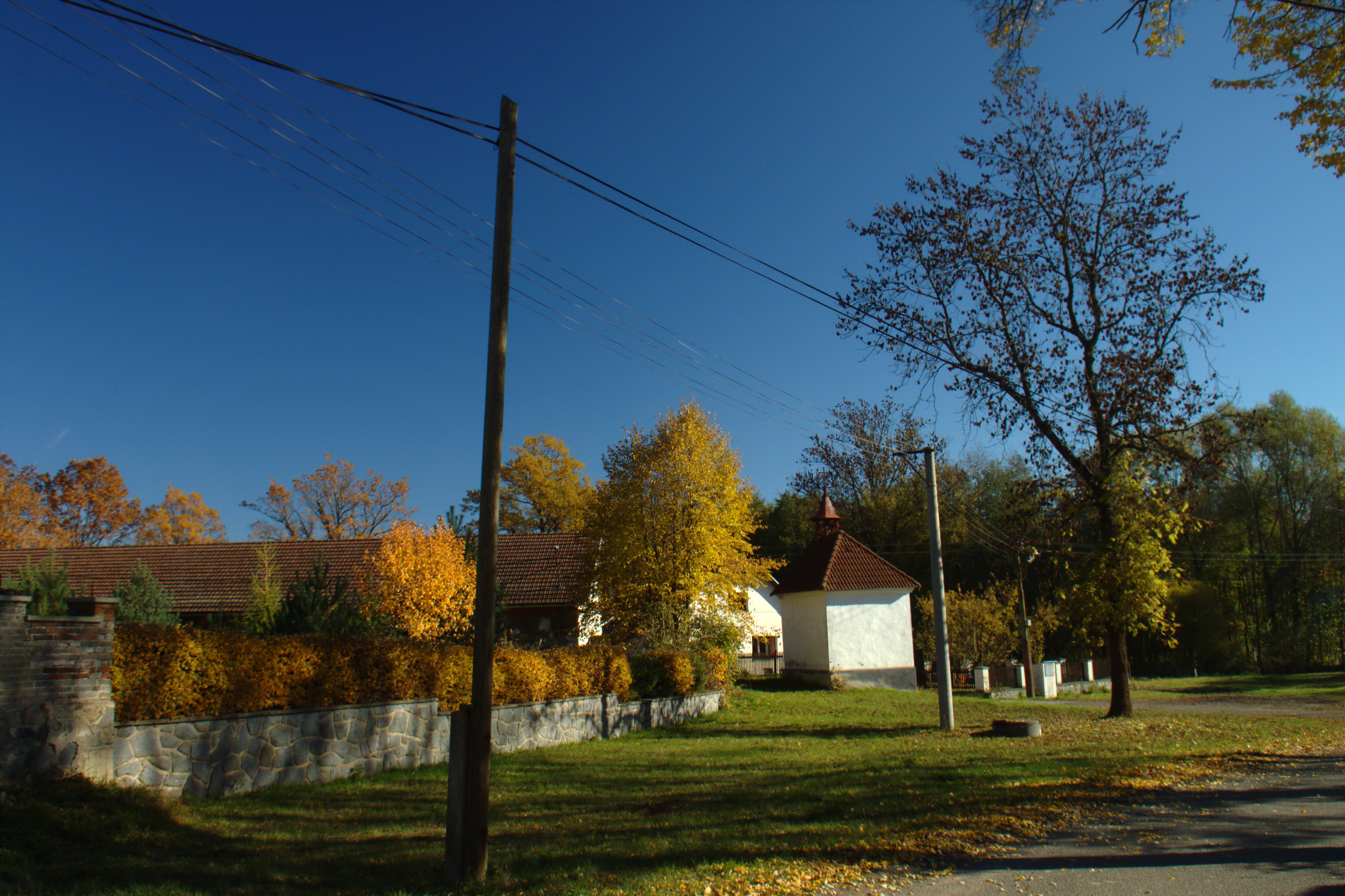
- Centre of Těchařovice

- Location in the Czech Republic
- Coordinates: 49°35′58″N 14°2′56″E
- Country: Czech Republic
- Region: Central Bohemian
- District: Příbram
- First mentioned: 1356

Area
  - Total: 4.46 km^{2} (1.72 sq mi)
- Elevation: 519 m (1,703 ft)

Population (2026-01-01)
  - Total: 37
  - Density: 8.3/km^{2} (21/sq mi)
- Time zone: UTC+1 (CET)
  - Summer (DST): UTC+2 (CEST)
- Postal code: 262 31
- Website: www.obectecharovice.cz

Těchařovice is a municipality and village in Příbram District in the Central Bohemian Region of the Czech Republic. It has about 40 inhabitants.

== Demographics ==
Historical population
Year	Pop.	±%
1869	179	—
1880	180	+0.6%
1890	173	−3.9%
1900	156	−9.8%
1910	147	−5.8%
1921	142	−3.4%
1930	117	−17.6%
1950	79	−32.5%
1961	91	+15.2%
1970	83	−8.8%
1980	77	−7.2%
1991	56	−27.3%
2001	34	−39.3%
2011	31	−8.8%
2021	51	+64.5%
Source: Censuses
