= Koupě =

- Municipality
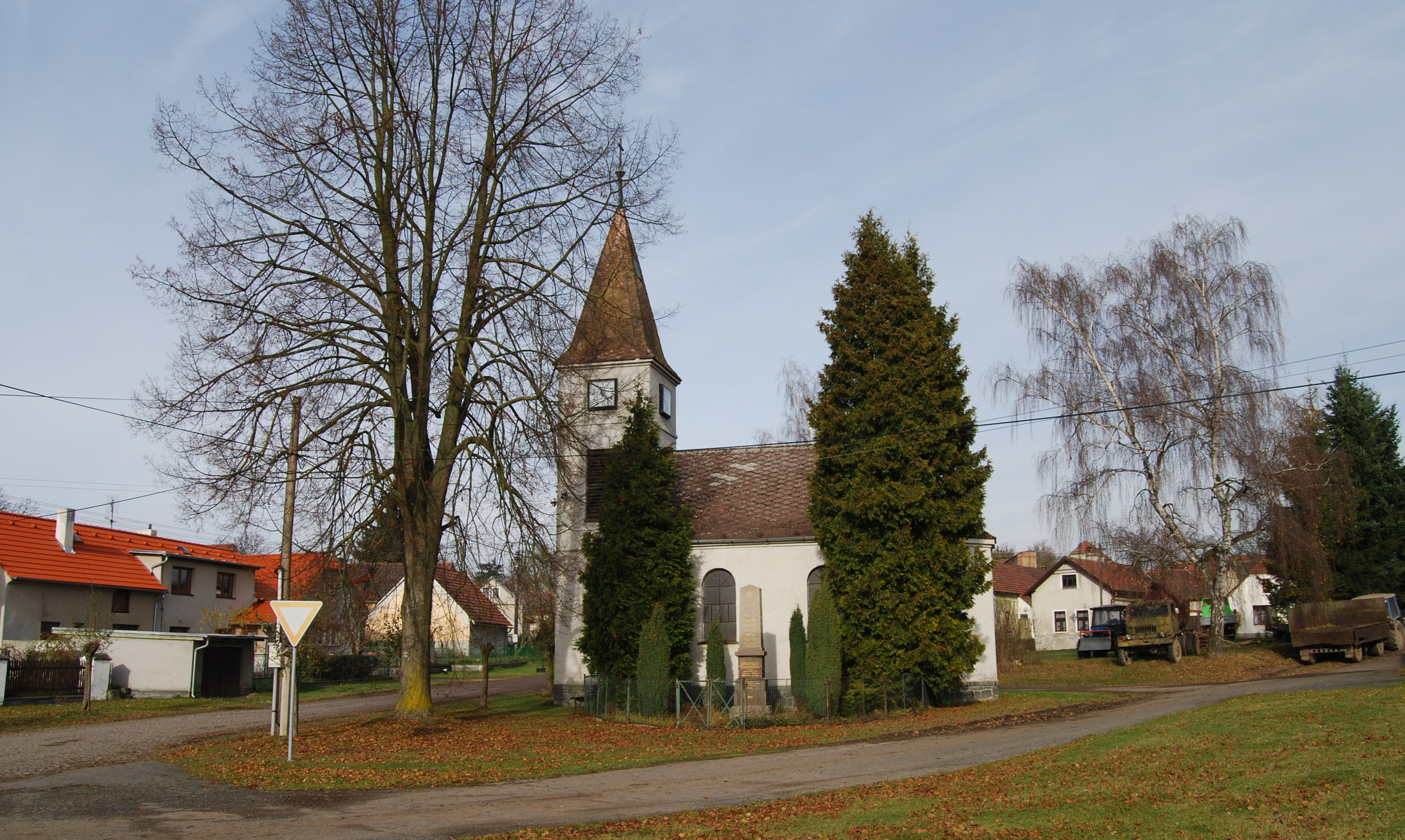
- Chapel in the centre of Koupě

- Location in the Czech Republic
- Coordinates: 49°30′54″N 13°55′6″E
- Country: Czech Republic
- Region: Central Bohemian
- District: Příbram
- First mentioned: 1367

Area
  - Total: 7.37 km^{2} (2.85 sq mi)
- Elevation: 524 m (1,719 ft)

Population (2026-01-01)
  - Total: 115
  - Density: 15.6/km^{2} (40.4/sq mi)
- Time zone: UTC+1 (CET)
  - Summer (DST): UTC+2 (CEST)
- Postal code: 262 72
- Website: www.obec-koupe.cz

Koupě is a municipality and village in Příbram District in the Central Bohemian Region of the Czech Republic. It has about 100 inhabitants.

== Demographics ==
Historical population
Year	Pop.	±%
1869	442	—
1880	430	−2.7%
1890	410	−4.7%
1900	426	+3.9%
1910	446	+4.7%
1921	426	−4.5%
1930	400	−6.1%
1950	296	−26.0%
1961	263	−11.1%
1970	230	−12.5%
1980	196	−14.8%
1991	180	−8.2%
2001	163	−9.4%
2011	140	−14.1%
2021	122	−12.9%
Source: Censuses
