= Horčápsko =

- Municipality
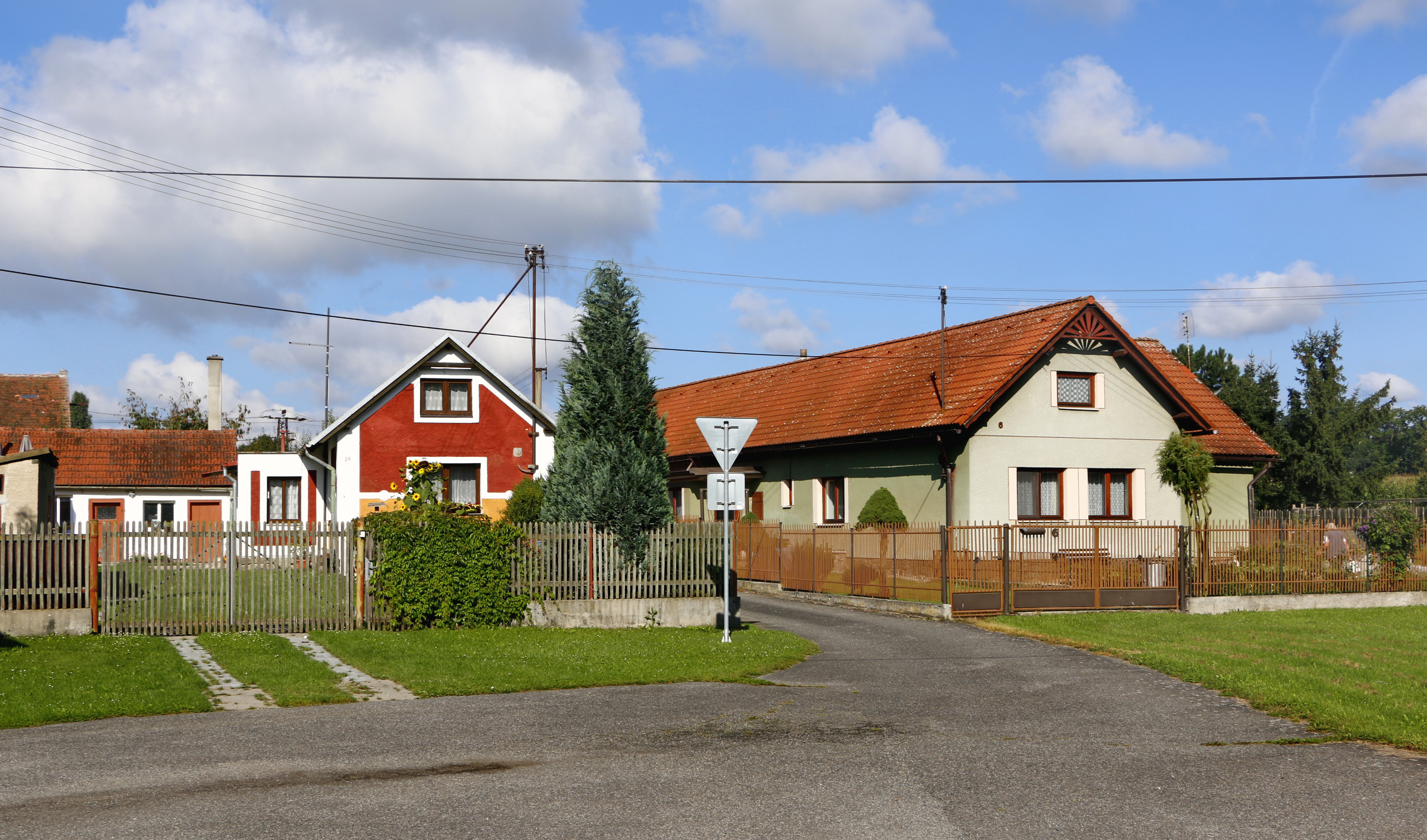
- Centre of Horčápsko

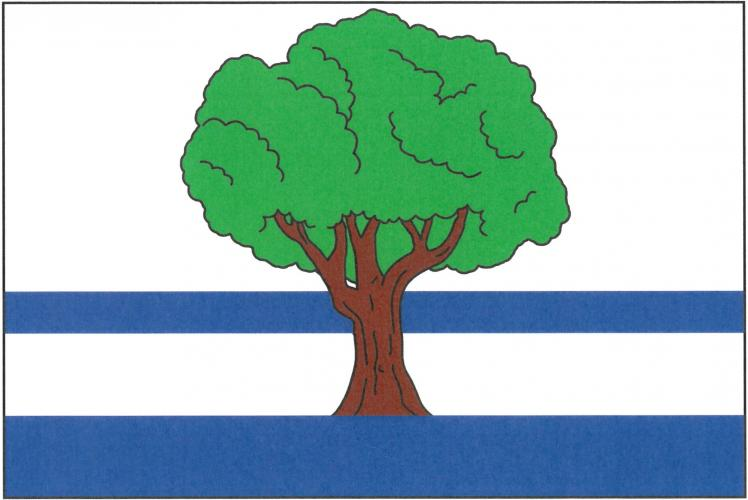
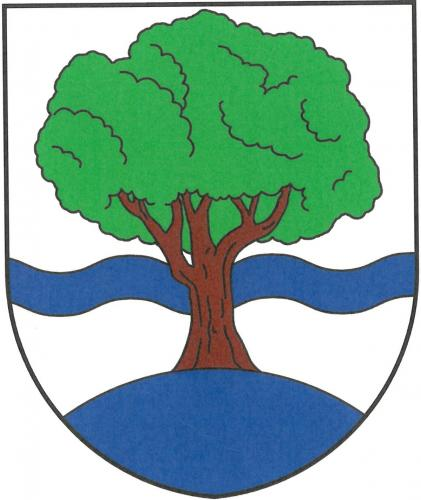
- Flag Coat of arms

- Location in the Czech Republic
- Coordinates: 49°35′4″N 13°59′4″E
- Country: Czech Republic
- Region: Central Bohemian
- District: Příbram
- First mentioned: 1313

Area
  - Total: 4.13 km^{2} (1.59 sq mi)
- Elevation: 476 m (1,562 ft)

Population (2026-01-01)
  - Total: 86
  - Density: 21/km^{2} (54/sq mi)
- Time zone: UTC+1 (CET)
  - Summer (DST): UTC+2 (CEST)
- Postal code: 262 72
- Website: www.horcapsko.cz

Horčápsko is a municipality and village in Příbram District in the Central Bohemian Region of the Czech Republic. It has about 90 inhabitants.

== Administrative division ==
Horčápsko consists of two municipal parts (in brackets population according to the 2021 census):

- Horčápsko (50)
- Stará Voda (21)

== Demographics ==
Historical population
Year	Pop.	±%
1869	246	—
1880	293	+19.1%
1890	296	+1.0%
1900	279	−5.7%
1910	232	−16.8%
1921	221	−4.7%
1930	218	−1.4%
1950	164	−24.8%
1961	158	−3.7%
1970	140	−11.4%
1980	115	−17.9%
1991	103	−10.4%
2001	98	−4.9%
2011	85	−13.3%
2021	71	−16.5%
Source: Censuses
