= Vševily =

- Municipality
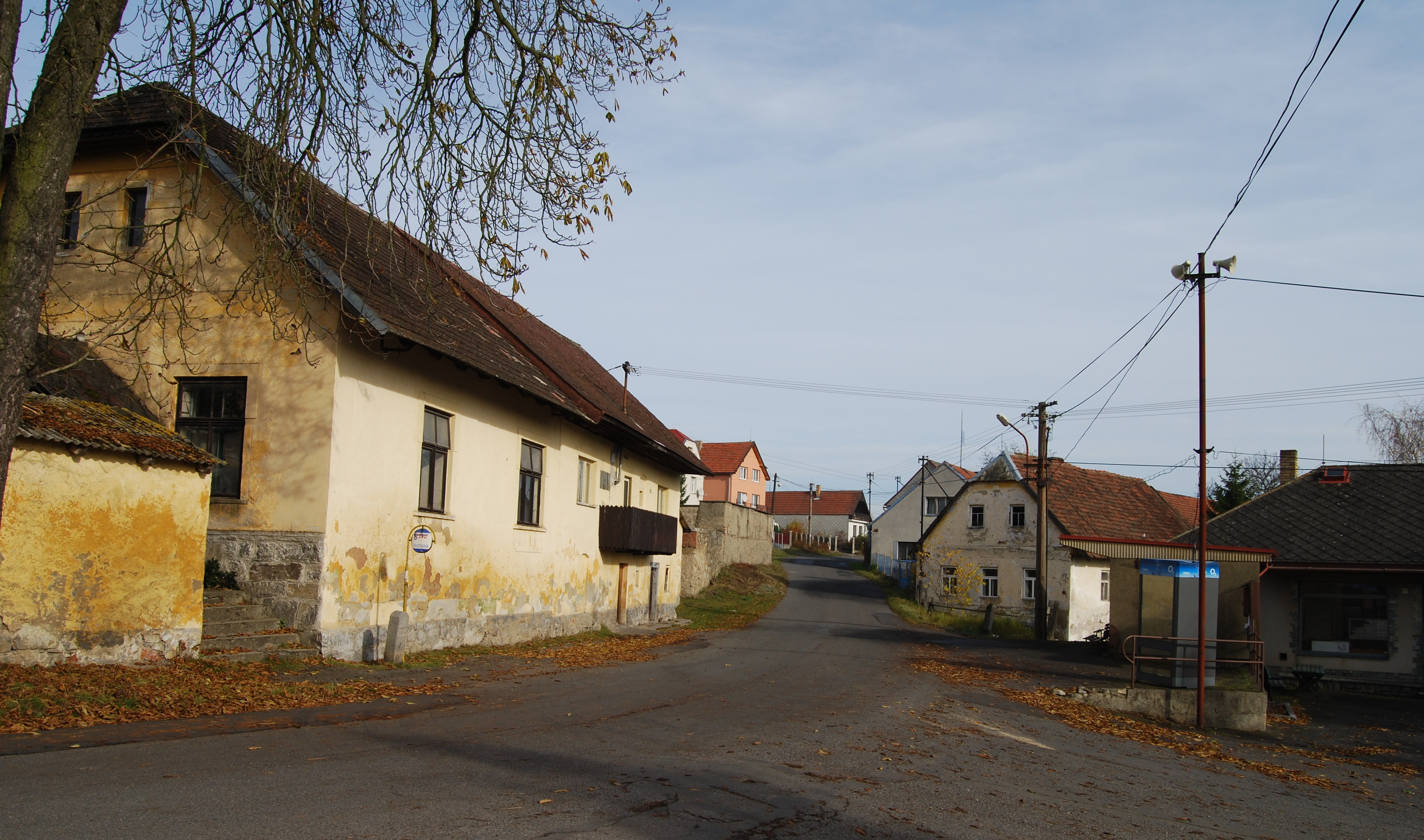
- A street in Vševily

- Location in the Czech Republic
- Coordinates: 49°33′55″N 13°52′57″E
- Country: Czech Republic
- Region: Central Bohemian
- District: Příbram
- First mentioned: 1349

Area
  - Total: 5.83 km^{2} (2.25 sq mi)
- Elevation: 581 m (1,906 ft)

Population (2026-01-01)
  - Total: 140
  - Density: 24/km^{2} (62/sq mi)
- Time zone: UTC+1 (CET)
  - Summer (DST): UTC+2 (CEST)
- Postal code: 262 72
- Website: www.obec-vsevily.cz

Vševily is a municipality and village in Příbram District in the Central Bohemian Region of the Czech Republic. It has about 100 inhabitants.

== Demographics ==
Historical population
| Year | Pop. | ±% |
|---|---|---|
| 1869 | 445 | — |
| 1880 | 373 | −16.2% |
| 1890 | 317 | −15.0% |
| 1900 | 297 | −6.3% |
| 1910 | 343 | +15.5% |
| 1921 | 304 | −11.4% |
| 1930 | 326 | +7.2% |
| 1950 | 247 | −24.2% |
| 1961 | 216 | −12.6% |
| 1970 | 199 | −7.9% |
| 1980 | 152 | −23.6% |
| 1991 | 110 | −27.6% |
| 2001 | 127 | +15.5% |
| 2011 | 119 | −6.3% |
| 2021 | 133 | +11.8% |
Source: Censuses
