= Ostrov (Příbram District) =

- Municipality
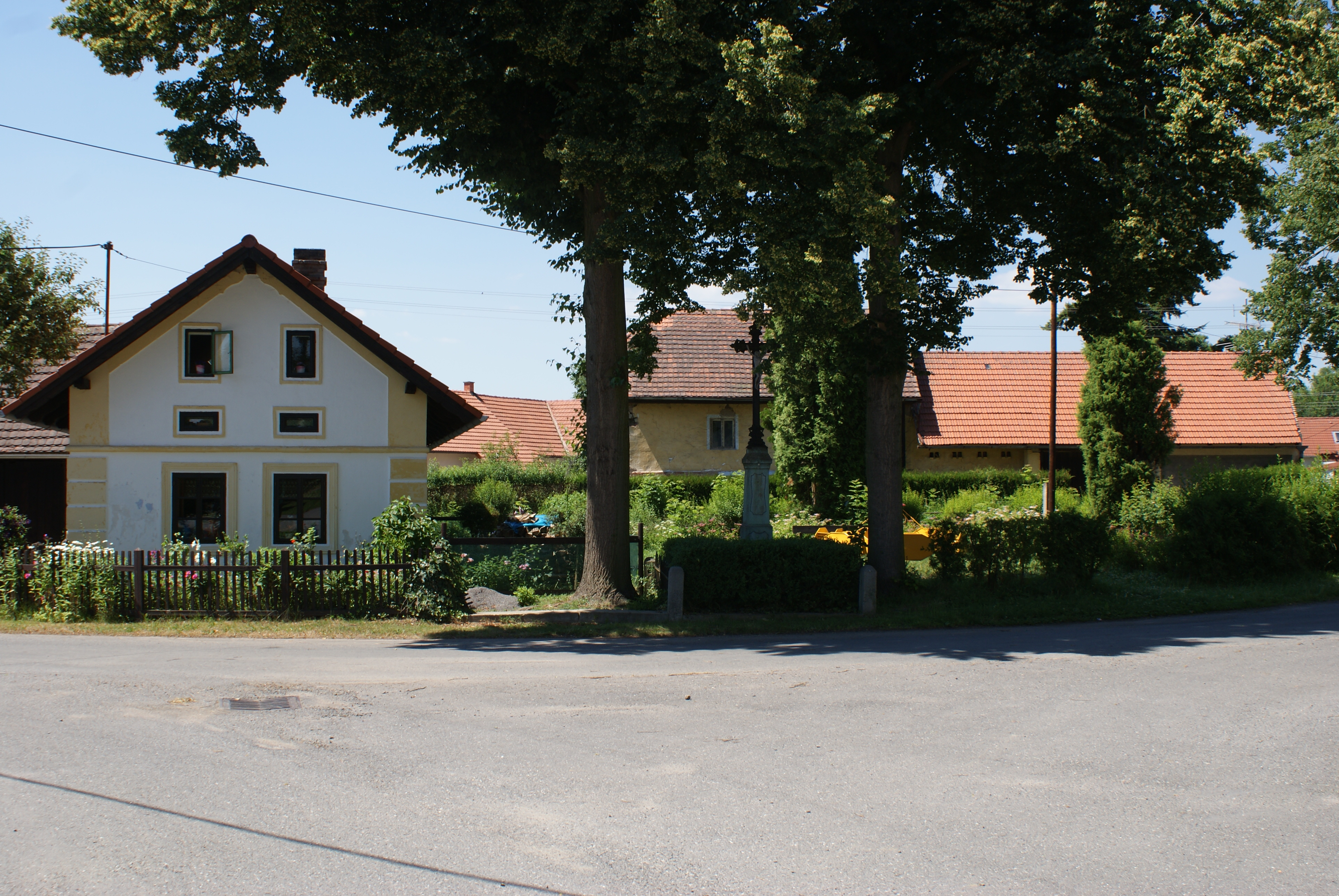
- Centre of Ostrov

- Location in the Czech Republic
- Coordinates: 49°36′40″N 14°0′52″E
- Country: Czech Republic
- Region: Central Bohemian
- District: Příbram
- First mentioned: 1333

Area
  - Total: 2.80 km^{2} (1.08 sq mi)
- Elevation: 498 m (1,634 ft)

Population (2026-01-01)
  - Total: 158
  - Density: 56.4/km^{2} (146/sq mi)
- Time zone: UTC+1 (CET)
  - Summer (DST): UTC+2 (CEST)
- Postal code: 262 72
- Website: www.ostrov-pb.cz

Ostrov is a municipality and village in Příbram District in the Central Bohemian Region of the Czech Republic. It has about 200 inhabitants.

== Demographics ==
Historical population
Year	Pop.	±%
1869	300	—
1880	299	−0.3%
1890	312	+4.3%
1900	274	−12.2%
1910	261	−4.7%
1921	255	−2.3%
1930	215	−15.7%
1950	174	−19.1%
1961	146	−16.1%
1970	118	−19.2%
1980	101	−14.4%
1991	85	−15.8%
2001	89	+4.7%
2011	105	+18.0%
2021	141	+34.3%
Source: Censuses
