= Lazsko =

- Municipality
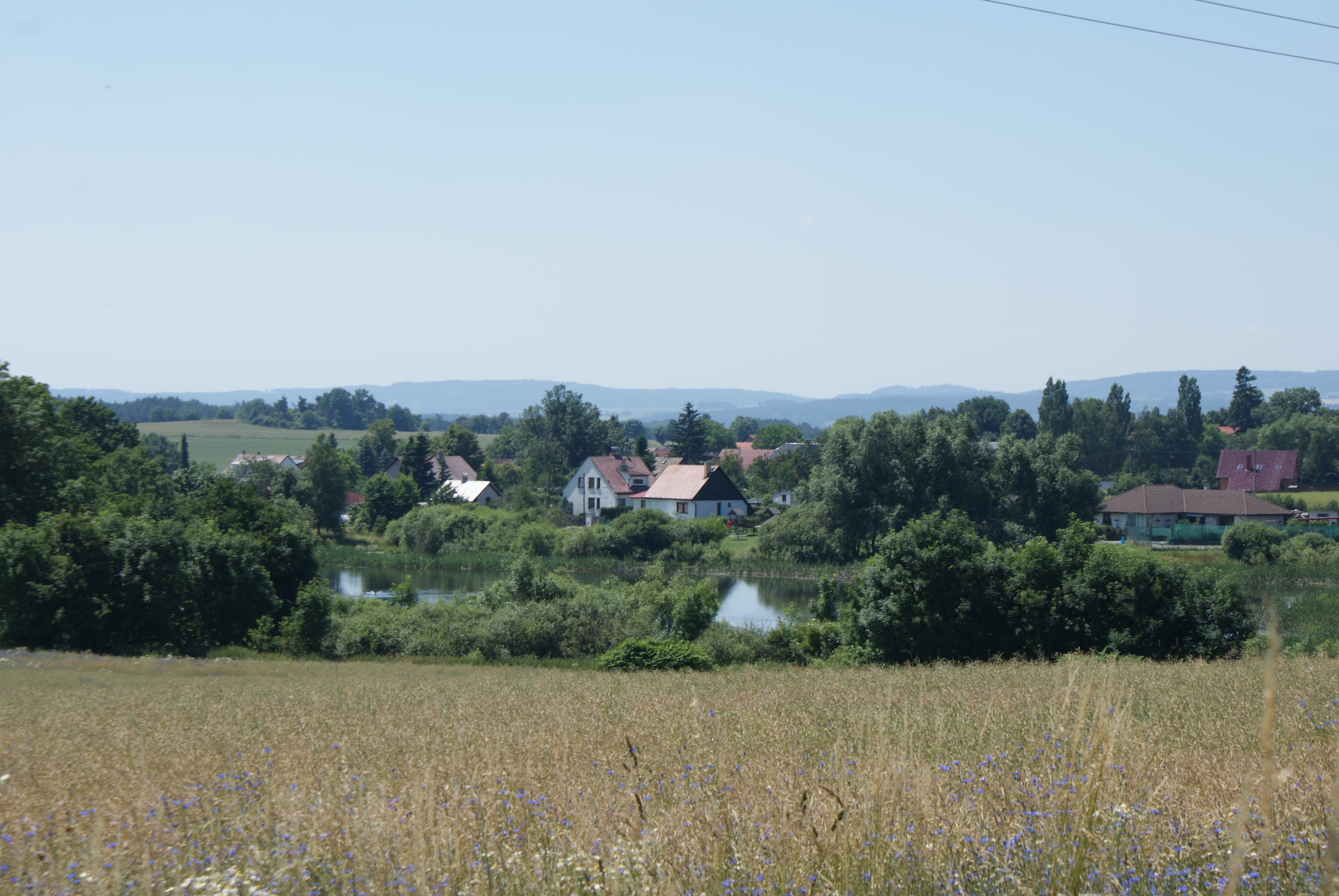
- General view

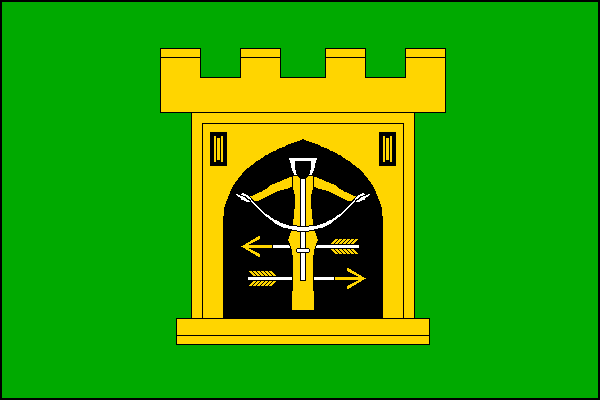
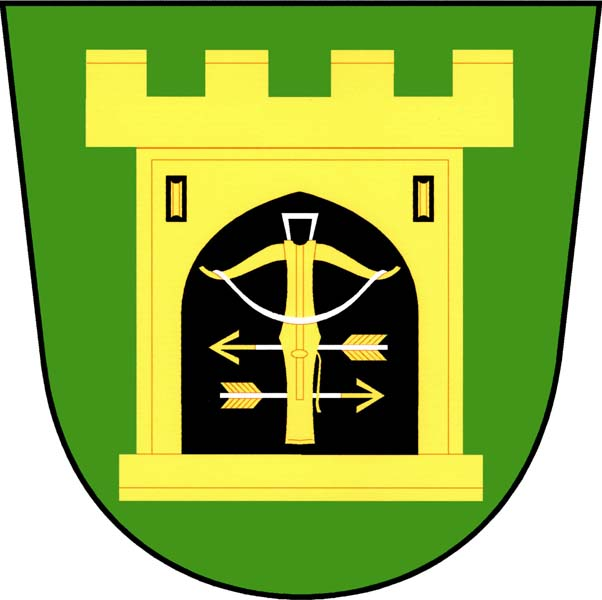
- Flag Coat of arms

- Location in the Czech Republic
- Coordinates: 49°37′25″N 14°0′14″E
- Country: Czech Republic
- Region: Central Bohemian
- District: Příbram
- First mentioned: 1336

Area
  - Total: 4.27 km^{2} (1.65 sq mi)
- Elevation: 530 m (1,740 ft)

Population (2026-01-01)
  - Total: 214
  - Density: 50.1/km^{2} (130/sq mi)
- Time zone: UTC+1 (CET)
  - Summer (DST): UTC+2 (CEST)
- Postal code: 262 31
- Website: www.lazsko.com

Lazsko is a municipality and village in Příbram District in the Central Bohemian Region of the Czech Republic. It has about 200 inhabitants.

== Demographics ==
Historical population
Year	Pop.	±%
1869	260	—
1880	280	+7.7%
1890	268	−4.3%
1900	298	+11.2%
1910	239	−19.8%
1921	226	−5.4%
1930	239	+5.8%
1950	164	−31.4%
1961	198	+20.7%
1970	176	−11.1%
1980	157	−10.8%
1991	139	−11.5%
2001	157	+12.9%
2011	171	+8.9%
2021	216	+26.3%
Source: Censuses
