= Vrančice =

- Municipality
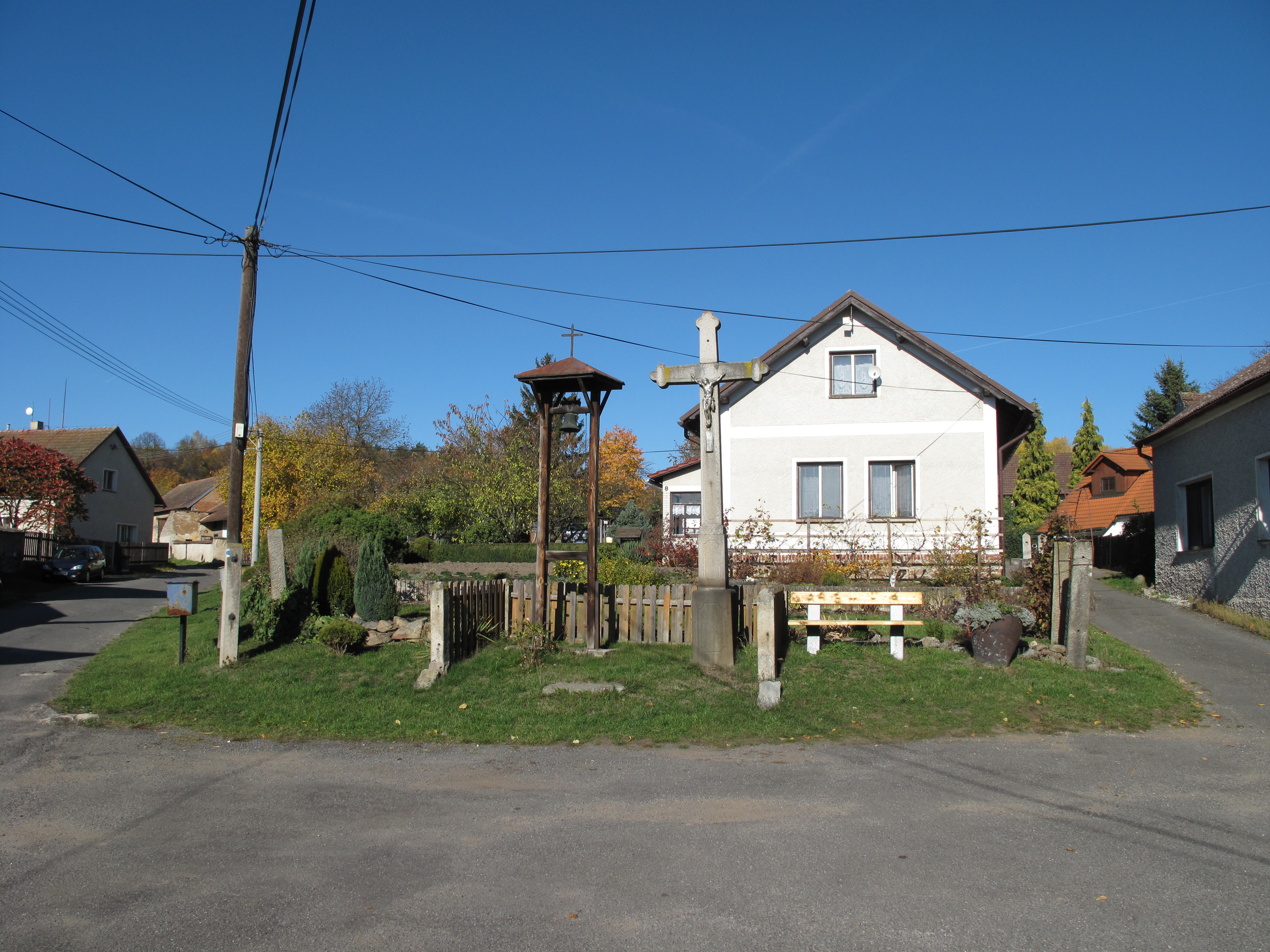
- Centre of Vrančice

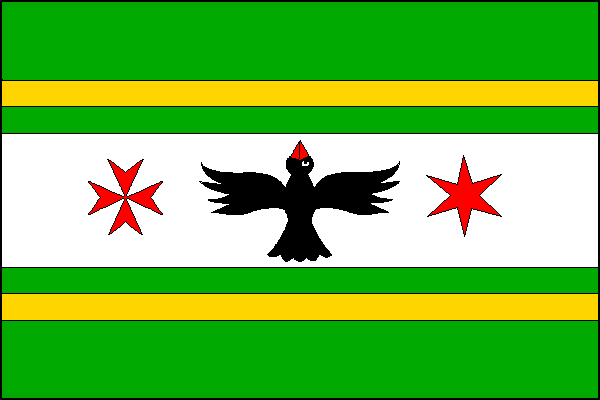
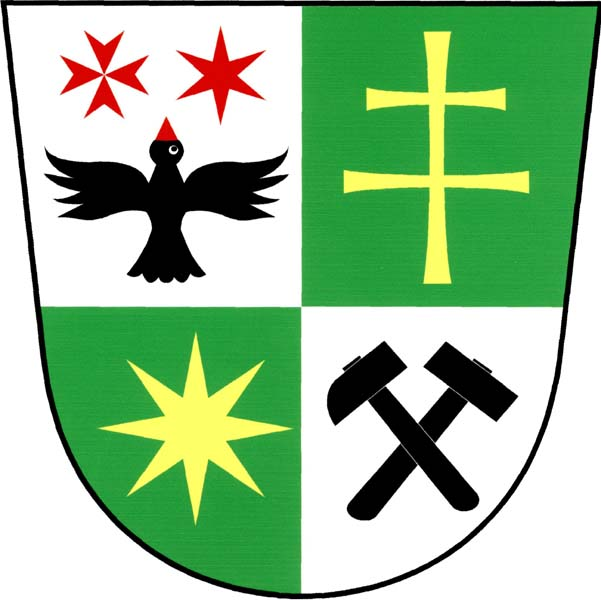
- Flag Coat of arms

- Location in the Czech Republic
- Coordinates: 49°36′39″N 14°2′30″E
- Country: Czech Republic
- Region: Central Bohemian
- District: Příbram
- First mentioned: 1253

Area
  - Total: 8.86 km^{2} (3.42 sq mi)
- Elevation: 535 m (1,755 ft)

Population (2026-01-01)
  - Total: 178
  - Density: 20.1/km^{2} (52.0/sq mi)
- Time zone: UTC+1 (CET)
  - Summer (DST): UTC+2 (CEST)
- Postal code: 262 31
- Website: www.vrancice.cz

Vrančice is a municipality and village in Příbram District in the Central Bohemian Region of the Czech Republic. It has about 200 inhabitants.

== Administrative division ==
Vrančice consists of three municipal parts (in brackets population according to the 2021 census):

- Vrančice (76)
- Mýšlovice (21)
- Životice (50)

== Demographics ==
Historical population
Year	Pop.	±%
1869	446	—
1880	432	−3.1%
1890	430	−0.5%
1900	383	−10.9%
1910	386	+0.8%
1921	341	−11.7%
1930	328	−3.8%
1950	247	−24.7%
1961	229	−7.3%
1970	216	−5.7%
1980	187	−13.4%
1991	146	−21.9%
2001	145	−0.7%
2011	138	−4.8%
2021	147	+6.5%
Source: Censuses
