= Hlubyně =

- Municipality
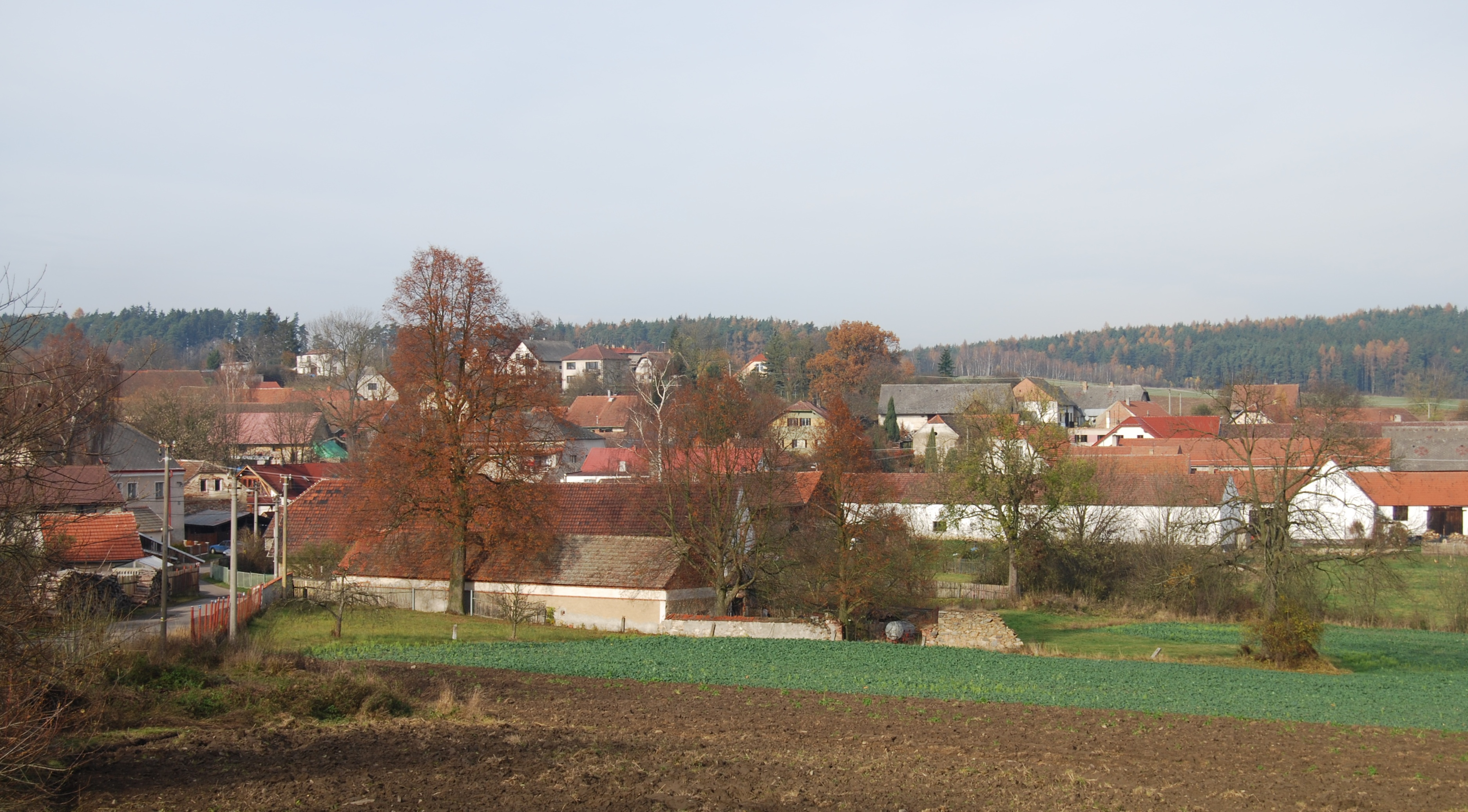
- General view

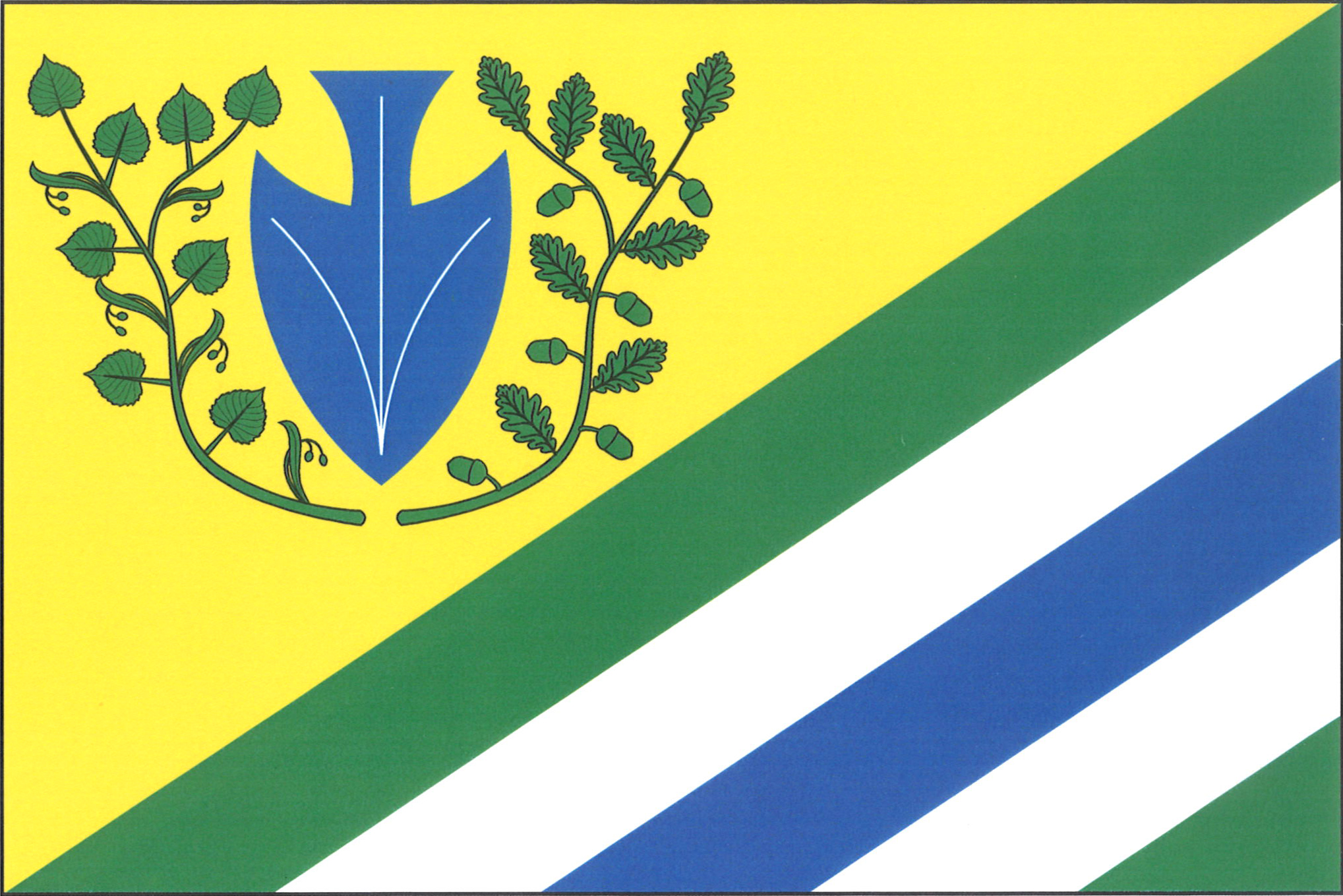
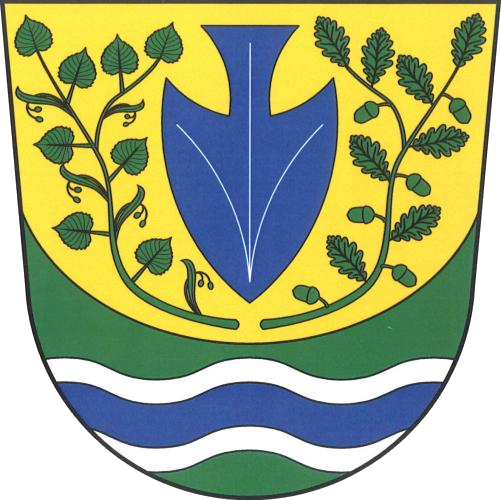
- Flag Coat of arms

- Location in the Czech Republic
- Coordinates: 49°33′35″N 13°55′24″E
- Country: Czech Republic
- Region: Central Bohemian
- District: Příbram
- First mentioned: 1419

Area
  - Total: 5.38 km^{2} (2.08 sq mi)
- Elevation: 496 m (1,627 ft)

Population (2026-01-01)
  - Total: 146
  - Density: 27.1/km^{2} (70.3/sq mi)
- Time zone: UTC+1 (CET)
  - Summer (DST): UTC+2 (CEST)
- Postal code: 262 72
- Website: www.hlubyne.cz

Hlubyně is a municipality and village in Příbram District in the Central Bohemian Region of the Czech Republic. It has about 100 inhabitants.

== Demographics ==
Historical population
Year	Pop.	±%
1869	307	—
1880	303	−1.3%
1890	300	−1.0%
1900	289	−3.7%
1910	255	−11.8%
1921	236	−7.5%
1930	227	−3.8%
1950	211	−7.0%
1961	195	−7.6%
1970	191	−2.1%
1980	161	−15.7%
1991	156	−3.1%
2001	142	−9.0%
2011	138	−2.8%
2021	144	+4.3%
Source: Censuses
