= Křešín (Příbram District) =

- Municipality
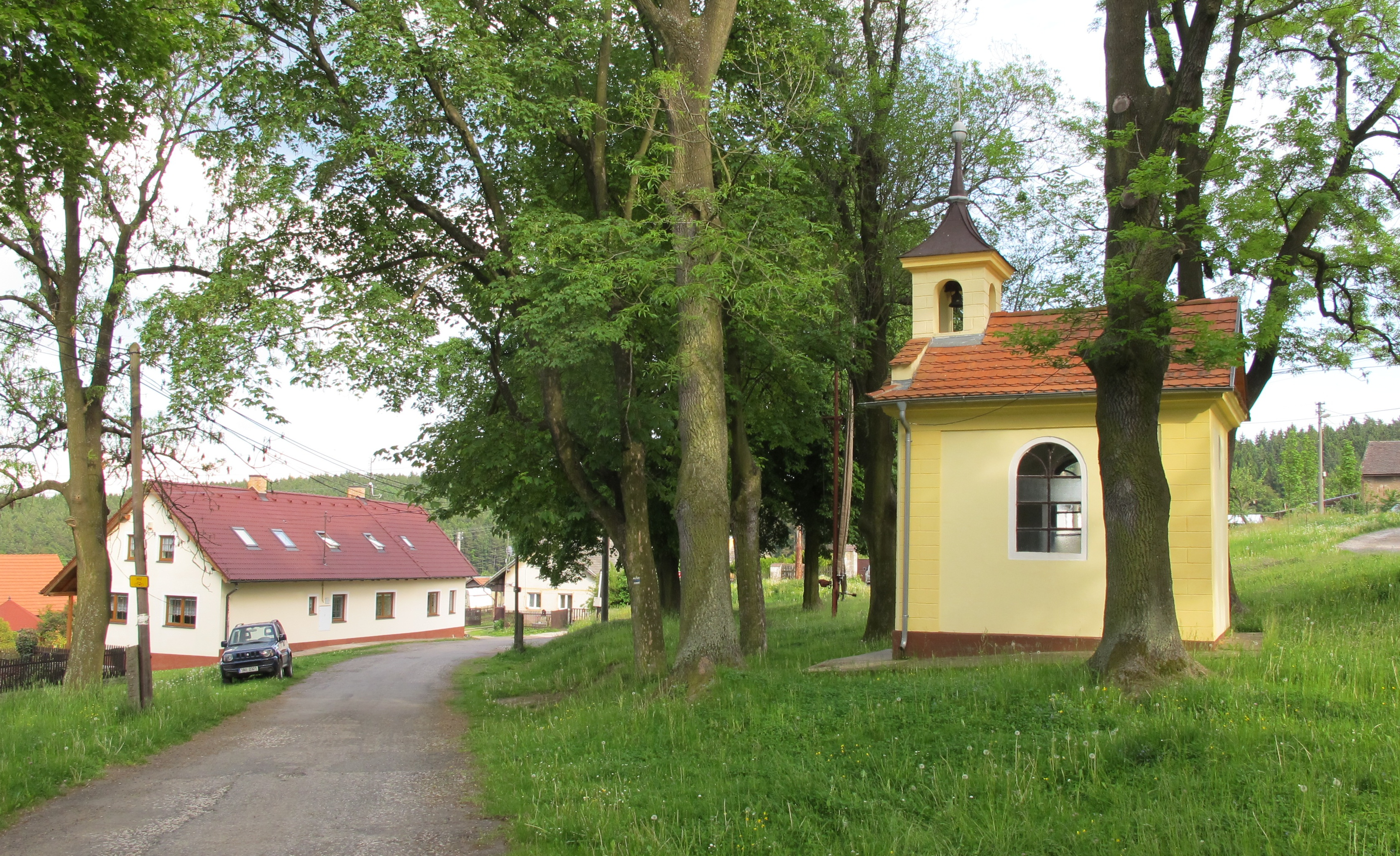
- Centre of Křešín

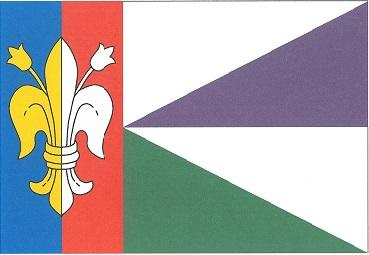
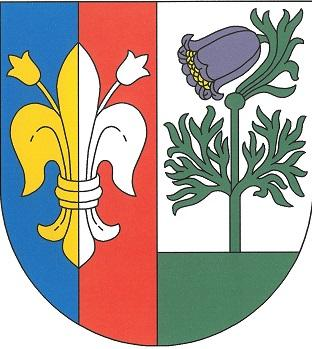
- Flag Coat of arms

- Location in the Czech Republic
- Coordinates: 49°47′58″N 13°56′53″E
- Country: Czech Republic
- Region: Central Bohemian
- District: Příbram
- First mentioned: 1370

Area
  - Total: 6.25 km^{2} (2.41 sq mi)
- Elevation: 448 m (1,470 ft)

Population (2026-01-01)
  - Total: 152
  - Density: 24.3/km^{2} (63.0/sq mi)
- Time zone: UTC+1 (CET)
  - Summer (DST): UTC+2 (CEST)
- Postal code: 262 23
- Website: www.oukresin.cz

Křešín is a municipality and village in Příbram District in the Central Bohemian Region of the Czech Republic. It has about 200 inhabitants.

== Demographics ==
Historical population
Year	Pop.	±%
1869	339	—
1880	373	+10.0%
1890	366	−1.9%
1900	348	−4.9%
1910	326	−6.3%
1921	277	−15.0%
1930	263	−5.1%
1950	193	−26.6%
1961	168	−13.0%
1970	142	−15.5%
1980	134	−5.6%
1991	112	−16.4%
2001	103	−8.0%
2011	112	+8.7%
2021	148	+32.1%
Source: Censuses
