= Svojšice (Příbram District) =

- Municipality
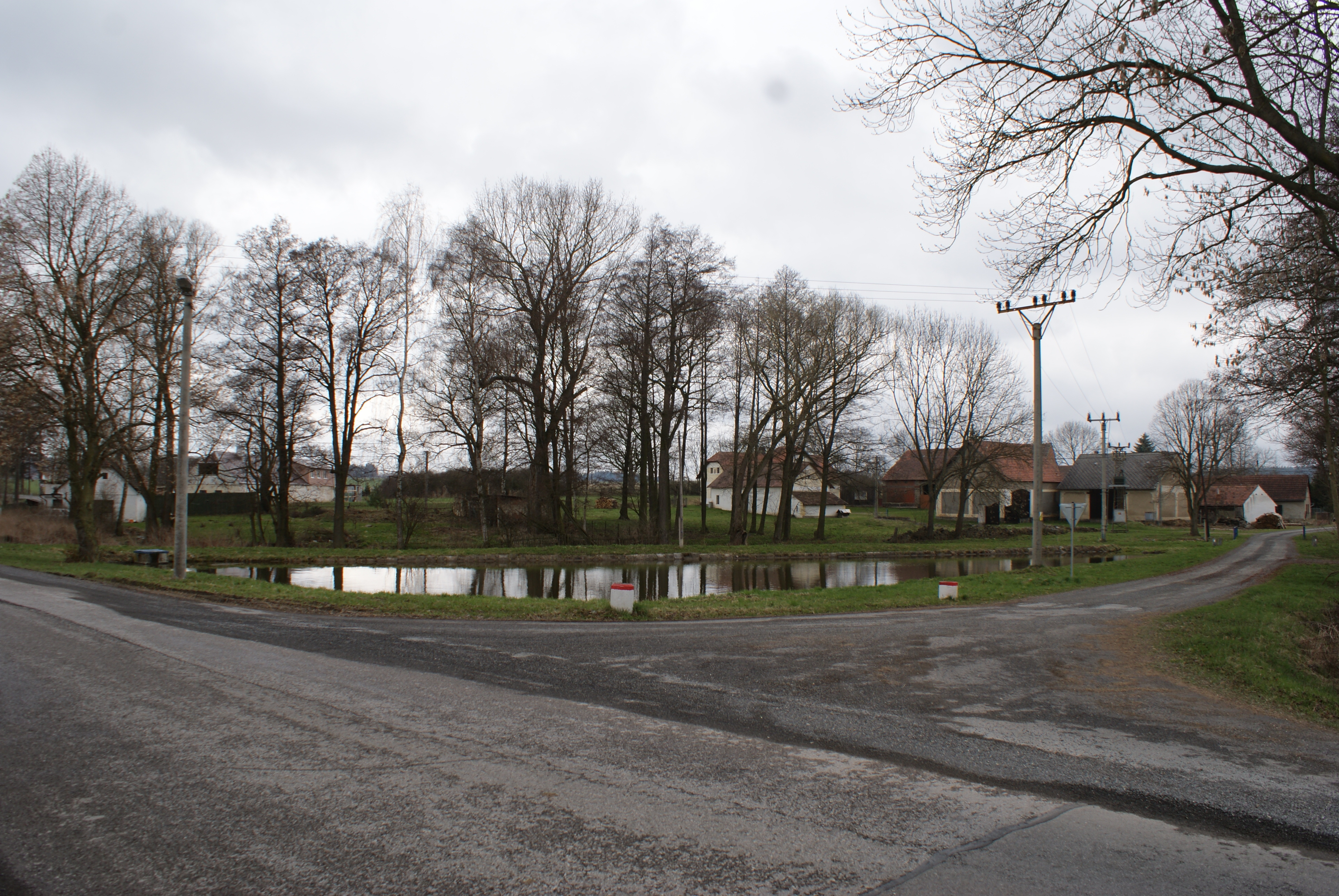
- Kletice, a part of Svojšice

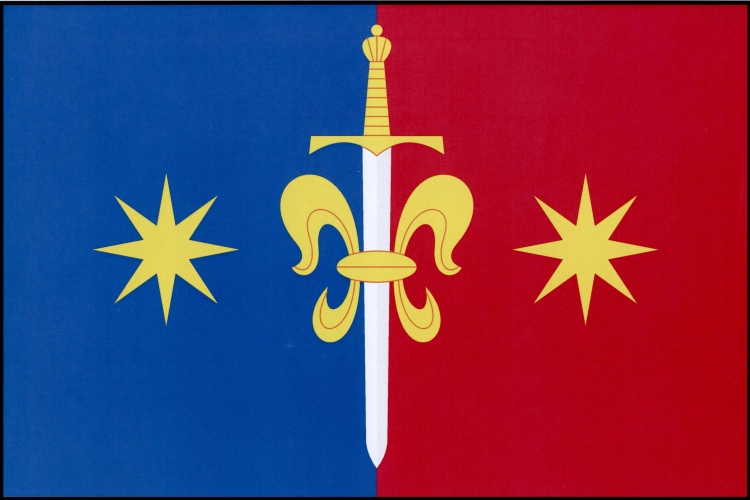
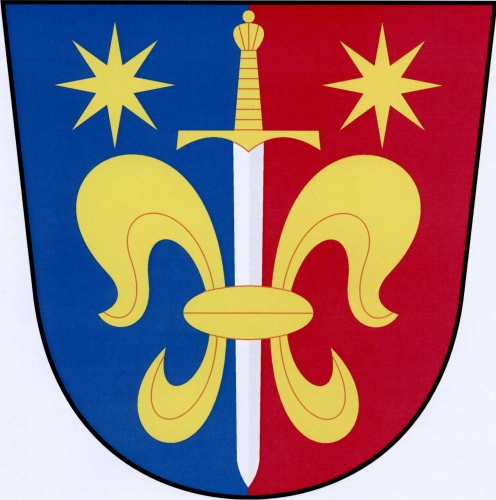
- Flag Coat of arms

- Location in the Czech Republic
- Coordinates: 49°34′22″N 14°2′34″E
- Country: Czech Republic
- Region: Central Bohemian
- District: Příbram
- First mentioned: 1012

Area
  - Total: 4.36 km^{2} (1.68 sq mi)
- Elevation: 470 m (1,540 ft)

Population (2026-01-01)
  - Total: 113
  - Density: 25.9/km^{2} (67.1/sq mi)
- Time zone: UTC+1 (CET)
  - Summer (DST): UTC+2 (CEST)
- Postal code: 262 72
- Website: www.svojsicepb.cz

Svojšice is a municipality and village in Příbram District in the Central Bohemian Region of the Czech Republic. It has about 100 inhabitants.

== Administrative division ==
Svojšice consists of two municipal parts (in brackets population according to the 2021 census):

- Svojšice (85)
- Kletice (16)

== History ==
The first written mention of Svojšice is from 1012.

== Demographics ==
Historical population
Year	Pop.	±%
1869	283	—
1880	285	+0.7%
1890	279	−2.1%
1900	254	−9.0%
1910	257	+1.2%
1921	256	−0.4%
1930	224	−12.5%
1950	169	−24.6%
1961	172	+1.8%
1970	156	−9.3%
1980	132	−15.4%
1991	101	−23.5%
2001	93	−7.9%
2011	95	+2.2%
2021	101	+6.3%
Source: Censuses
