= Háje (Příbram District) =

- Municipality
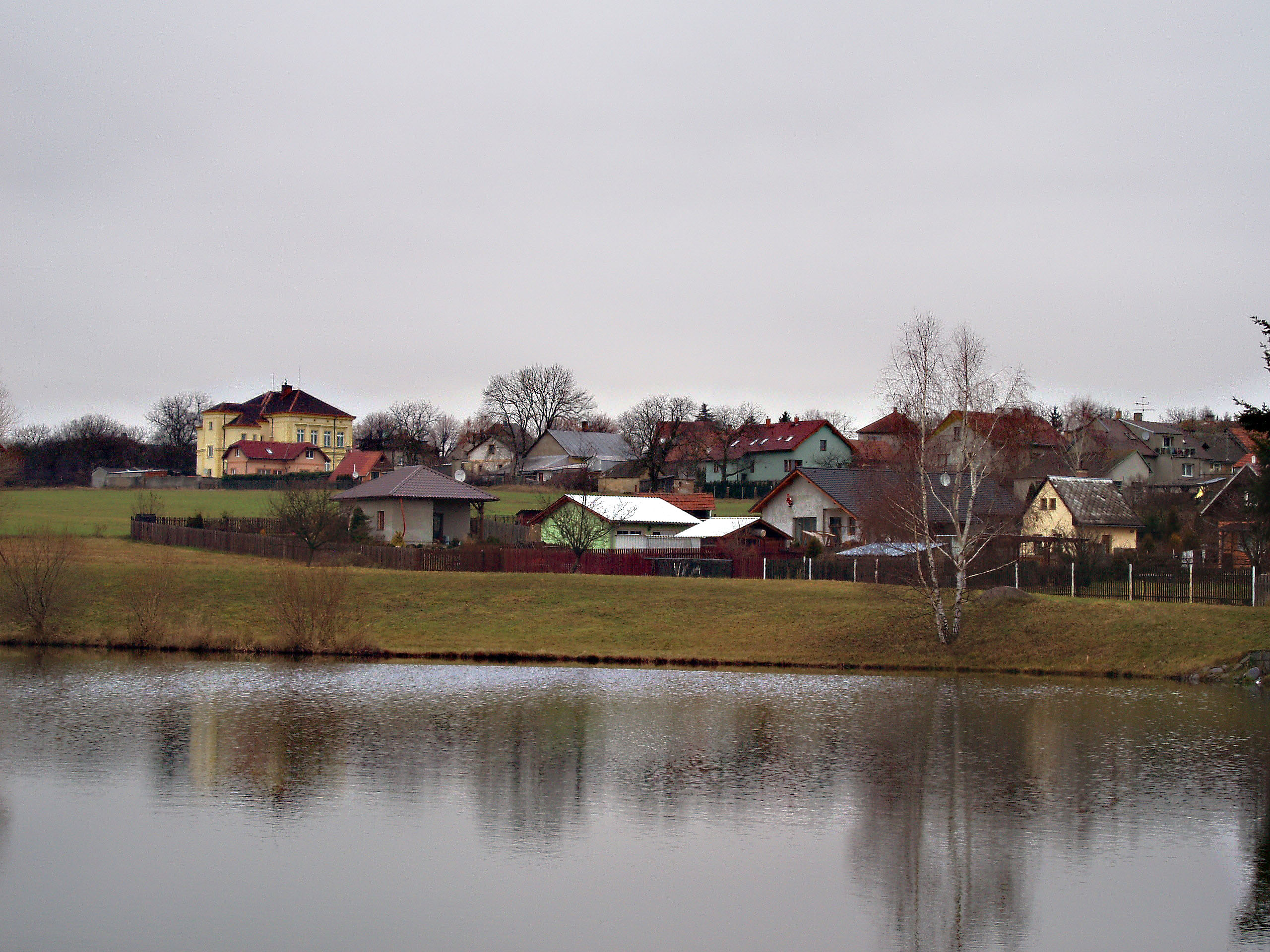
- General view

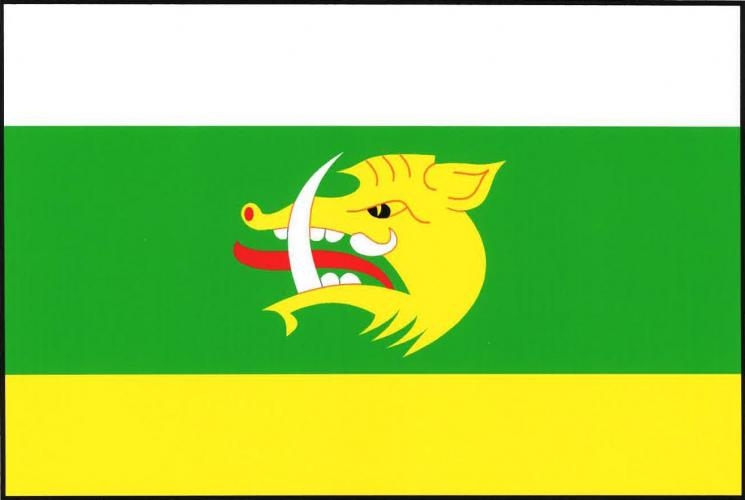
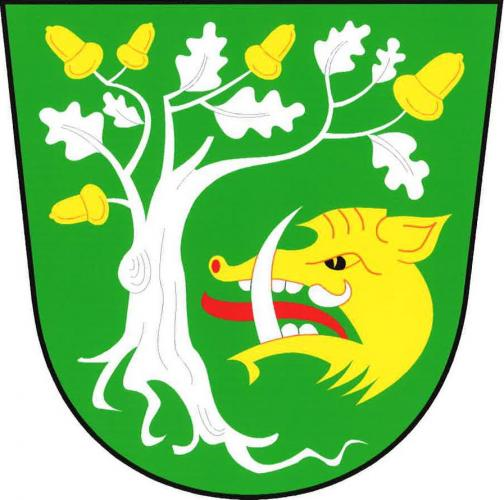
- Flag Coat of arms

- Location in the Czech Republic
- Coordinates: 49°40′22″N 14°2′51″E
- Country: Czech Republic
- Region: Central Bohemian
- District: Příbram
- First mentioned: 1603

Area
  - Total: 3.99 km^{2} (1.54 sq mi)
- Elevation: 575 m (1,886 ft)

Population (2026-01-01)
  - Total: 613
  - Density: 154/km^{2} (398/sq mi)
- Time zone: UTC+1 (CET)
  - Summer (DST): UTC+2 (CEST)
- Postal code: 261 01
- Website: www.haje-obec.cz

Háje is a municipality and village in Příbram District in the Central Bohemian Region of the Czech Republic. It has about 600 inhabitants.

== Demographics ==
Historical population
Year	Pop.	±%
1869	223	—
1880	223	+0.0%
1890	270	+21.1%
1900	242	−10.4%
1910	327	+35.1%
1921	285	−12.8%
1930	255	−10.5%
1950	202	−20.8%
1961	225	+11.4%
1970	237	+5.3%
1980	228	−3.8%
1991	237	+3.9%
2001	242	+2.1%
2011	382	+57.9%
2021	545	+42.7%
Source: Censuses
