= Nepomuk (Příbram District) =

- Municipality
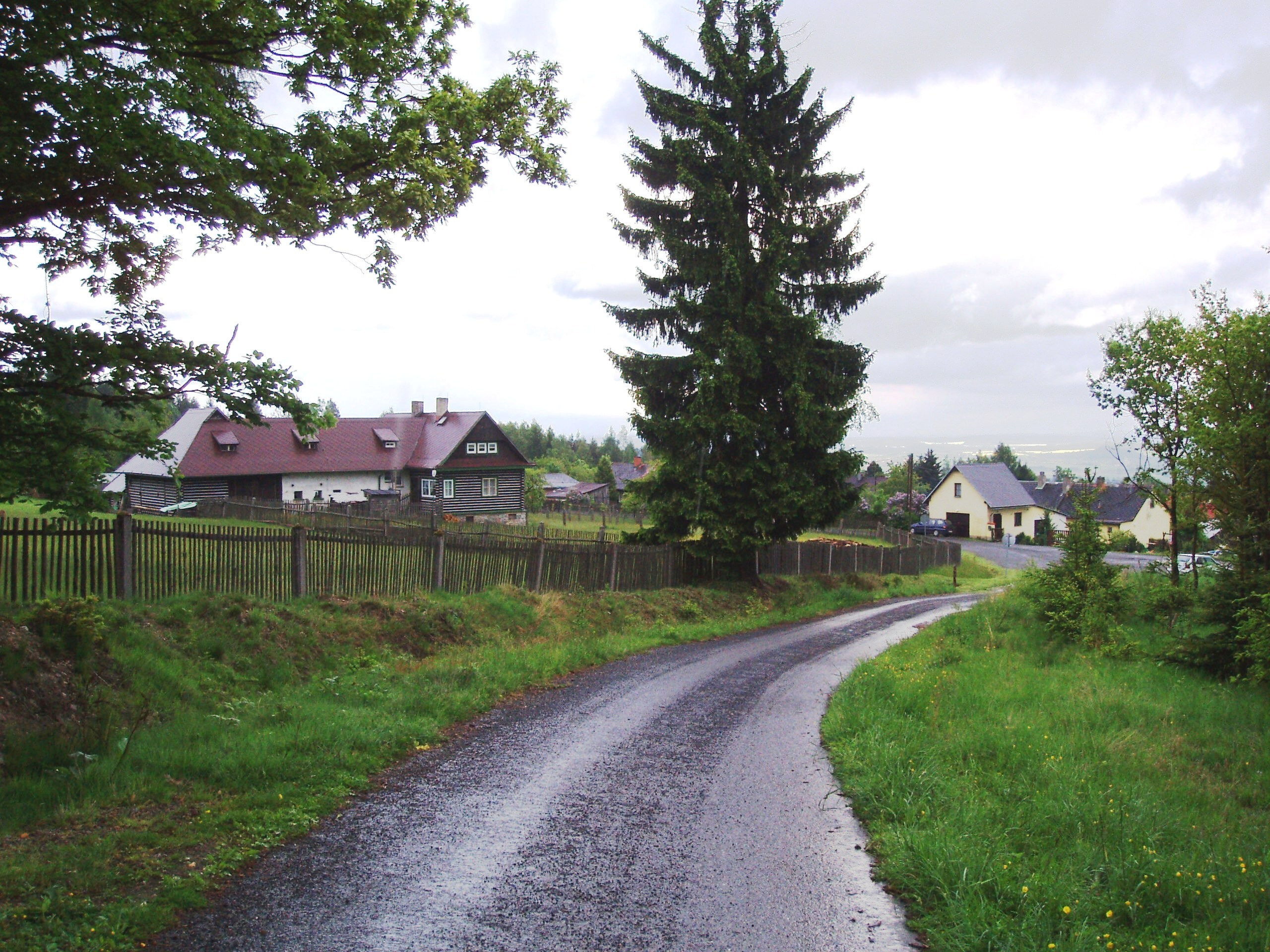
- Side street

- Location in the Czech Republic
- Coordinates: 49°38′34″N 13°50′14″E
- Country: Czech Republic
- Region: Central Bohemian
- District: Příbram
- Founded: 1727

Area
  - Total: 20.09 km^{2} (7.76 sq mi)
- Elevation: 643 m (2,110 ft)

Population (2026-01-01)
  - Total: 231
  - Density: 11.5/km^{2} (29.8/sq mi)
- Time zone: UTC+1 (CET)
  - Summer (DST): UTC+2 (CEST)
- Postal code: 262 42
- Website: nepomuk-pb.cz

Nepomuk is a municipality and village in Příbram District in the Central Bohemian Region of the Czech Republic. It has about 200 inhabitants.

== Demographics ==
Historical population
Year	Pop.	±%
1869	306	—
1880	318	+3.9%
1890	467	+46.9%
1900	330	−29.3%
1910	378	+14.5%
1921	477	+26.2%
1930	247	−48.2%
1950	287	+16.2%
1961	325	+13.2%
1970	177	−45.5%
1980	124	−29.9%
1991	190	+53.2%
2001	185	−2.6%
2011	201	+8.6%
2021	233	+15.9%
Source: Censuses
