= Kocába =

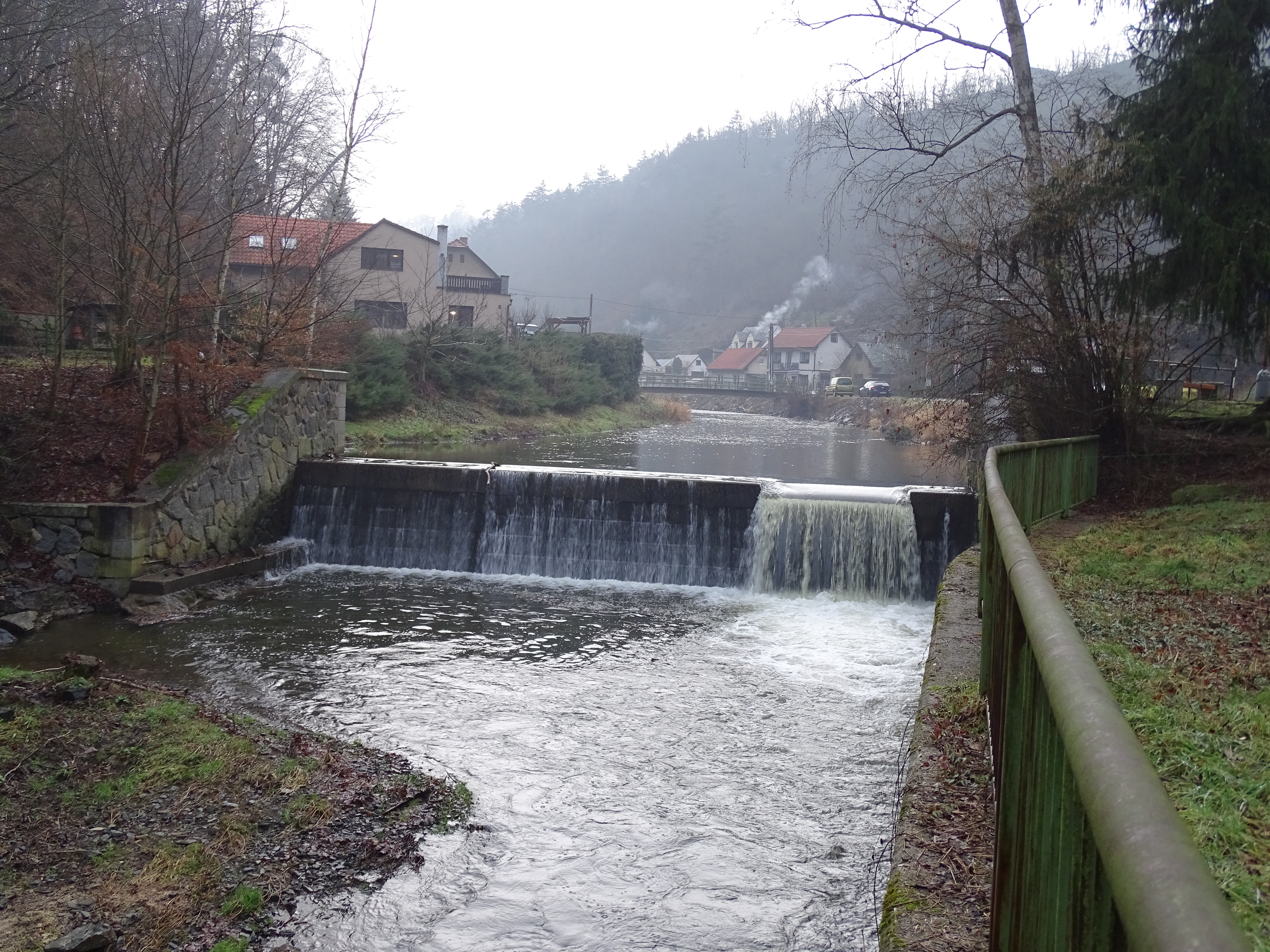
- The Kocába in Štěchovice

Location
- Country: Czech Republic
- Region: Central Bohemian

Physical characteristics
- Source
  - location: Dubno, Brdy Highlands
  - coordinates: 49°41′14″N 14°2′4″E
  - elevation: 550 m (1,800 ft)
- Mouth
  - location: Vltava
  - coordinates: 49°51′8″N 14°24′23″E
  - elevation: 201 m (659 ft)
- Length: 47.7 km (29.6 mi)
- Basin size: 312.6 km^{2} (120.7 sq mi)
- Discharge
  - average: 0.62 m^{3}/s (22 cu ft/s) near estuary

Basin features
- Progression: Vltava→ Elbe→ North Sea

The Kocába is a river in the Czech Republic, a left tributary of the Vltava River. It flows through the Central Bohemian Region. It is 47.7 km (29.6 mi) long.

== Etymology ==
The initial name of the river was Chocava, however, the origin of the name is unsure. According to one theory, the name of has the root chot-, chod- (meaning 'to guard', from the word chodit = 'to walk') and is derived from the guarding of the trade route from Prague to southern Bohemia that led through Chotobuš locality in what is today the town of Dobříš. The name Kocába gradually evolved from Chocava. The oldest written document of the river is from 1361, when the name was written as Koczaw.

== Characteristic ==
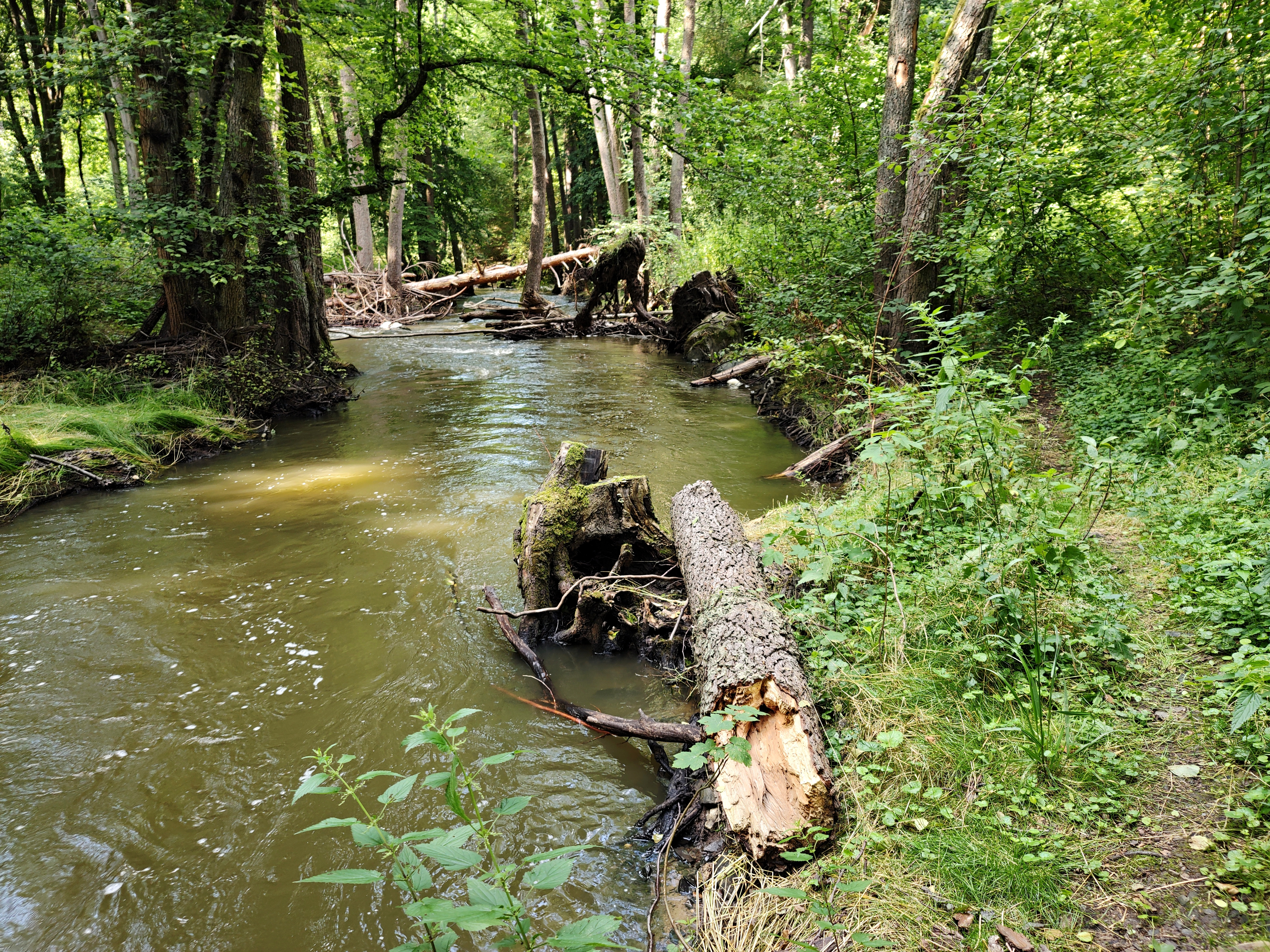
The Kocába in Mokrovraty-Pouště

The Kocába originates in the territory of Dubno in the Brdy Highlands at an elevation of 550 m (1,800 ft), and flows to Štěchovice, where it enters the Vltava River at an elevation of 201 m (659 ft). It is 47.7 km (29.6 mi) long. Its drainage basin has an area of 312.6 km^{2} (120.7 sq mi).

The longest tributaries of the Kocába are:

Tributary	Length (km)	Side
Sychrovský potok	20.7	left
Voznický potok	13.1	left
Novoveský potok	6.9	left

== Course ==
The river flows through the municipal territories of Dubno, Dubenec, Drásov, Višňová, Ouběnice, Daleké Dušníky, Rybníky, Stará Huť, Mokrovraty, Nový Knín, Malá Hraštice, Velká Lečice, Bojanovice, Bratřínov, Slapy and Štěchovice.

== Bodies of water ==
There are 270 bodies of water in the basin area. The largest of them is the fishpond Huťský rybník with an area of 31.1 ha (77 acres), built on the stream of Sychrovský potok. Several fishponds are built on the upper course of the Kocába.

== History ==
In the Middle Ages, the banks of the Kocába were popular for gold panning. After World War I, the valley of the Kocába became a popular destinations for tramps. In the 1930s, several tramping hamlets were established along the river.

== See also ==
- List of rivers of the Czech Republic
