= Velká Lečice =

- Municipality
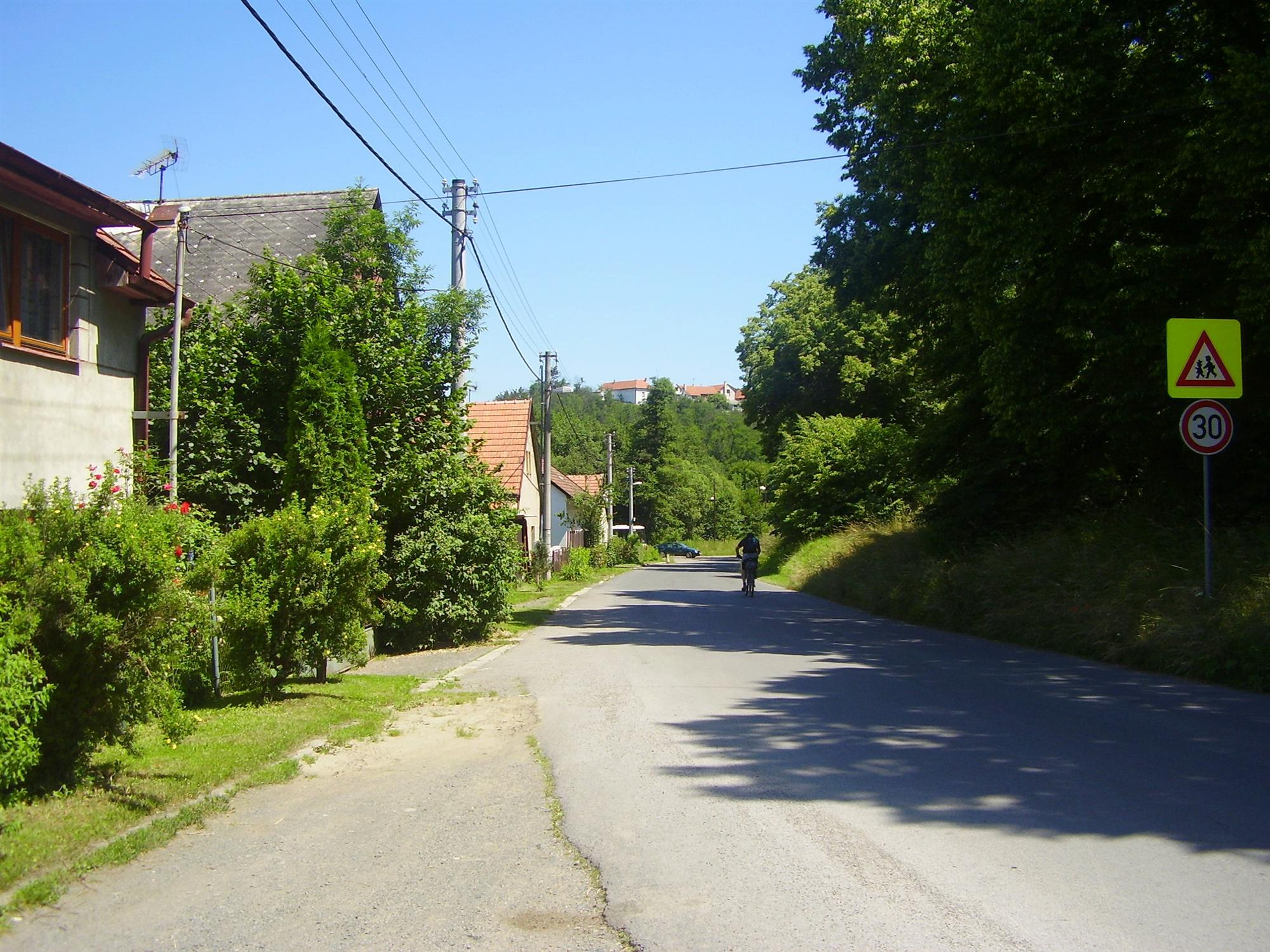
- Street in Velká Lečice

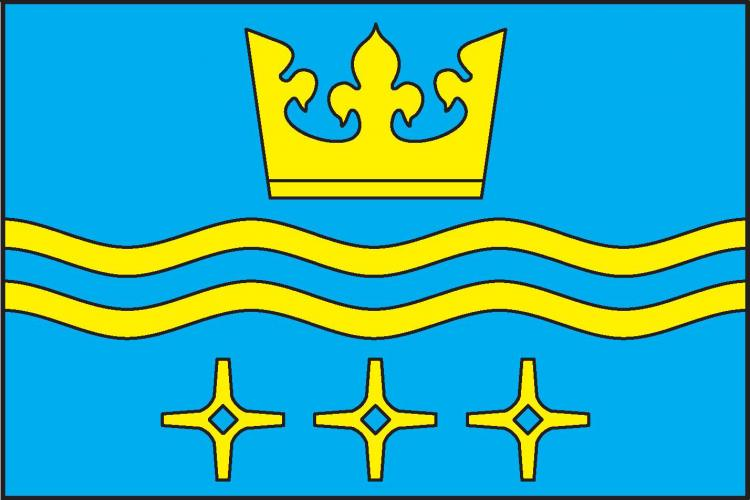
- Flag Coat of arms

- Location in the Czech Republic
- Coordinates: 49°48′53″N 14°19′25″E
- Country: Czech Republic
- Region: Central Bohemian
- District: Příbram
- First mentioned: 1412

Area
  - Total: 5.20 km^{2} (2.01 sq mi)
- Elevation: 298 m (978 ft)

Population (2026-01-01)
  - Total: 193
  - Density: 37.1/km^{2} (96.1/sq mi)
- Time zone: UTC+1 (CET)
  - Summer (DST): UTC+2 (CEST)
- Postal code: 262 05
- Website: www.velkalecice.cz

Velká Lečice is a municipality and village in Příbram District in the Central Bohemian Region of the Czech Republic. It has about 200 inhabitants.

== Etymology ==
The initial name of the settlement was Velká Ledčice. The name Ledčice is a diminutive form of Ledce, which is a common Czech toponym. The old Czech word ledce originated as a diminutive of the word lado, which denoted unploughed land. In the 17th century, Ledčice was distorted to Lečice. The prefix Velká ('great') serves to distinguish it from the neighbouring village of Malá Lečice ('small Lečice', today a part of Bojanovice).

== Geography ==
Velká Lečice is located about 27 kilometres (17 mi) northeast of Příbram and 25 km (16 mi) south of Prague. It lies in the Benešov Uplands. The highest point is at 395 m (1,296 ft) above sea level. The Kocába River flows through the municipality.

== History ==
Gold panning was documented in the area of Velká Lečice in the 11th century. The first written mention of Velká Lečice is from 1412.

== Demographics ==
Historical population

Year	Pop.	±%
1869	334	—
1880	355	+6.3%
1890	353	−0.6%
1900	362	+2.5%
1910	346	−4.4%

Year	Pop.	±%
1921	314	−9.2%
1930	300	−4.5%
1950	238	−20.7%
1961	251	+5.5%
1970	208	−17.1%

Year	Pop.	±%
1980	180	−13.5%
1991	163	−9.4%
2001	175	+7.4%
2011	179	+2.3%
2021	197	+10.1%

Source: Censuses

== Transport ==
There are no railways or major roads passing through the municipality.

== Sights ==
Velká Lečice is poor in monuments. The only protected cultural monument is a late Baroque niche chapel, built probably at the end of the 18th century.
