= Drásov =

Drásov or Drașov may refer to places:

== Czech Republic ==
- Drásov (Brno-Country District), a market town in the South Moravian Region
- Drásov (Příbram District), a municipality and village in the Central Bohemian Region

== Romania ==
- Drașov, a village in Șpring commune in Transylvania
