= Stará Huť =

- Municipality
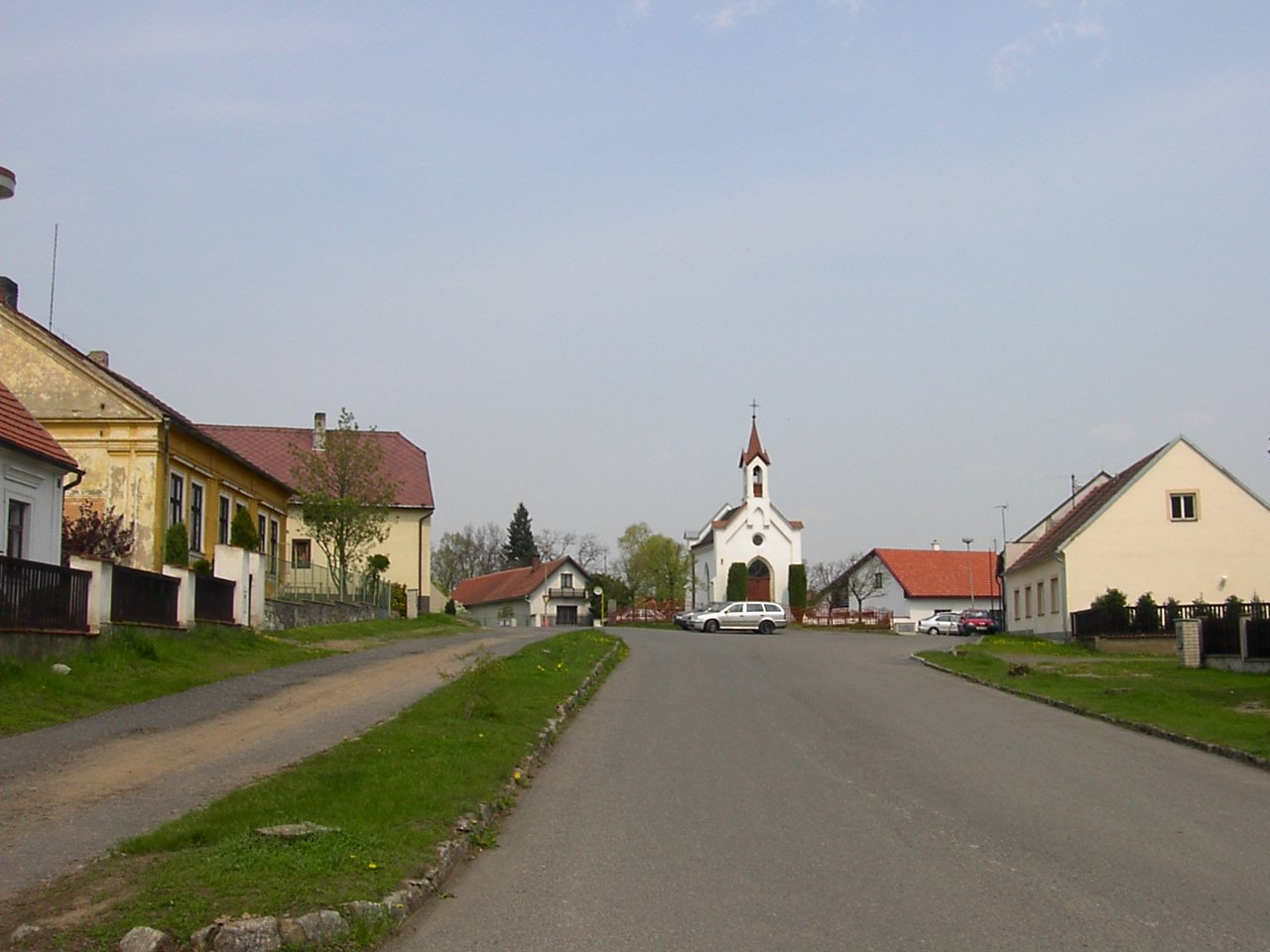
- Centre of Stará Huť

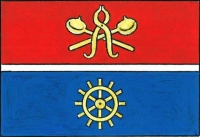
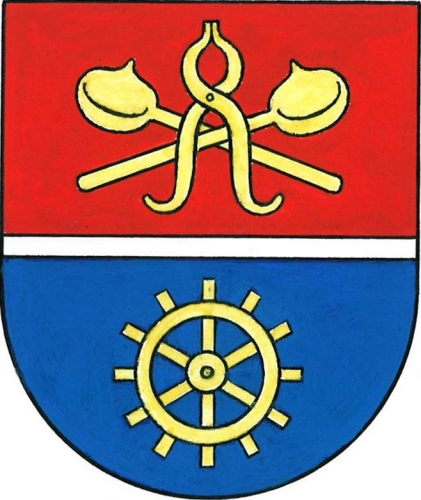
- Flag Coat of arms

- Location in the Czech Republic
- Coordinates: 49°46′56″N 14°11′51″E
- Country: Czech Republic
- Region: Central Bohemian
- District: Příbram
- Founded: 1674

Area
  - Total: 8.26 km^{2} (3.19 sq mi)
- Elevation: 352 m (1,155 ft)

Population (2026-01-01)
  - Total: 1,677
  - Density: 203/km^{2} (526/sq mi)
- Time zone: UTC+1 (CET)
  - Summer (DST): UTC+2 (CEST)
- Postal code: 262 02
- Website: www.starahut.eu

Stará Huť is a municipality and village in Příbram District in the Central Bohemian Region of the Czech Republic. It has about 1,700 inhabitants.

== Etymology ==
The name literally means 'old smelter' in Czech.

== Geography ==
Stará Huť is located about 17 kilometres (11 mi) northeast of Příbram and 31 km (19 mi) southwest of Prague. It lies in the Benešov Uplands. The highest point is the hill Studený vrch at 382 m (1,253 ft) above sea level. The Kocába River flows along the southeastern municipal border. The village is situated on the shore of the Strž fishpond.

== History ==
Stará Huť was founded around 1674, originally for the purposes of metallurgy.

== Demographics ==
Historical population

Year	Pop.	±%
1869	1,249	—
1880	1,206	−3.4%
1890	1,243	+3.1%
1900	1,311	+5.5%
1910	1,459	+11.3%

Year	Pop.	±%
1921	1,323	−9.3%
1930	1,251	−5.4%
1950	1,154	−7.8%
1961	1,246	+8.0%
1970	1,276	+2.4%

Year	Pop.	±%
1980	1,088	−14.7%
1991	1,076	−1.1%
2001	1,142	+6.1%
2011	1,260	+10.3%
2021	1,587	+26.0%

Source: Censuses

== Transport ==
The D4 motorway from Prague to Písek runs through the western part of the municipality.

Stará Huť is located on the railway line Prague–Dobříš.

== Sights ==
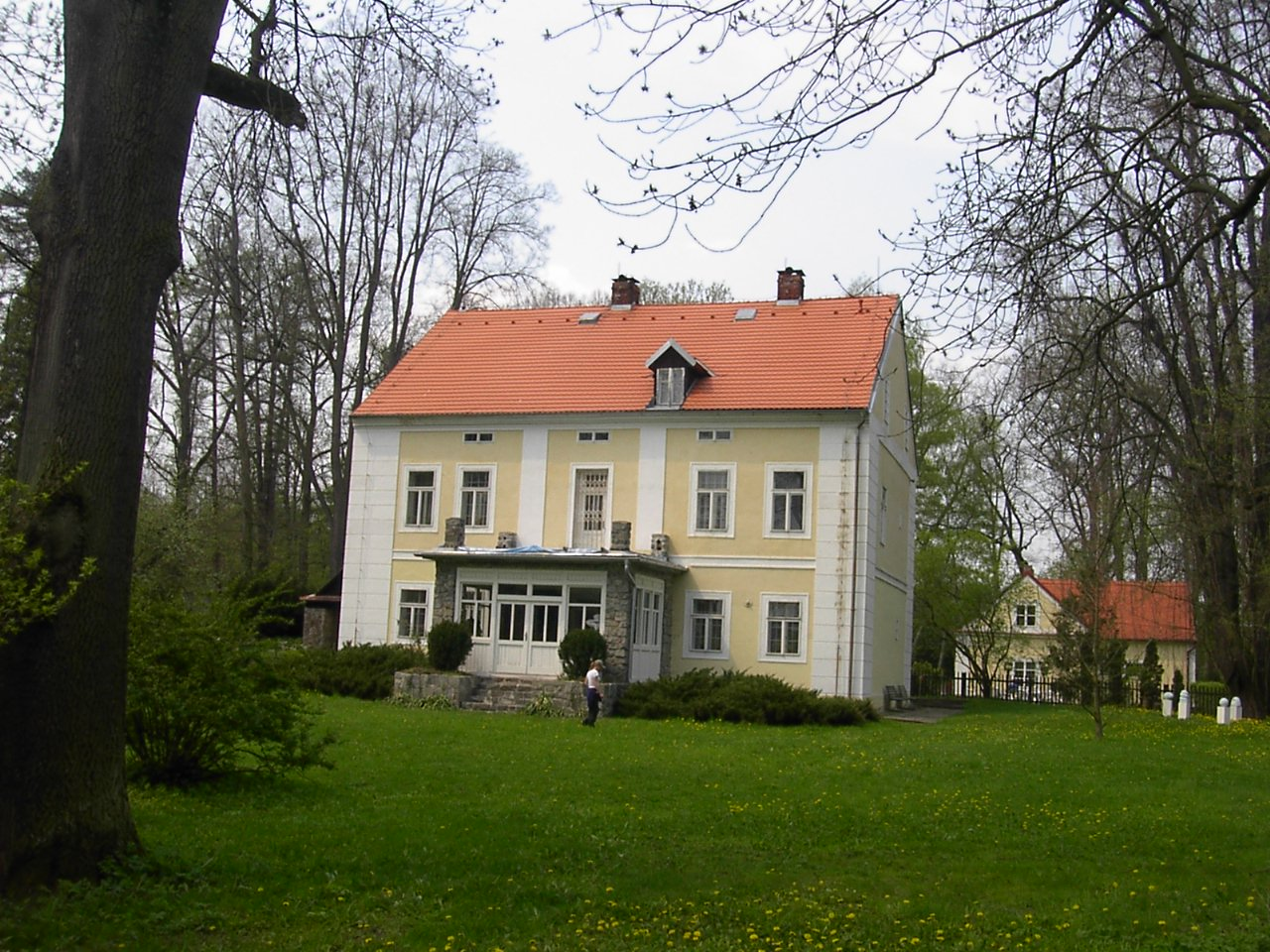
Summer residence of Karel Čapek

The only cultural monument in Stará Huť is a villa, which was owned by the Czech writer Karel Čapek and used as his summer residence. He spent much time working and relaxing there between 1935 and 1938. Today there is a small museum.

== Notable people ==
- Martin Myšička (born 1970), actor
