= Malá Hraštice =

- Municipality
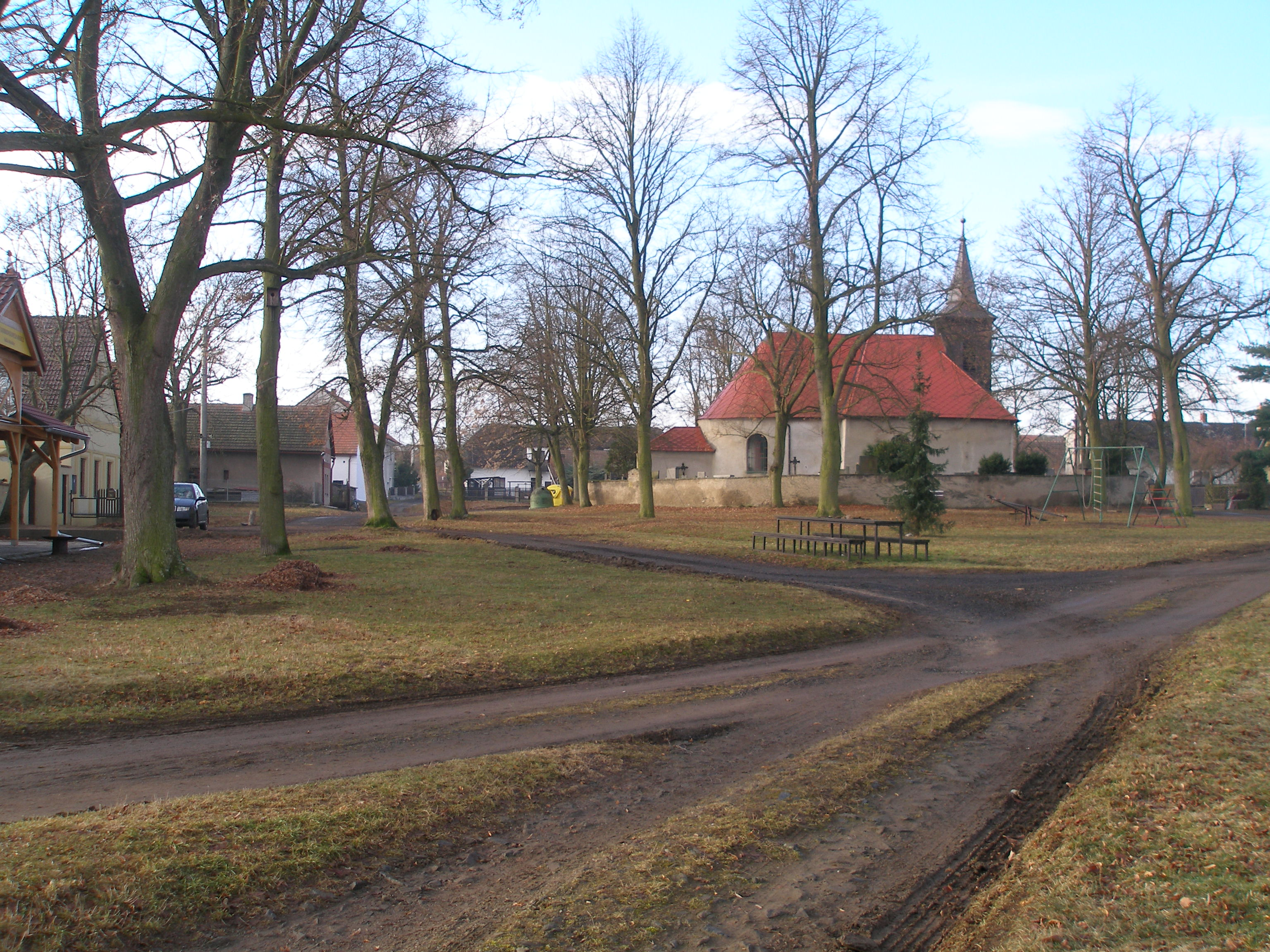
- Velká Hraštice, a part of Malá Hraštice

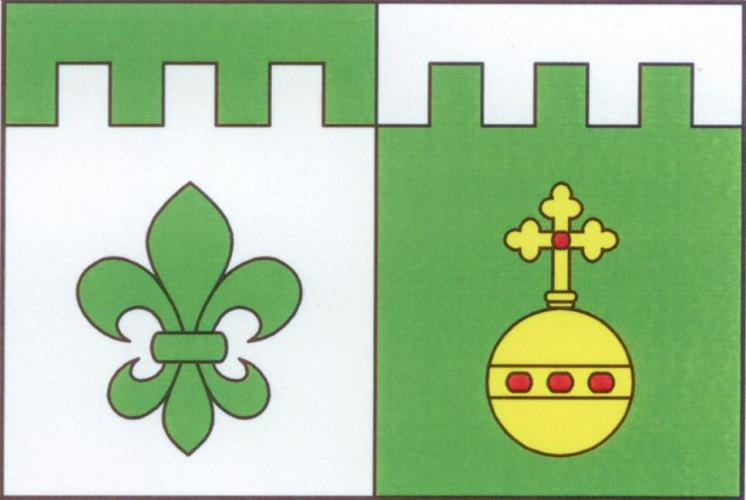
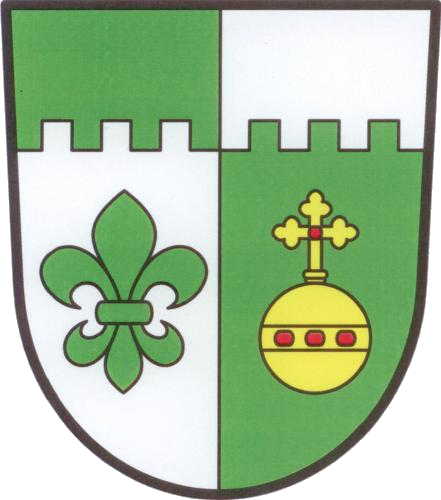
- Flag Coat of arms

- Location in the Czech Republic
- Coordinates: 49°33′16″N 14°20′15″E
- Country: Czech Republic
- Region: Central Bohemian
- District: Příbram
- First mentioned: 1454

Area
  - Total: 9.28 km^{2} (3.58 sq mi)
- Elevation: 356 m (1,168 ft)

Population (2026-01-01)
  - Total: 1,166
  - Density: 126/km^{2} (325/sq mi)
- Time zone: UTC+1 (CET)
  - Summer (DST): UTC+2 (CEST)
- Postal code: 262 03
- Website: www.malahrastice.cz

Malá Hraštice is a municipality and village in Příbram District in the Central Bohemian Region of the Czech Republic. It has about 1,200 inhabitants.

== Administrative division ==
Malá Hraštice consists of two municipal parts (in brackets population according to the 2021 census):

- Malá Hraštice (641)
- Velká Hraštice (489)

== Etymology ==
The initial name of Malá Hraštice was Hraščice. The name was derived from the surname Hrášek, meaning "the village of Hrášek's people". Velká Hraštice was originally named Petrova Lhota ('Petr's Lhota). At the turn of the 16th and 17th centuries, they became known as Malá ('small') Hraštice and Velká ('great') Hraštice.

== Geography ==
Malá Hraštice is located about 24 kilometres (15 mi) northeast of Příbram and 25 km (16 mi) south of Prague. It lies in the Benešov Uplands. The highest point is the flat hill Na Vinici at 408 m (1,339 ft) above sea level. The Kocába River flows along the eastern municipal border. The stream Voznický potok flows along the southern border until it joins the Kocába.

== History ==
The first written mention of Malá Hraštice is from 1454. Velká Hraštice was first mentioned in 1360, when the local church was promoted to a parish church. In 1639, during the Thirty Years' War, both villages were destroyed by the Swedish army and most of the inhabitants were killed. From 1595 until the establishment of an independent municipality in 1848, Malá Hraštice was part of the Dobříš estate and shared its owners.

== Demographics ==
Historical population

Year	Pop.	±%
1869	628	—
1880	708	+12.7%
1890	724	+2.3%
1900	652	−9.9%
1910	722	+10.7%

Year	Pop.	±%
1921	679	−6.0%
1930	707	+4.1%
1950	692	−2.1%
1961	713	+3.0%
1970	714	+0.1%

Year	Pop.	±%
1980	665	−6.9%
1991	594	−10.7%
2001	665	+12.0%
2011	943	+41.8%
2021	1,130	+19.8%

Source: Censuses

== Transport ==
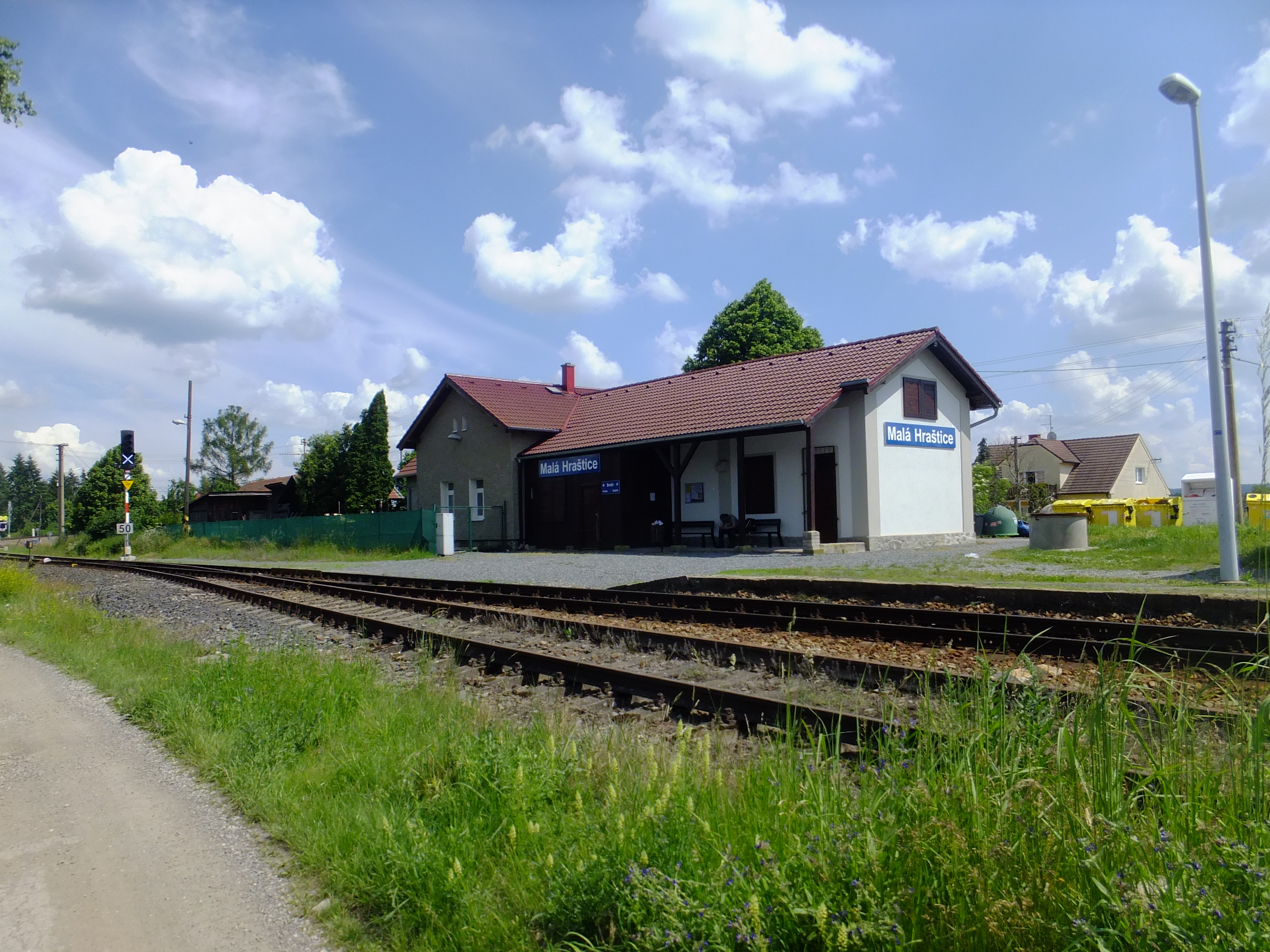
Train station

Malá Hraštice is located on the railway line Prague–Dobříš.

== Sights ==
The main landmark of the municipality is the Church of Saint Sigismund, located in Velká Hraštice. The originally medieval church was gradually modified to its present form in the 18th and 19th centuries.
