= Mokrovraty =

- Municipality
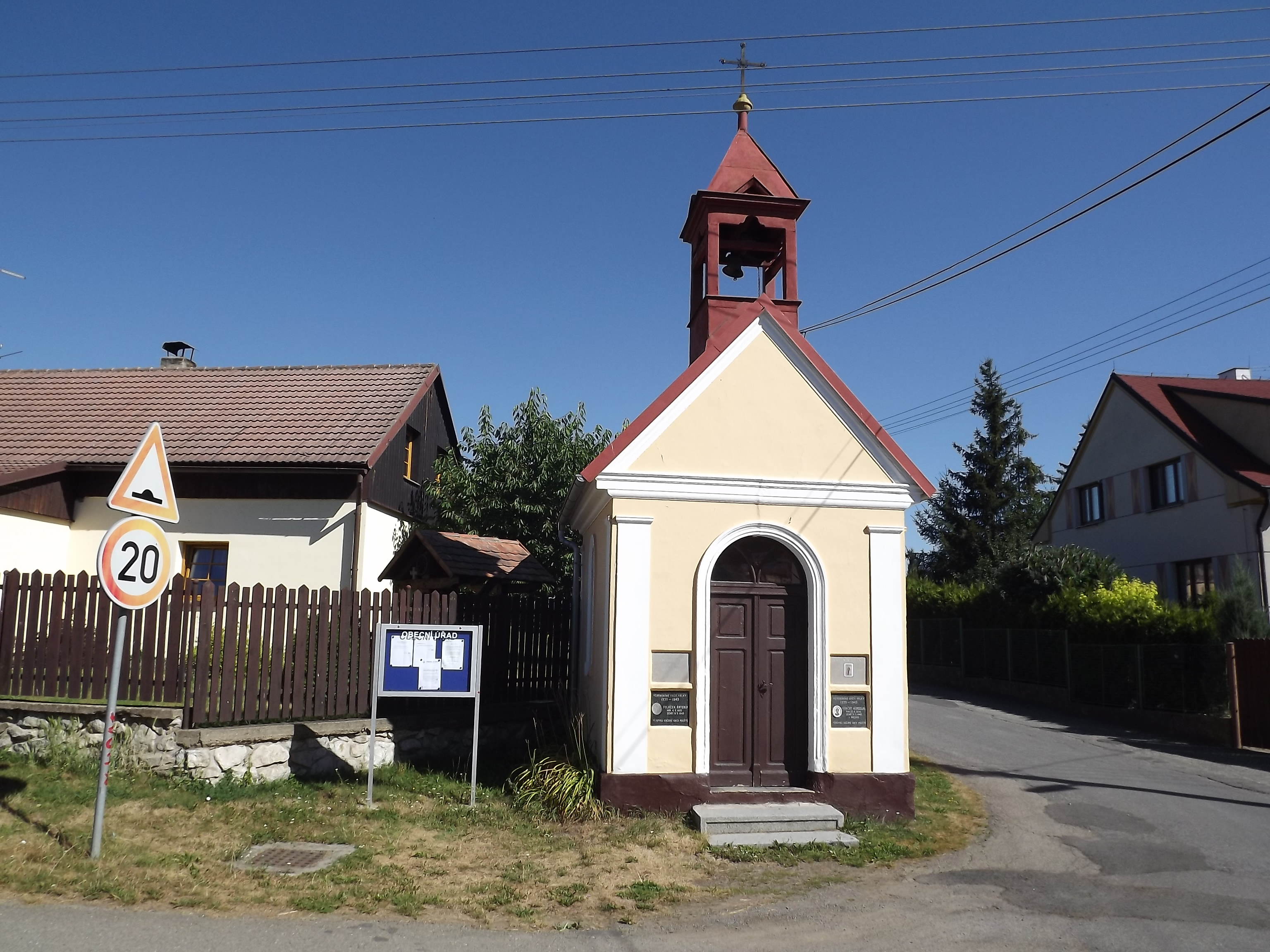
- Chapel of Saint John the Baptist in Pouště

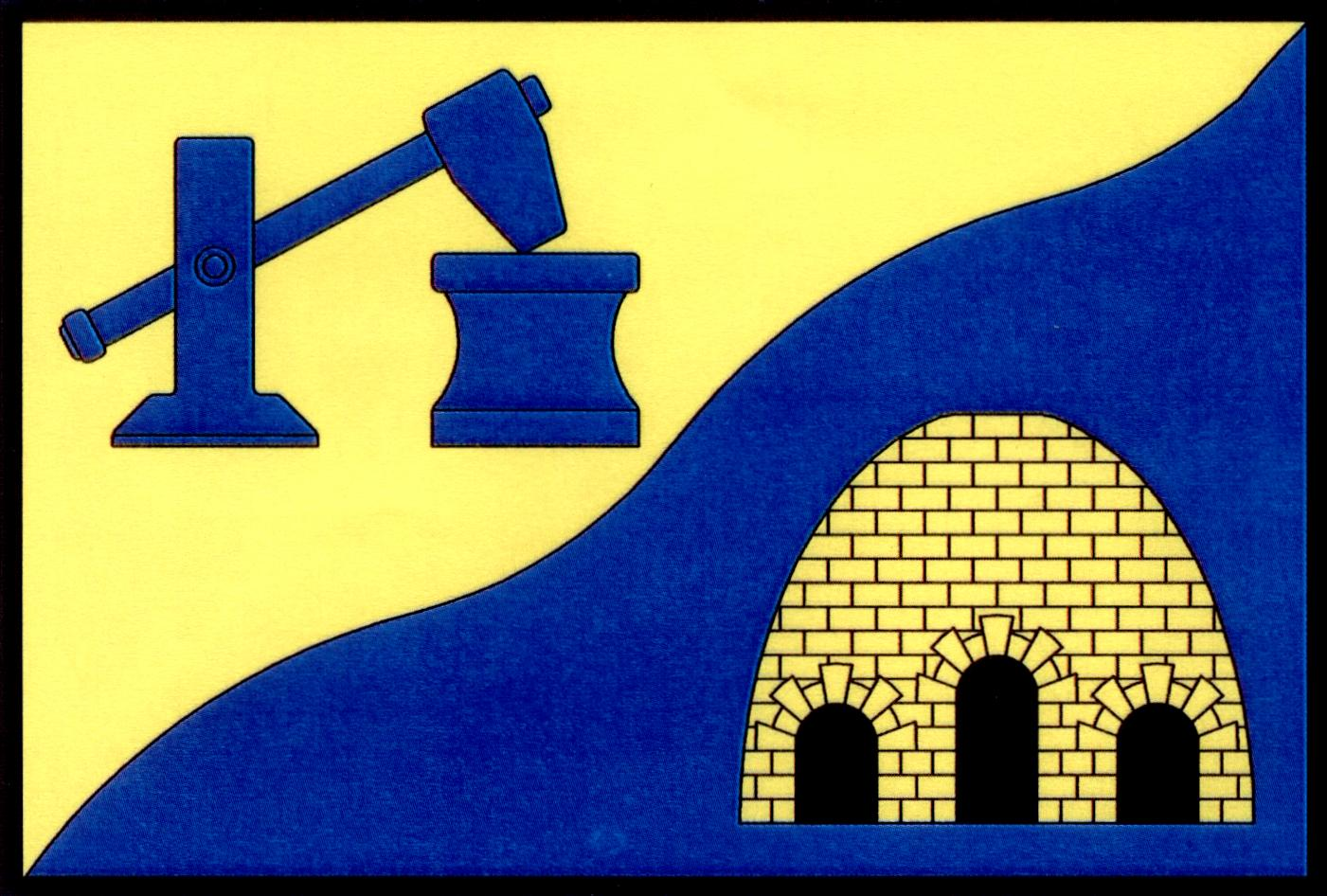
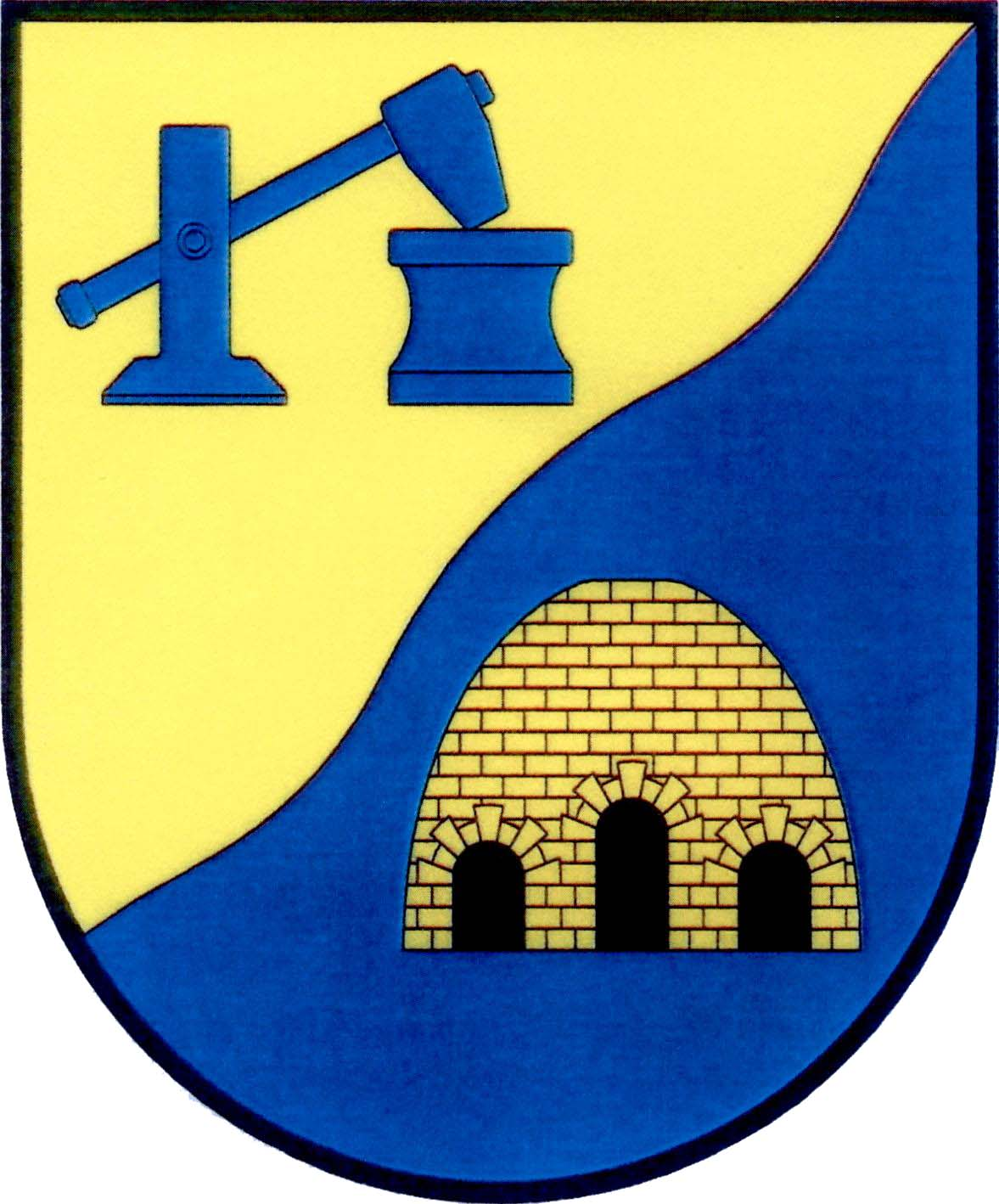
- Flag Coat of arms

- Location in the Czech Republic
- Coordinates: 49°47′50″N 14°15′20″E
- Country: Czech Republic
- Region: Central Bohemian
- District: Příbram
- First mentioned: 1304

Area
  - Total: 13.79 km^{2} (5.32 sq mi)
- Elevation: 365 m (1,198 ft)

Population (2026-01-01)
  - Total: 797
  - Density: 57.8/km^{2} (150/sq mi)
- Time zone: UTC+1 (CET)
  - Summer (DST): UTC+2 (CEST)
- Postal code: 262 03
- Website: www.mokrovraty-obec.cz

Mokrovraty is a municipality and village in Příbram District in the Central Bohemian Region of the Czech Republic. It has about 800 inhabitants.

== Administrative division ==
Mokrovraty consists of two municipal parts (in brackets population according to the 2021 census):

- Mokrovraty (589)
- Pouště (246)

== Etymology ==
The name is derived from the Czech words mokro ('wet') and vracet ('to return'). The name arose because of the location of the village near the Brdy hills. These often caused the wind to turn and the rain to return to the village. The name of the village Poustě (literally 'deserts') also arose because of meteorological phenomena.

== Geography ==
Mokrovraty is located about 21 kilometres (13 mi) northeast of Příbram and 29 km (18 mi) south of Prague. It lies in the Benešov Uplands. The highest point is the hill Králova stolice at 413 m (1,355 ft) above sea level. The Kocába River flows through the southern part of the municipality.

== History ==
The first written mention of Mokrovraty is from 1304. Almost nothing has been preserved about the history of the village. From its inception until the establishment of a sovereign municipality in 1848, Mokrovraty belonged to the Dobříš estate.

== Demographics ==
Historical population

Year	Pop.	±%
1869	429	—
1880	454	+5.8%
1890	476	+4.8%
1900	476	+0.0%
1910	511	+7.4%

Year	Pop.	±%
1921	488	−4.5%
1930	490	+0.4%
1950	508	+3.7%
1961	497	−2.2%
1970	481	−3.2%

Year	Pop.	±%
1980	521	+8.3%
1991	544	+4.4%
2001	558	+2.6%
2011	725	+29.9%
2021	835	+15.2%

Source: Censuses

== Transport ==
The D4 motorway from Prague to Písek runs along the western municipal border.

Mokrovraty is located on the railway line Prague–Dobříš.

== Sights ==
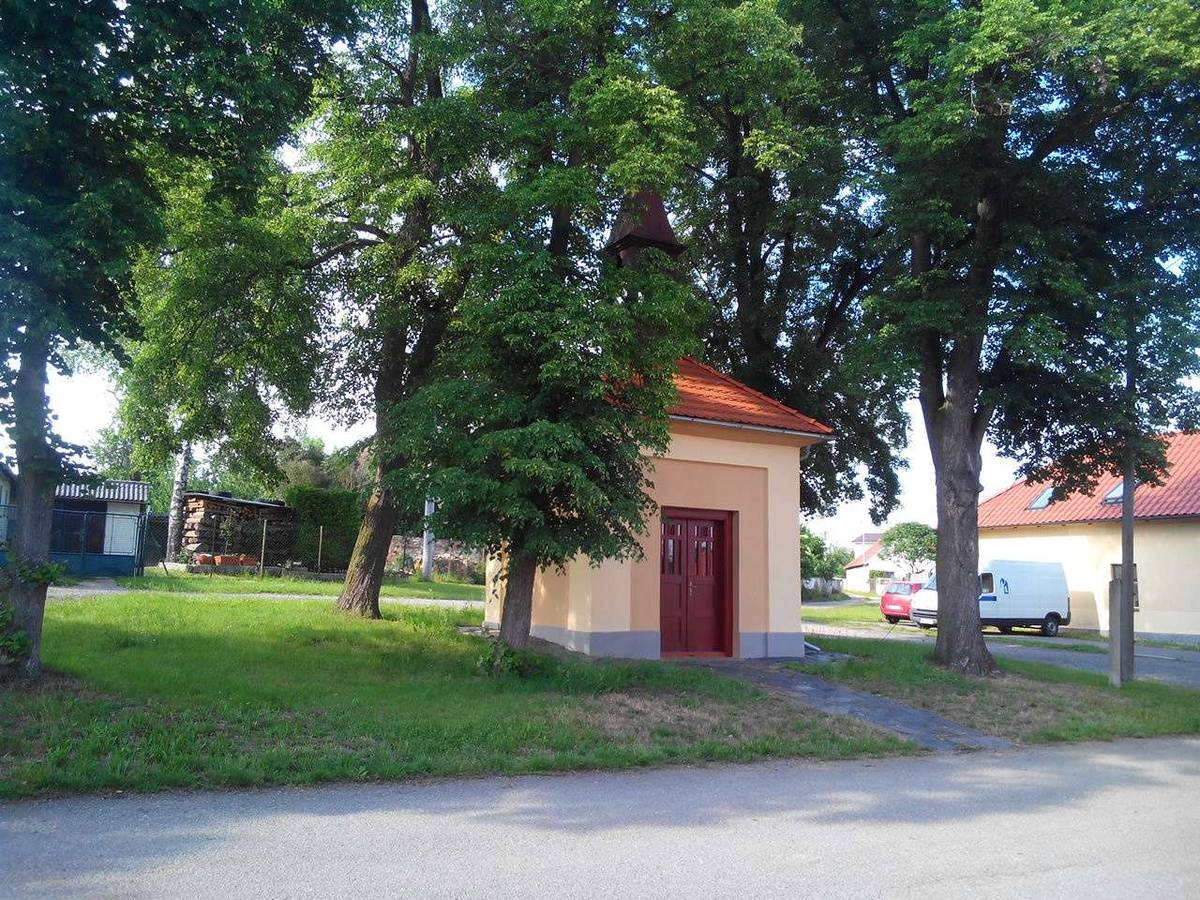
Chapel of Saint Wenceslaus

There are no protected cultural monuments in the municipality. Among the landmarks are the Chapel of Saint Wenceslaus in Mokrovraty and the Chapel of Saint John the Baptist in Pouště.
