= Libice =

Libice may refer to places in the Czech Republic:

- Libice nad Cidlinou, a municipality and village in the Central Bohemian Region
- Libice nad Doubravou, a market town in the Vysočina Region
- Libice, a village and part of Rybníky (Příbram District) in the Central Bohemian Region
