= Rybníky (Příbram District) =

- Municipality
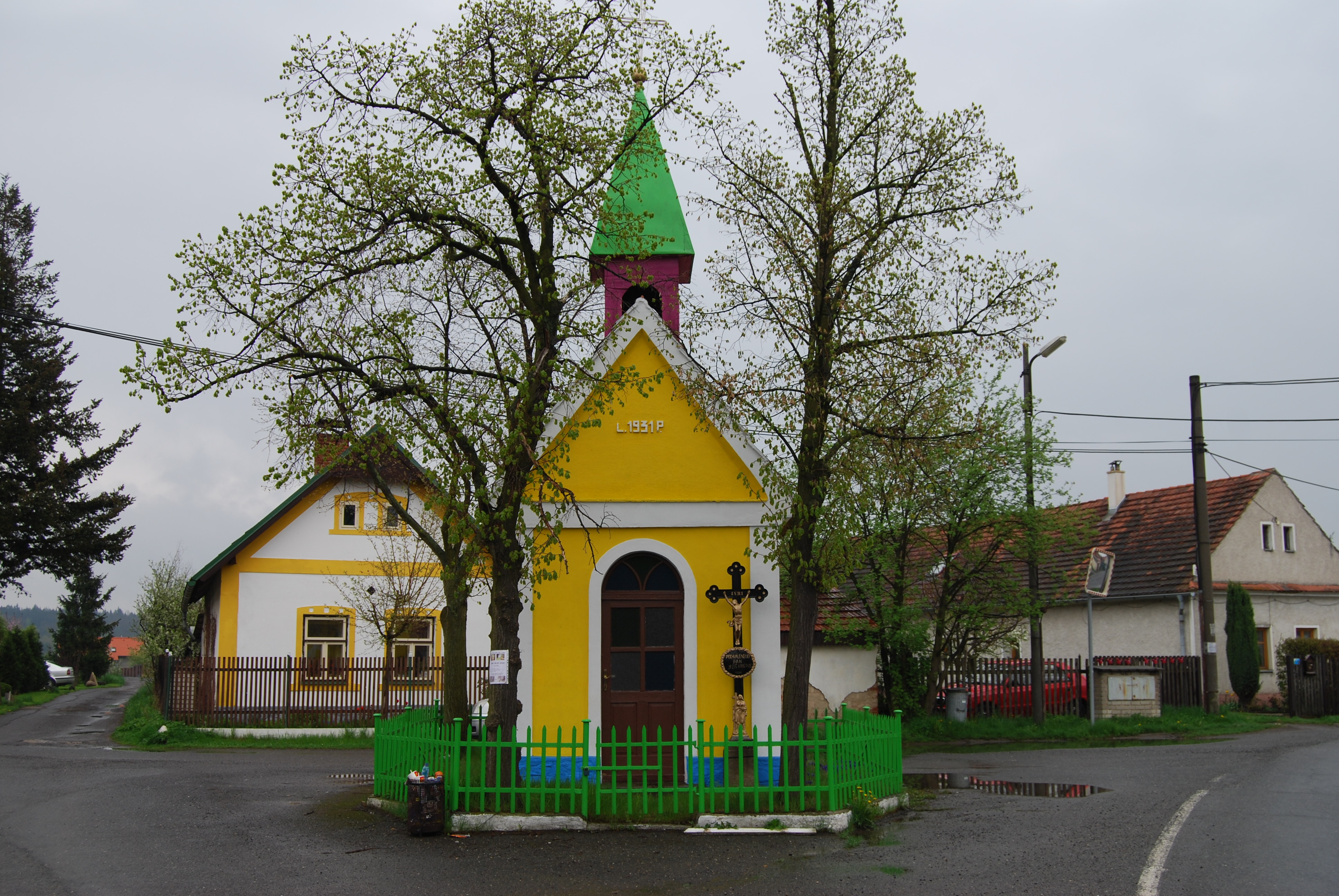
- Chapel of Saint John of Nepomuk

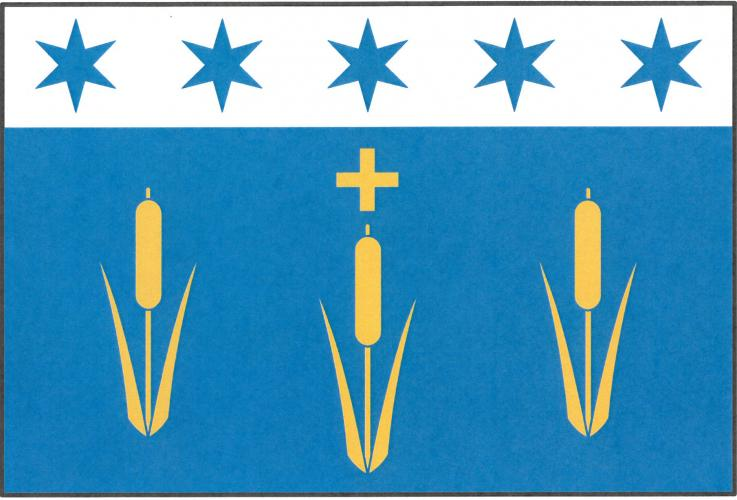
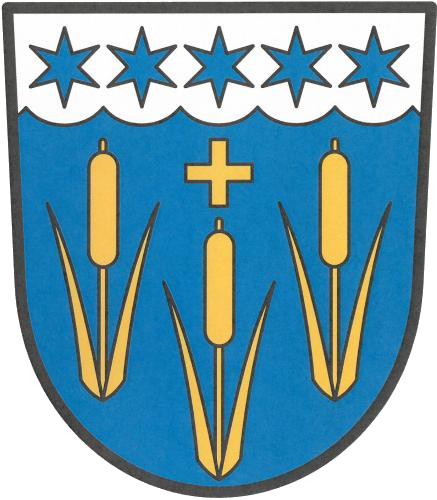
- Flag Coat of arms

- Location in the Czech Republic
- Coordinates: 49°45′10″N 14°12′21″E
- Country: Czech Republic
- Region: Central Bohemian
- District: Příbram
- First mentioned: 1603

Area
  - Total: 5.65 km^{2} (2.18 sq mi)
- Elevation: 337 m (1,106 ft)

Population (2026-01-01)
  - Total: 478
  - Density: 84.6/km^{2} (219/sq mi)
- Time zone: UTC+1 (CET)
  - Summer (DST): UTC+2 (CEST)
- Postal code: 263 01
- Website: rybniky.net

Rybníky is a municipality and village in Příbram District in the Central Bohemian Region of the Czech Republic. It has about 500 inhabitants.

== Administrative division ==
Rybníky consists of three municipal parts (in brackets population according to the 2021 census):

- Rybníky (319)
- Budín (85)
- Libice (54)

== Etymology ==
The name literally means 'fishponds' in Czech.

== Geography ==
Rybníky is located about 16 kilometres (10 mi) northeast of Příbram and 35 km (22 mi) southwest of Prague. It lies in the Benešov Uplands. The highest point is the hill Kozinec at 457 m (1,499 ft) above sea level. The Kocába River flows through the municipality.

== History ==
The first written mention of Rybníky is from 1603. From its establishment, it belonged to the Dobříš estate and after the independent municipalities were established, it remained a municipal part of Dobříš. In 1899, Rybníky became a separate municipality.

== Demographics ==
Historical population

Year	Pop.	±%
1869	438	—
1880	461	+5.3%
1890	462	+0.2%
1900	453	−1.9%
1910	451	−0.4%

Year	Pop.	±%
1921	423	−6.2%
1930	388	−8.3%
1950	250	−35.6%
1961	243	−2.8%
1970	244	+0.4%

Year	Pop.	±%
1980	259	+6.1%
1991	260	+0.4%
2001	270	+3.8%
2011	374	+38.5%
2021	458	+22.5%

Source: Censuses

== Transport ==
There are no railways or major roads passing through the municipality.

== Sights ==
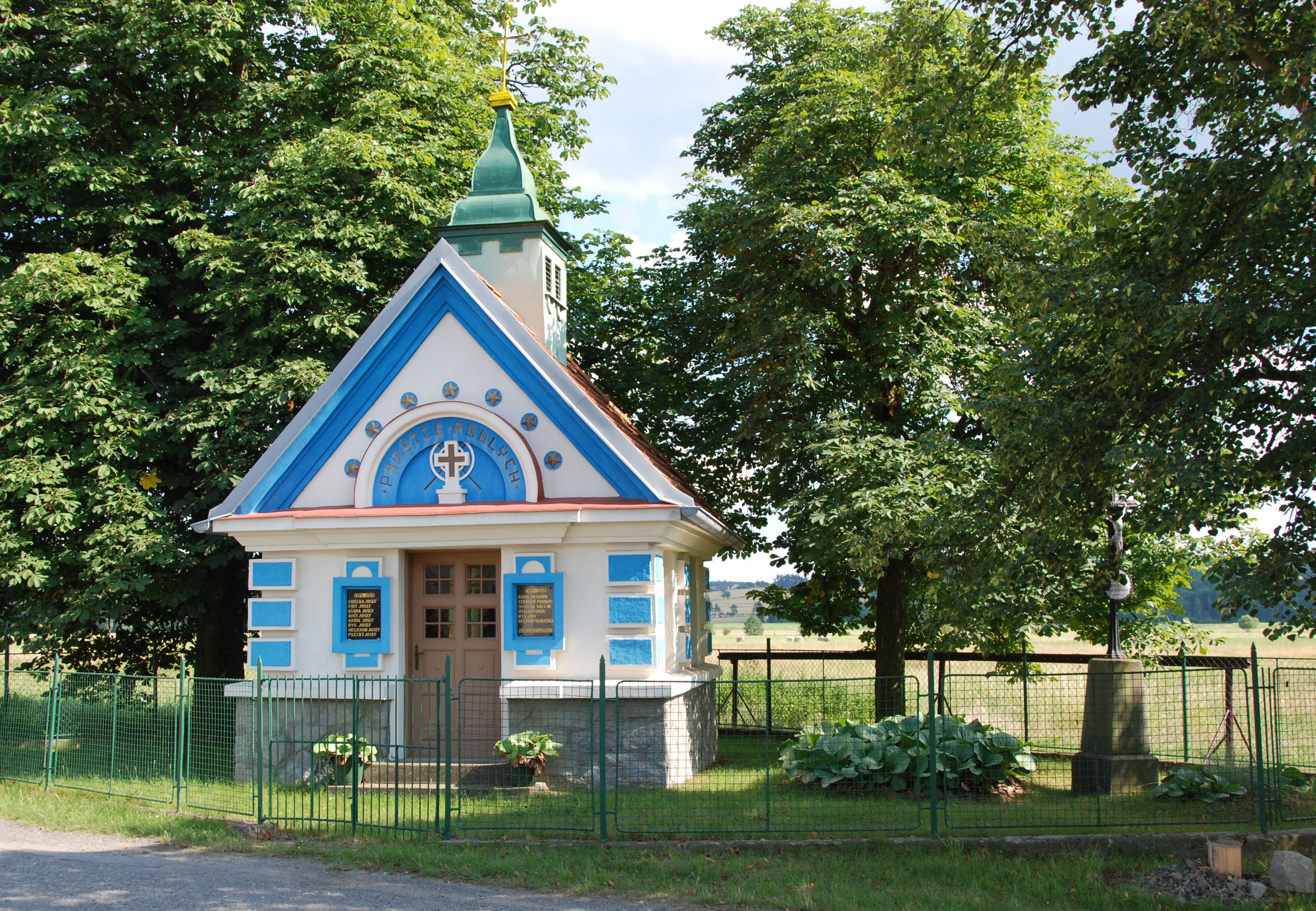
Chapel of the Assumption of the Virgin Mary

The only protected cultural monument in the municipality is the Chapel of the Assumption of the Virgin Mary. It is located west of the Rybníky village, at the municipal border. It was built in 1923, originally as a memorial to the fallen in World War I. It is a rare example of a Rondocubist building in the Czech countryside.

Among the landmarks in the village of Rybníky are the Evangelical church from 1847, and the Chapel of Saint John of Nepomuk from 1931.
