= Nový Knín =

- Town
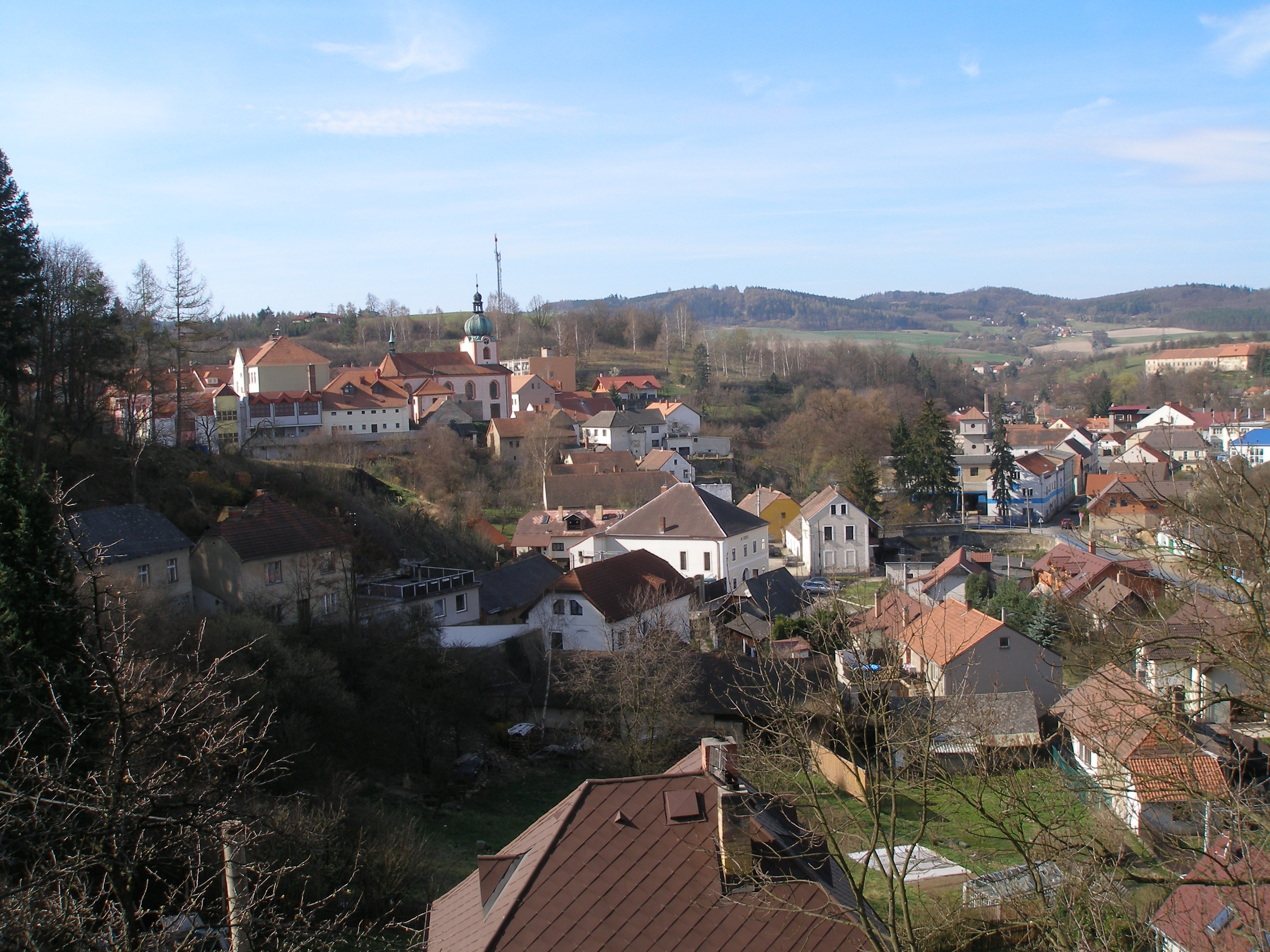
- View from the northeast

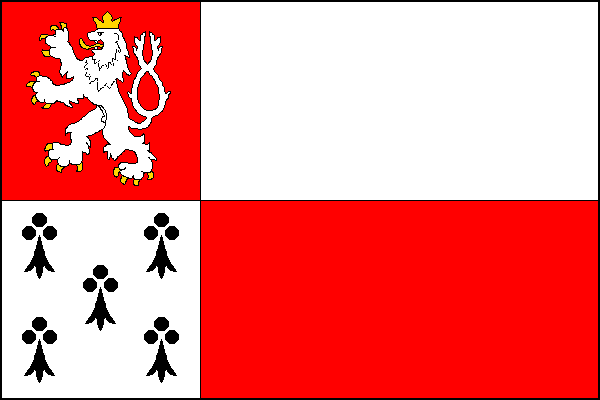
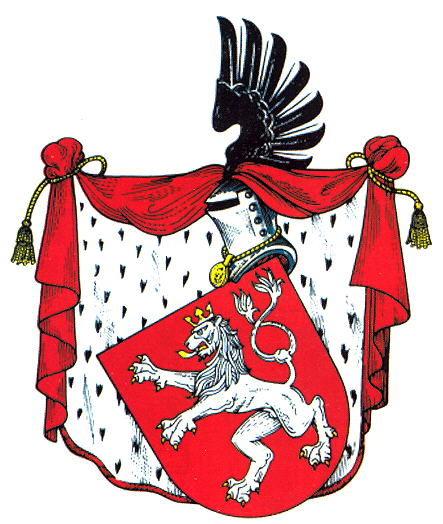
- Flag Coat of arms

- Location in the Czech Republic
- Coordinates: 49°47′17″N 14°17′37″E
- Country: Czech Republic
- Region: Central Bohemian
- District: Příbram
- First mentioned: 1186

Government
  - Mayor: Radek Hrubý

Area
  - Total: 29.62 km^{2} (11.44 sq mi)
- Elevation: 307 m (1,007 ft)

Population (2026-01-01)
  - Total: 2,156
  - Density: 72.79/km^{2} (188.5/sq mi)
- Time zone: UTC+1 (CET)
  - Summer (DST): UTC+2 (CEST)
- Postal code: 262 03
- Website: www.mestonovyknin.cz

Nový Knín (Czech pronunciation: [ˈnoviː ˈkɲiːn]) is a town in Příbram District in the Central Bohemian Region of the Czech Republic. It has about 2,200 inhabitants. The town is located on the Kocába River in the Benešov Uplands.

Nový Knín is known for gold mining, which took place here in the Middle Ages and has been restored to a lesser extent several times. Today the town is home to the Museum of Gold. The historic town centre is well preserved and is protected as an urban monument zone. The main landmark of Nový Knín is the Church of Saint Nicholas.

== Administrative division ==
Nový Knín consists of five municipal parts (in brackets population according to the 2021 census):

- Nový Knín (1,321)
- Chramiště (31)
- Kozí Hory (82)
- Libčice (206)
- Sudovice (367)

== Etymology ==
The initial name of the settlement was probably Kněnín and was derived from the Czech word kněžna (i.e. 'princess'). The form was then shortened to Knín. Two settlements were originally distinguished – Starý Knín ('old Knín') and Nový Knín ('new Knín'), but they gradually merged.

== Geography ==
Nový Knín is located about 23 kilometres (14 mi) northeast of Příbram and 25 km (16 mi) south of Prague. It lies in the Benešov Uplands. The highest point is the hill Besídka at 516 m (1,693 ft) above sea level. The Kocába River flows through the town.

== History ==
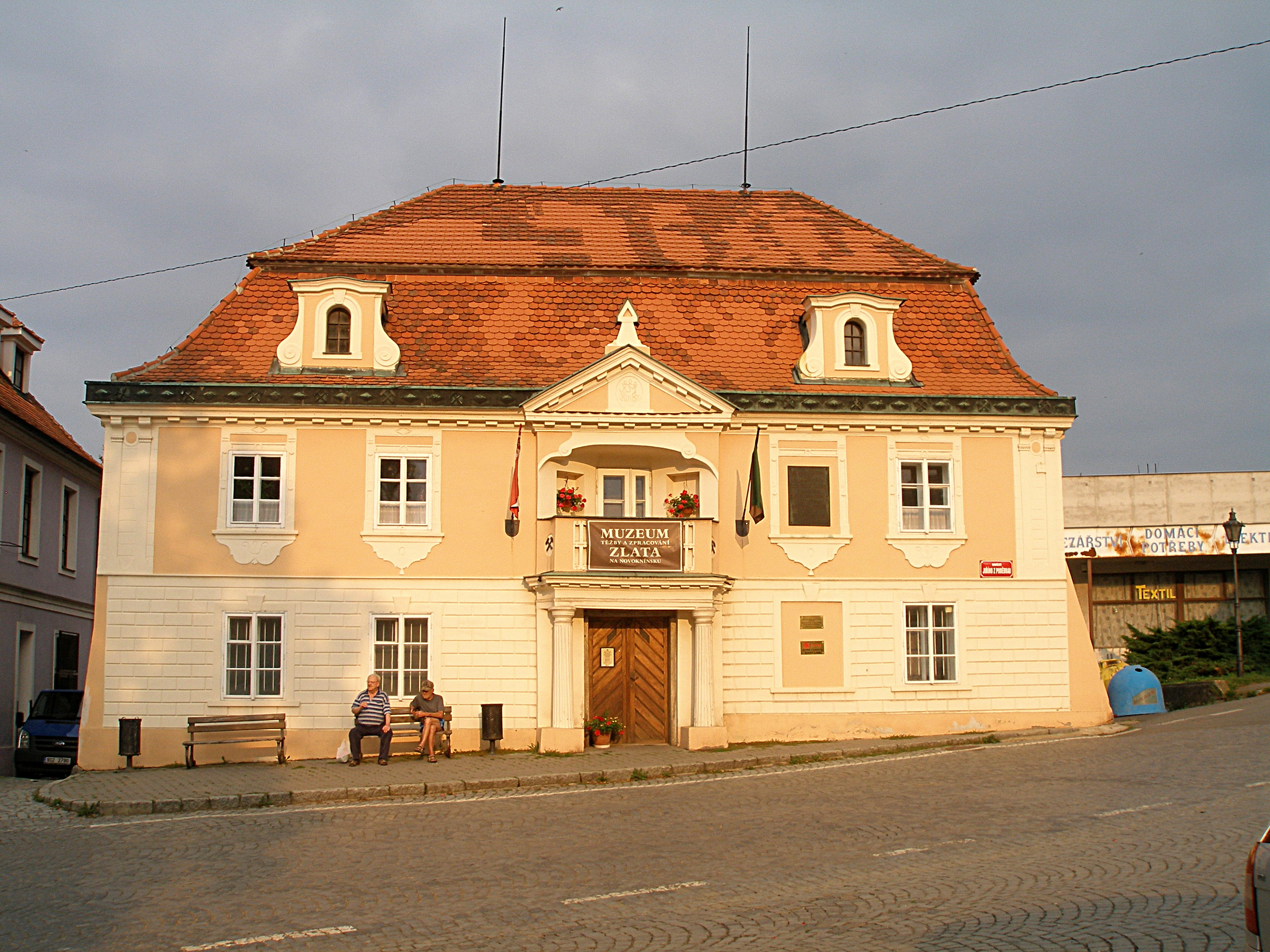
Mincovna with the Museum of Gold

The first written mention of Nový Knín is from 1186, when members of the Přemyslid dynasty, dukes Frederick and Conrad II agreed and signed here the final annexation of Moravia to Bohemia. In the 14th century, Nový Knín became the centre of gold mining in the area and became a prospering mining town. A school, brewery and vineyard were established here. Gold mining was suspended during the Hussite Wars. It was later renewed several times, but always on a significantly smaller scale than in the 14th century.

== Demographics ==
Historical population

Year	Pop.	±%
1869	2,419	—
1880	2,487	+2.8%
1890	2,401	−3.5%
1900	2,327	−3.1%
1910	2,381	+2.3%

Year	Pop.	±%
1921	2,336	−1.9%
1930	2,237	−4.2%
1950	1,780	−20.4%
1961	1,945	+9.3%
1970	1,917	−1.4%

Year	Pop.	±%
1980	1,867	−2.6%
1991	1,716	−8.1%
2001	1,731	+0.9%
2011	1,952	+12.8%
2021	2,007	+2.8%

Source: Censuses

== Transport ==
There are no railways or major roads passing through the municipality.

== Sights ==
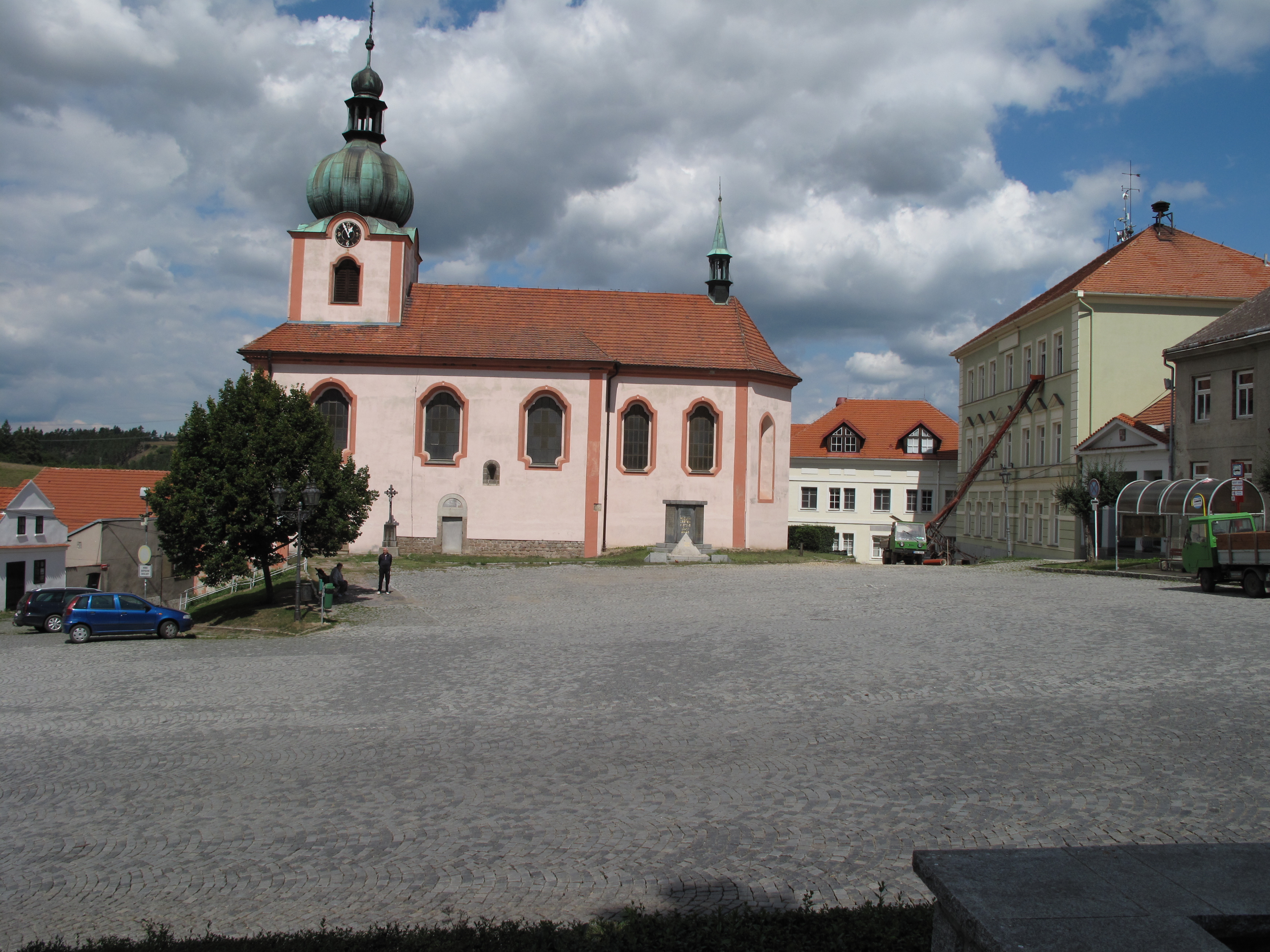
Church of Saint Nicholas

The main landmark of Nový Knín is the Church of Saint Nicholas. It was originally a Romanesque church from the second half of the 12th century, first documented in 1186. In 1773–1774, it was rebuilt in the Baroque style, but several Romanesque elements have been preserved.

The so-called Mincovna (meaning 'mint') is a historic Renaissance building from the 16th century, with an Empire façade from 1810. The building is linked to gold mining in the region. It originally served as the seat of a royal official, today it houses the Museum of Gold.

== Twin towns – sister cities ==
Nový Knín is twinned with:

- Ledro, Italy
