= Štěchovice =

- Market town
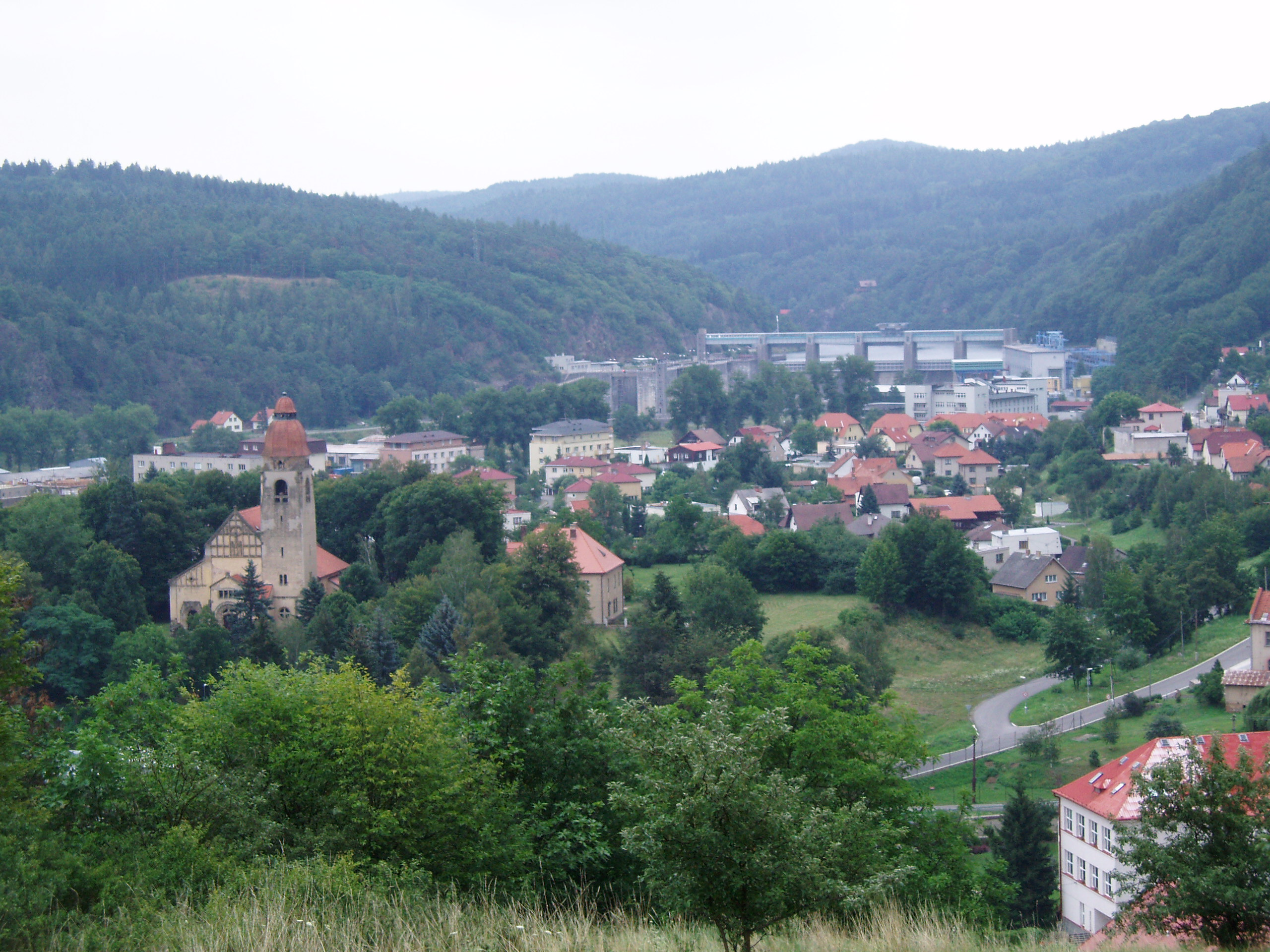
- View from the north

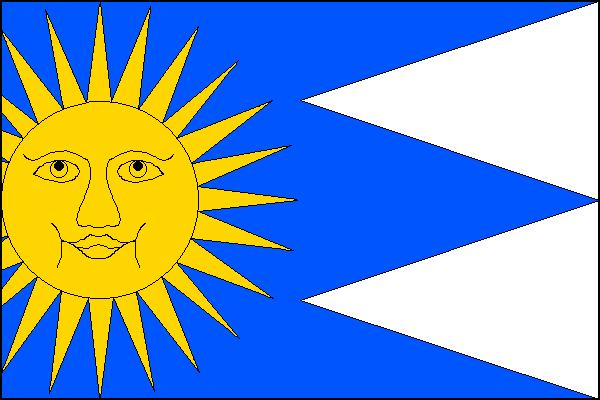
- Flag Coat of arms

- Location in the Czech Republic
- Coordinates: 49°51′4″N 14°24′20″E
- Country: Czech Republic
- Region: Central Bohemian
- District: Prague-West
- First mentioned: 1205

Area
  - Total: 14.30 km^{2} (5.52 sq mi)
- Elevation: 215 m (705 ft)

Population (2026-01-01)
  - Total: 2,208
  - Density: 154.4/km^{2} (399.9/sq mi)
- Time zone: UTC+1 (CET)
  - Summer (DST): UTC+2 (CEST)
- Postal codes: 252 07, 252 08
- Website: www.stechovice.info

Štěchovice (Czech pronunciation: [ˈʃcɛxovɪtsɛ]) is a market town in Prague-West District in the Central Bohemian Region of the Czech Republic. It has about 2,200 inhabitants.

== Administrative division ==
Štěchovice consists of three municipal parts (in brackets population according to the 2021 census):

- Štěchovice (1,221)
- Masečín (733)
- Třebenice (221)

== Etymology ==
The name was derived from the personal name Štěch, meaning "the village of Štěch's people". Štěch used to be a shortened form of the name Štěpán.

== Geography ==
Štěchovice is located about 18 kilometres (11 mi) south of Prague. It lies in the Benešov Uplands. The highest point is at 467 m (1,532 ft) above sea level. The market town is situated on the left bank of the Vltava River, at its confluence with the Kocába River. The Vltava and the Štěchovice Reservoir, built on the river in 1937–1945, form the eastern municipal border.

== History ==
The first written mention of Štěchovice is in a deed of King Ottokar I of Bohemia from 1205. Třebenice was first mentioned in 1055 and Masečín in 1310. For centuries, Štěchovice was divided into several parts, which belonged to different estates with different owners. In the 14th century, there were gold mines in the area, thanks to which the growth of the village accelerated. In 1437, Štěchovice was first referred to as a market town. Gold mining ended during the Thirty Years' War, and the livelihood of the inhabitants shifted to the use of the Vltava River for transport.

== Demographics ==
Historical population

Year	Pop.	±%
1869	1,079	—
1880	1,061	−1.7%
1890	1,038	−2.2%
1900	978	−5.8%
1910	970	−0.8%

Year	Pop.	±%
1921	890	−8.2%
1930	1,054	+18.4%
1950	1,757	+66.7%
1961	1,743	−0.8%
1970	1,506	−13.6%

Year	Pop.	±%
1980	1,465	−2.7%
1991	1,345	−8.2%
2001	1,318	−2.0%
2011	1,741	+32.1%
2021	2,175	+24.9%

Source: Censuses

== Transport ==
There are no railways or major roads passing through the municipality.

== Sights ==
The main landmark of Štěchovice is the Church of Saint John the Baptist. It was built mainly in the Art Nouveau style in 1911–1913 and belongs to the most important Czech sacral buildings of the 20th century. Prominent artists, such as Vojtěch Sucharda or Čeněk Vosmík, participated in the sculptural decoration of the church.

== Notable people ==
- Zorka Janů (1921–1946), actress

== Twin towns – sister cities ==
Štěchovice is twinned with:

- Kalmthout, Belgium
- San Juan Nepomuceno, Paraguay
