= Dubno (Příbram District) =

- Municipality
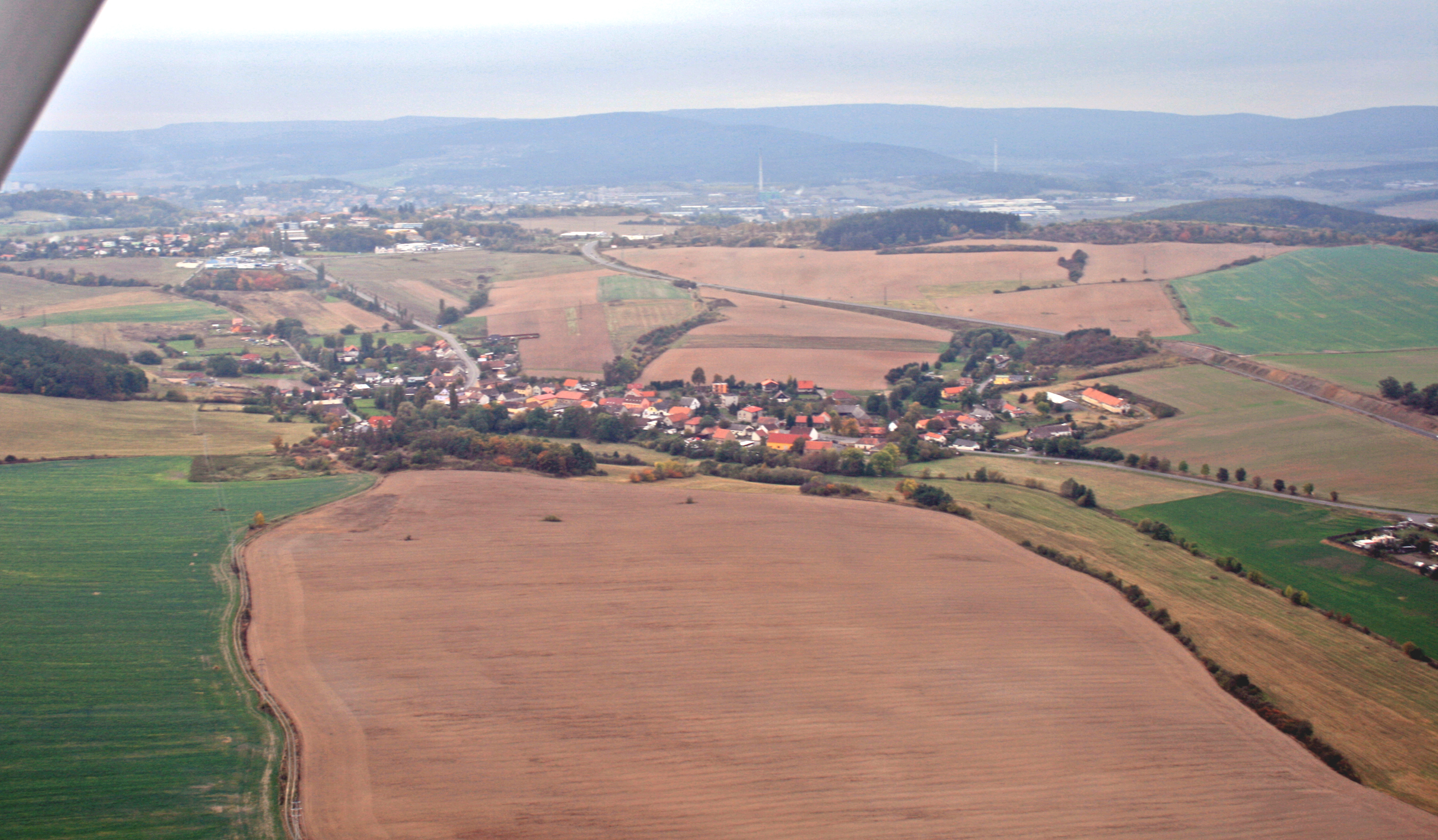
- Aerial view

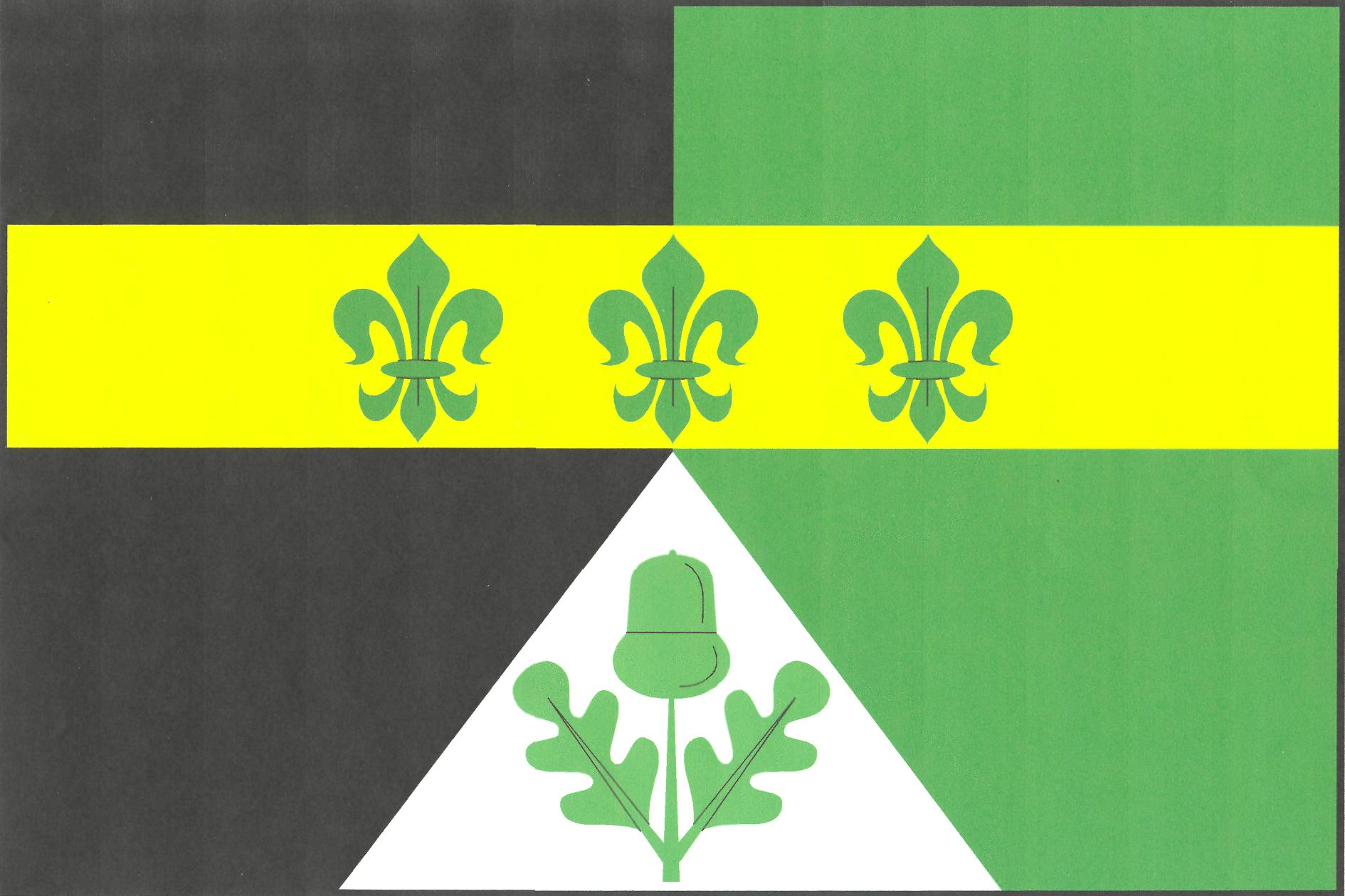
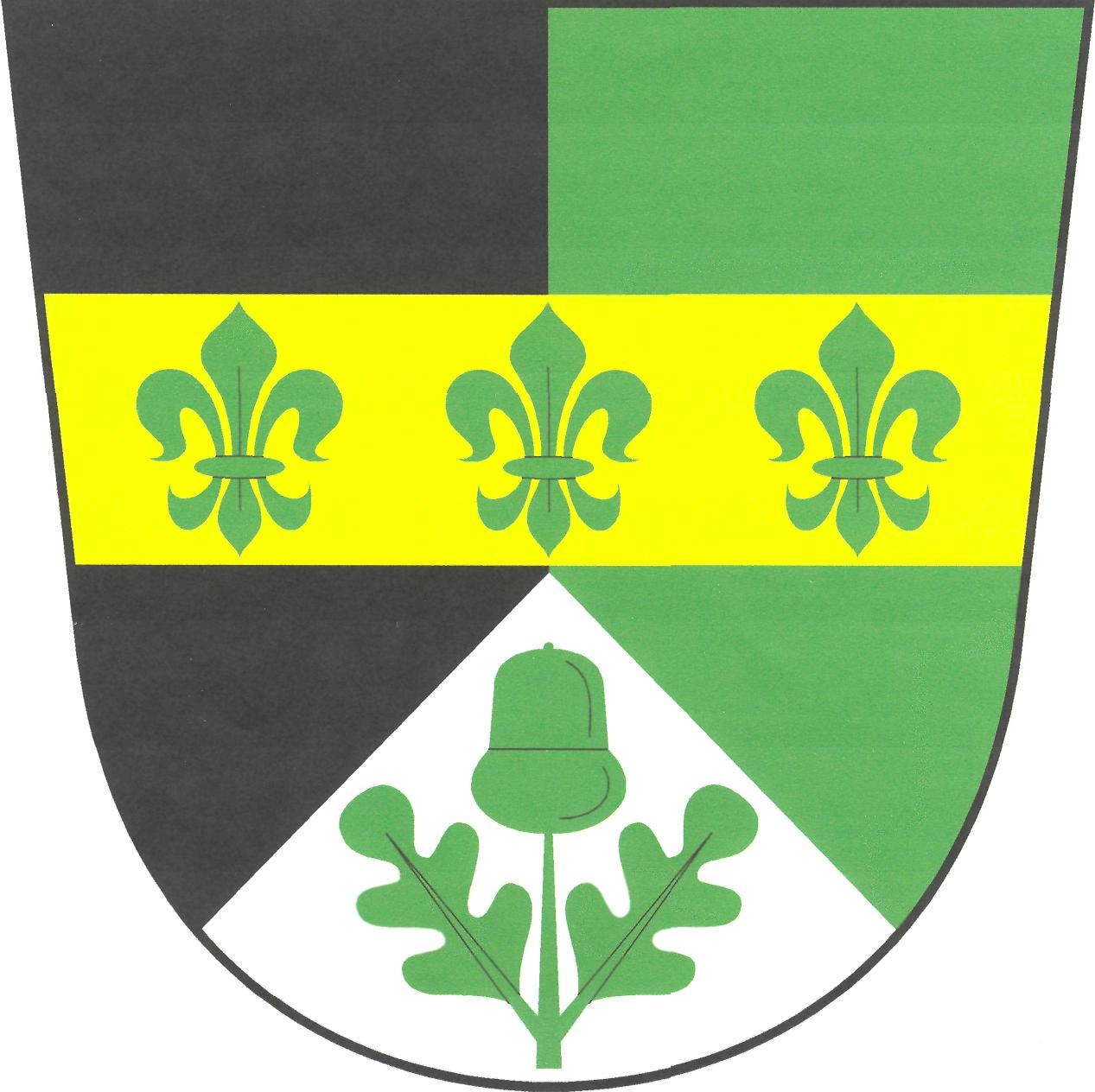
- Flag Coat of arms

- Location in the Czech Republic
- Coordinates: 49°41′45″N 14°3′6″E
- Country: Czech Republic
- Region: Central Bohemian
- District: Příbram
- First mentioned: 1298

Area
  - Total: 5.99 km^{2} (2.31 sq mi)
- Elevation: 574 m (1,883 ft)

Population (2026-01-01)
  - Total: 373
  - Density: 62.3/km^{2} (161/sq mi)
- Time zone: UTC+1 (CET)
  - Summer (DST): UTC+2 (CEST)
- Postal code: 261 01
- Website: www.obecdubno.cz

Dubno is a municipality and village in Příbram District in the Central Bohemian Region of the Czech Republic. It has about 400 inhabitants. The Kocába River originates in the municipality.

== Demographics ==
Historical population
Year	Pop.	±%
1869	485	—
1880	509	+4.9%
1890	638	+25.3%
1900	766	+20.1%
1910	750	−2.1%
1921	620	−17.3%
1930	597	−3.7%
1950	505	−15.4%
1961	264	−47.7%
1970	239	−9.5%
1980	243	+1.7%
1991	209	−14.0%
2001	253	+21.1%
2011	276	+9.1%
2021	352	+27.5%
Source: Censuses
