= Daleké Dušníky =

- Municipality
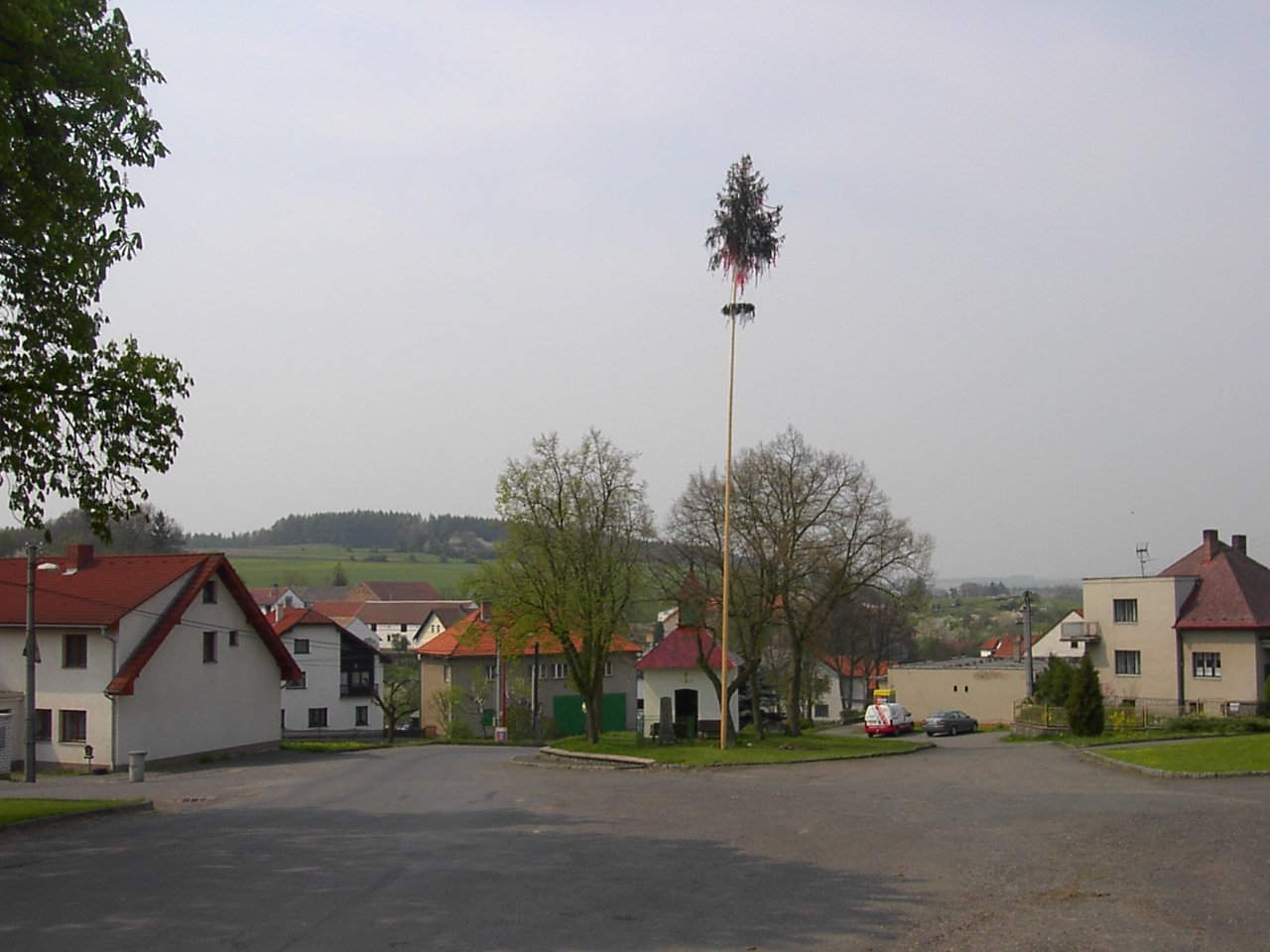
- Centre of Daleké Dušníky

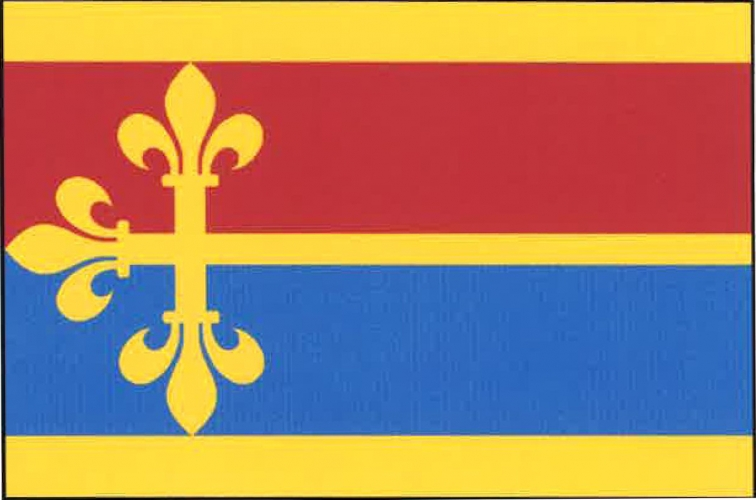
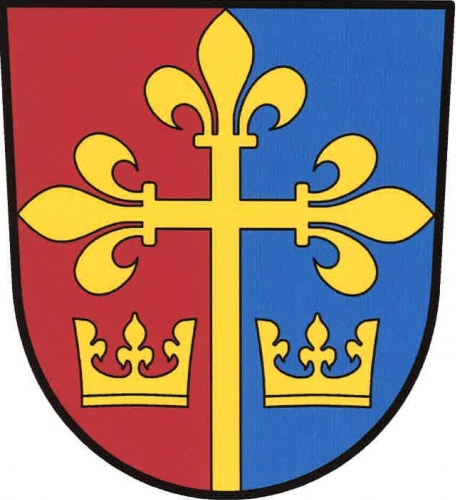
- Flag Coat of arms

- Location in the Czech Republic
- Coordinates: 49°43′39″N 14°11′12″E
- Country: Czech Republic
- Region: Central Bohemian
- District: Příbram
- First mentioned: 1357

Area
  - Total: 6.82 km^{2} (2.63 sq mi)
- Elevation: 400 m (1,300 ft)

Population (2026-01-01)
  - Total: 443
  - Density: 65.0/km^{2} (168/sq mi)
- Time zone: UTC+1 (CET)
  - Summer (DST): UTC+2 (CEST)
- Postal code: 263 01
- Website: www.dalekedusniky.cz

Daleké Dušníky is a municipality and village in Příbram District in the Central Bohemian Region of the Czech Republic. It has about 400 inhabitants.

== Administrative division ==
Daleké Dušníky consists of two municipal parts (in brackets population according to the 2021 census):

- Daleké Dušníky (270)
- Druhlice (158)

== Demographics ==
Historical population
Year	Pop.	±%
1869	534	—
1880	582	+9.0%
1890	588	+1.0%
1900	594	+1.0%
1910	614	+3.4%
1921	595	−3.1%
1930	625	+5.0%
1950	470	−24.8%
1961	467	−0.6%
1970	415	−11.1%
1980	426	+2.7%
1991	402	−5.6%
2001	398	−1.0%
2011	390	−2.0%
2021	428	+9.7%
Source: Censuses
