= Drásov (Příbram District) =

- Municipality
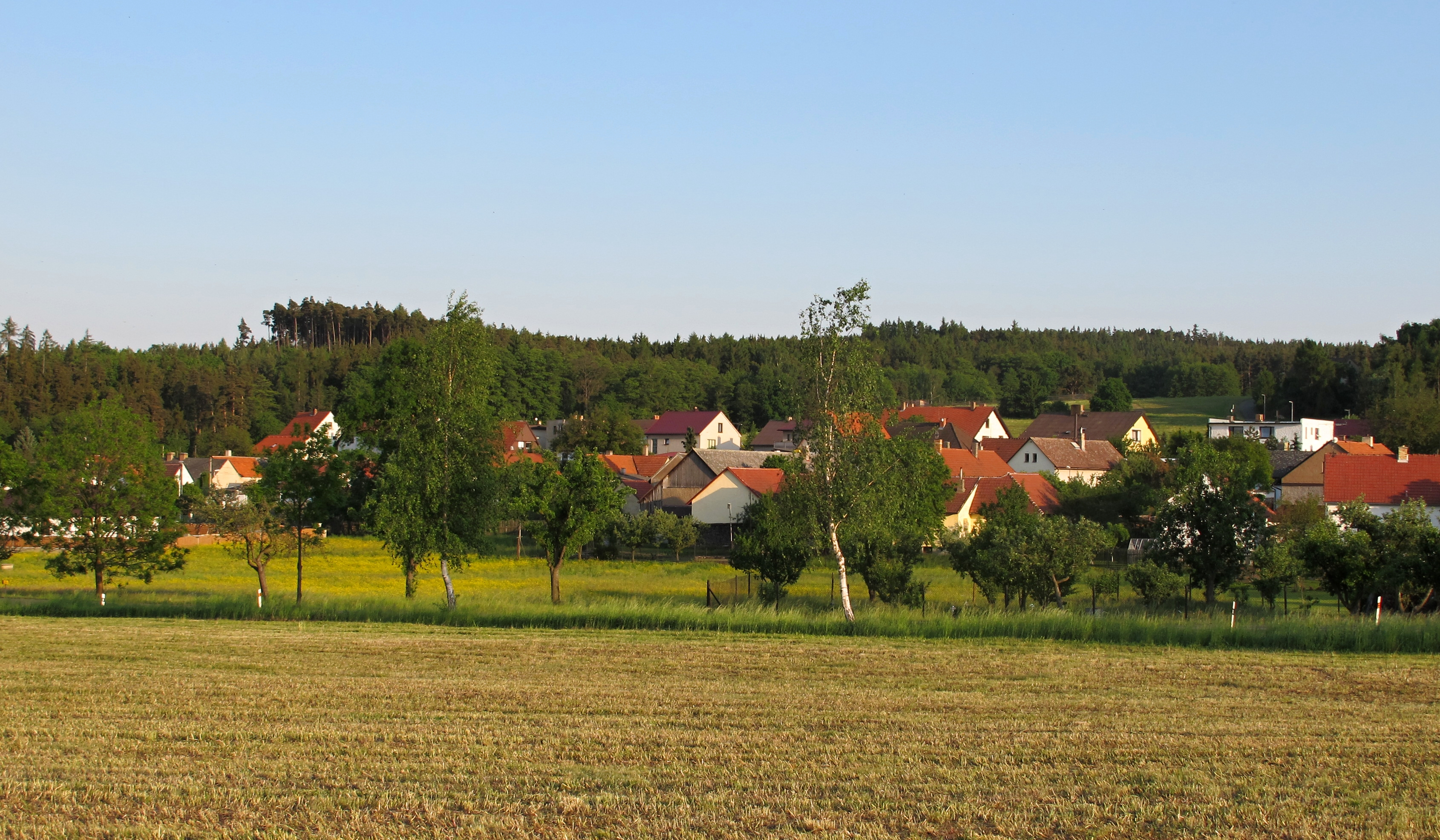
- Eastern part of Drásov

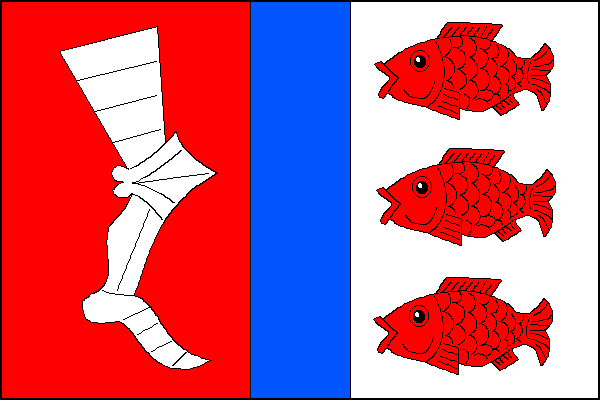
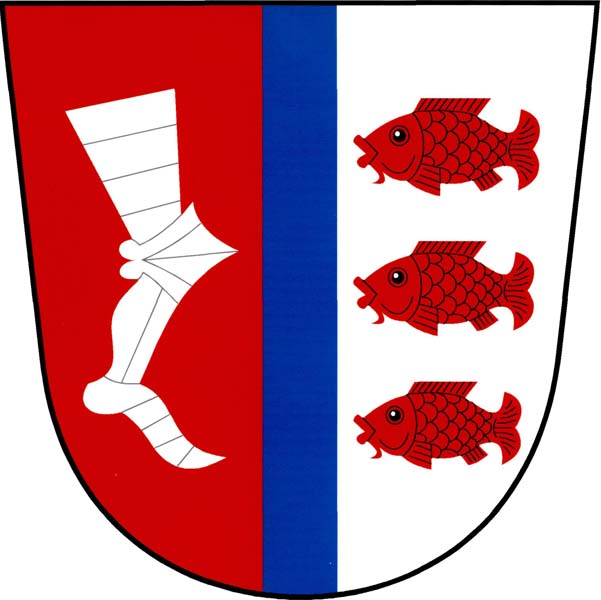
- Flag Coat of arms

- Location in the Czech Republic
- Coordinates: 49°42′8″N 14°7′4″E
- Country: Czech Republic
- Region: Central Bohemian
- District: Příbram
- First mentioned: 1057

Area
  - Total: 5.47 km^{2} (2.11 sq mi)
- Elevation: 434 m (1,424 ft)

Population (2026-01-01)
  - Total: 436
  - Density: 79.7/km^{2} (206/sq mi)
- Time zone: UTC+1 (CET)
  - Summer (DST): UTC+2 (CEST)
- Postal code: 261 01
- Website: www.drasov.eu

Drásov is a municipality and village in Příbram District in the Central Bohemian Region of the Czech Republic. It has about 400 inhabitants.

== Administrative division ==
Drásov consists of two municipal parts (in brackets population according to the 2021 census):

- Drásov (348)
- Skalka (84)

== Etymology ==
The initial name of the village was Drasovice. It was derived from the personal name Drás, meaning "the village of Drás' people". The shortened name Drásov appeared first in the 17th century.

== Geography ==
Drásov is located about 7 kilometres (4 mi) east of Příbram and 40 km (25 mi) southwest of Prague. It lies on the border between the Benešov Uplands and Brdy Highlands. The highest point is the hill Velký Chlum at 481 m (1,578 ft) above sea level. The upper course of the Kocába River flows through the municipality and supplies a system of several fishponds there.

== History ==
The first written mention of Drásov is from 1057.

== Demographics ==
Historical population

Year	Pop.	±%
1869	572	—
1880	516	−9.8%
1890	570	+10.5%
1900	589	+3.3%
1910	512	−13.1%

Year	Pop.	±%
1921	500	−2.3%
1930	458	−8.4%
1950	346	−24.5%
1961	381	+10.1%
1970	386	+1.3%

Year	Pop.	±%
1980	336	−13.0%
1991	340	+1.2%
2001	363	+6.8%
2011	403	+11.0%
2021	432	+7.2%

Source: Censuses

== Transport ==
The D4 motorway from Prague to Písek runs through the municipality.

== Sights ==
There are no protected cultural monuments in the municipality. The most notable building is the Chapel of Saint Wenceslaus.
