= Bojanovice (Prague-West District) =

- Municipality
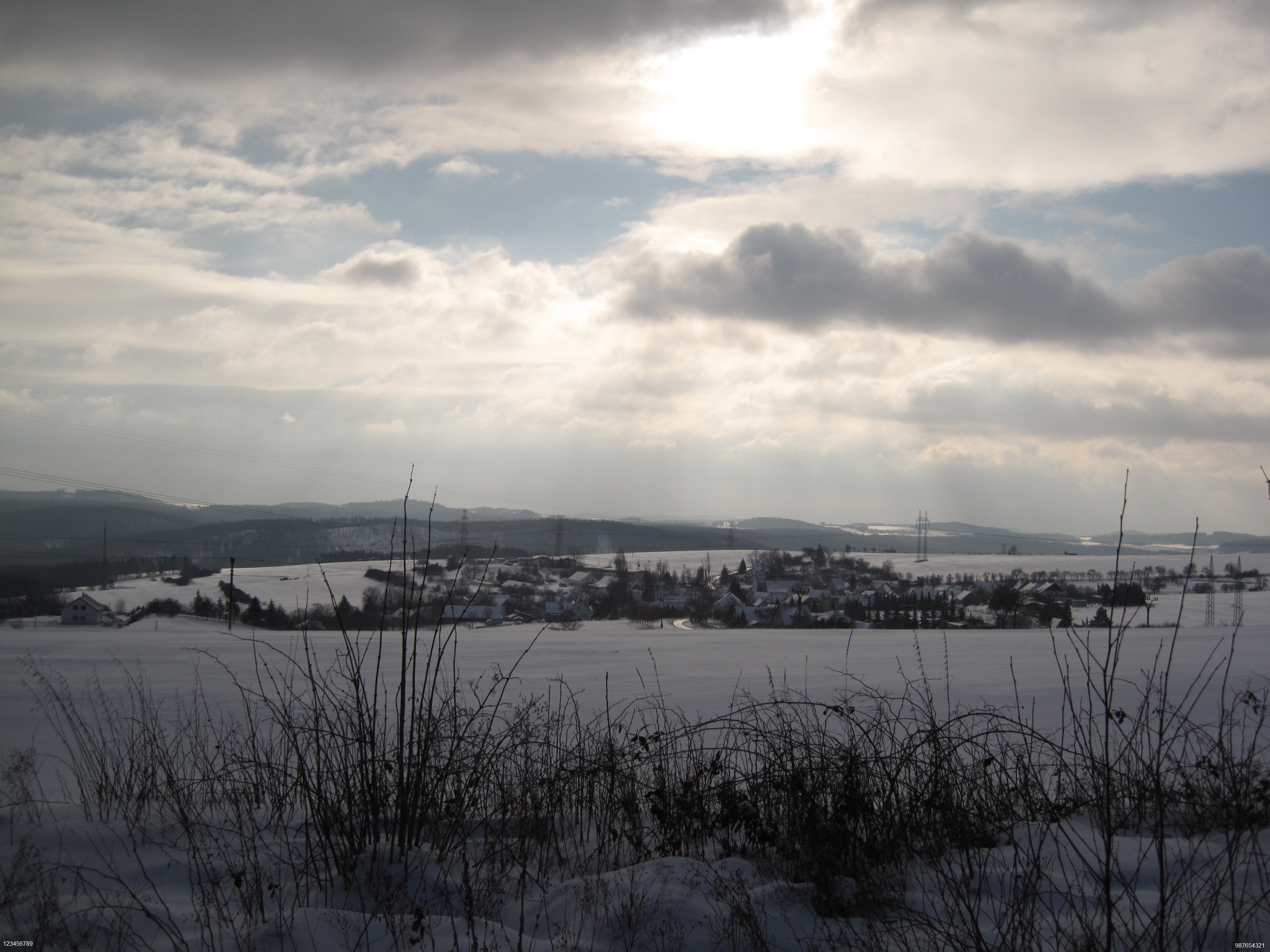
- General view

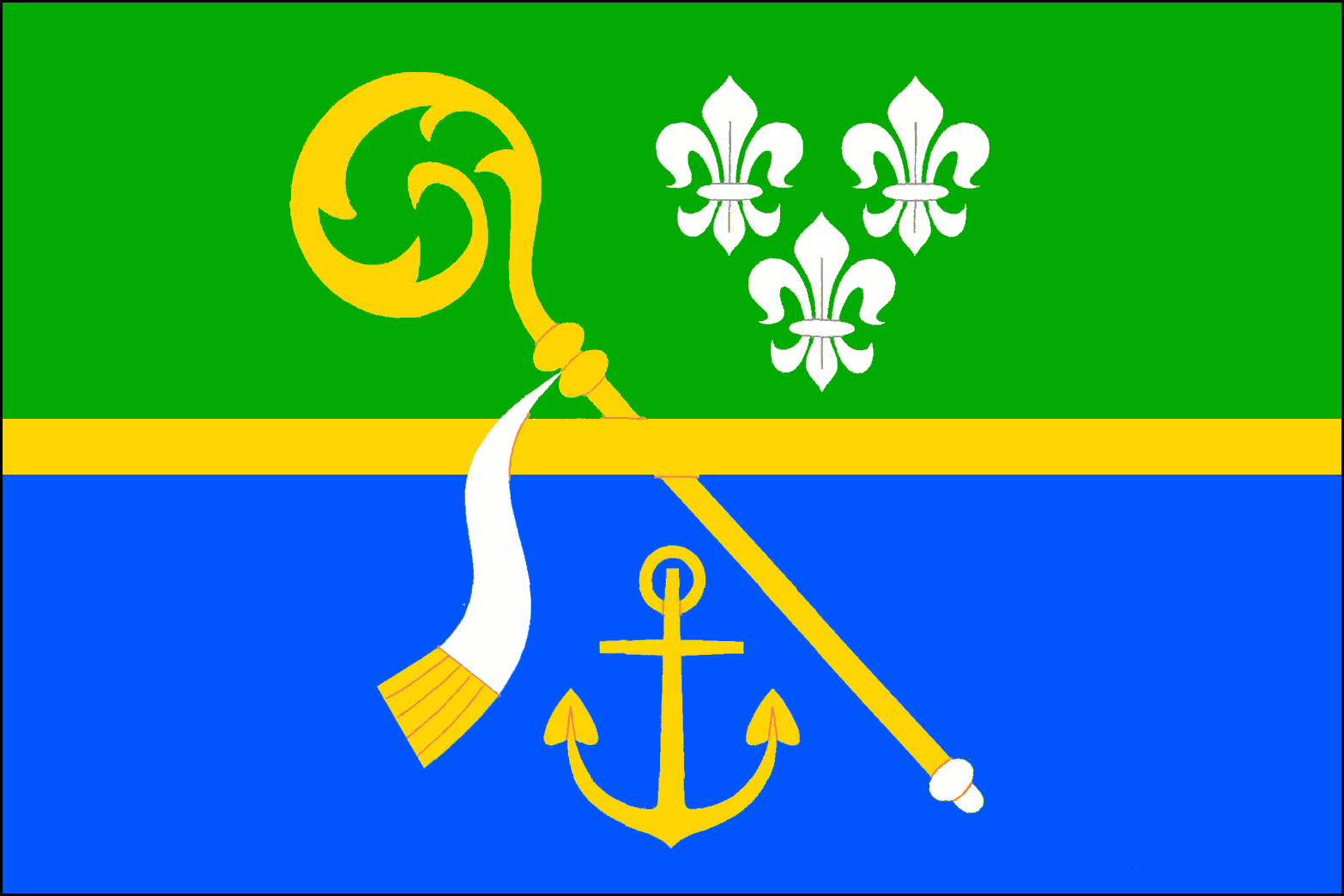
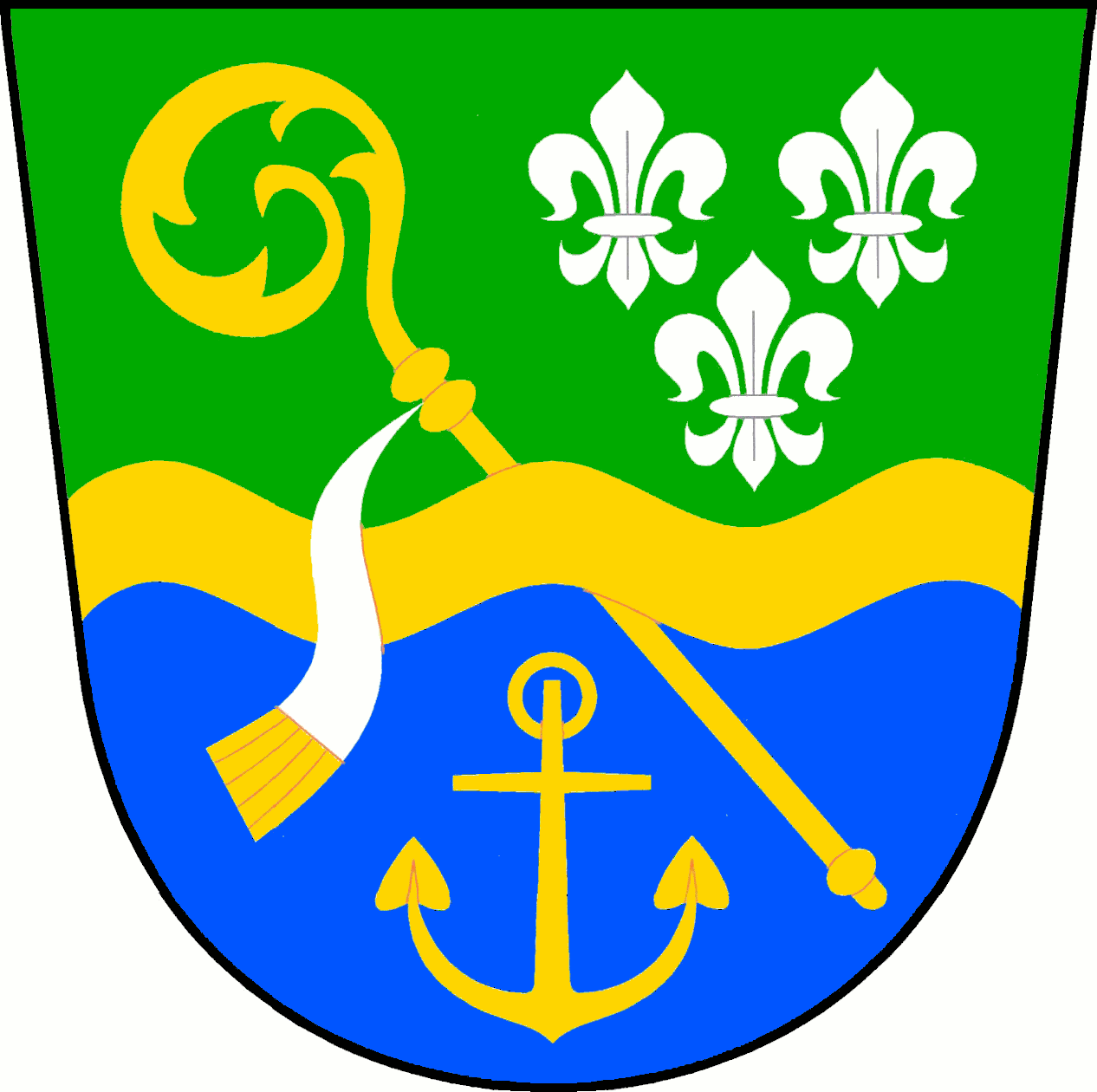
- Flag Coat of arms

- Location in the Czech Republic
- Coordinates: 49°51′16″N 14°21′8″E
- Country: Czech Republic
- Region: Central Bohemian
- District: Prague-West
- First mentioned: 1107

Area
  - Total: 10.90 km^{2} (4.21 sq mi)
- Elevation: 355 m (1,165 ft)

Population (2026-01-01)
  - Total: 495
  - Density: 45.4/km^{2} (118/sq mi)
- Time zone: UTC+1 (CET)
  - Summer (DST): UTC+2 (CEST)
- Postal code: 252 06
- Website: bojanovice.cz

Bojanovice is a municipality and village in Prague-West District in the Central Bohemian Region of the Czech Republic. It has about 500 inhabitants.

== Administrative division ==
Bojanovice consists of three municipal parts (in brackets population according to the 2021 census):

- Bojanovice (319)
- Malá Lečice (134)
- Senešnice (70)

Malá Lečice and Senešnice form an exclave of the municipal territory.

== Demographics ==
Historical population
Year	Pop.	±%
1869	667	—
1880	738	+10.6%
1890	737	−0.1%
1900	735	−0.3%
1910	759	+3.3%
1921	711	−6.3%
1930	719	+1.1%
1950	674	−6.3%
1961	562	−16.6%
1970	524	−6.8%
1980	455	−13.2%
1991	387	−14.9%
2001	376	−2.8%
2011	440	+17.0%
2021	523	+18.9%
Source: Censuses
