= Dobříš =

- Town
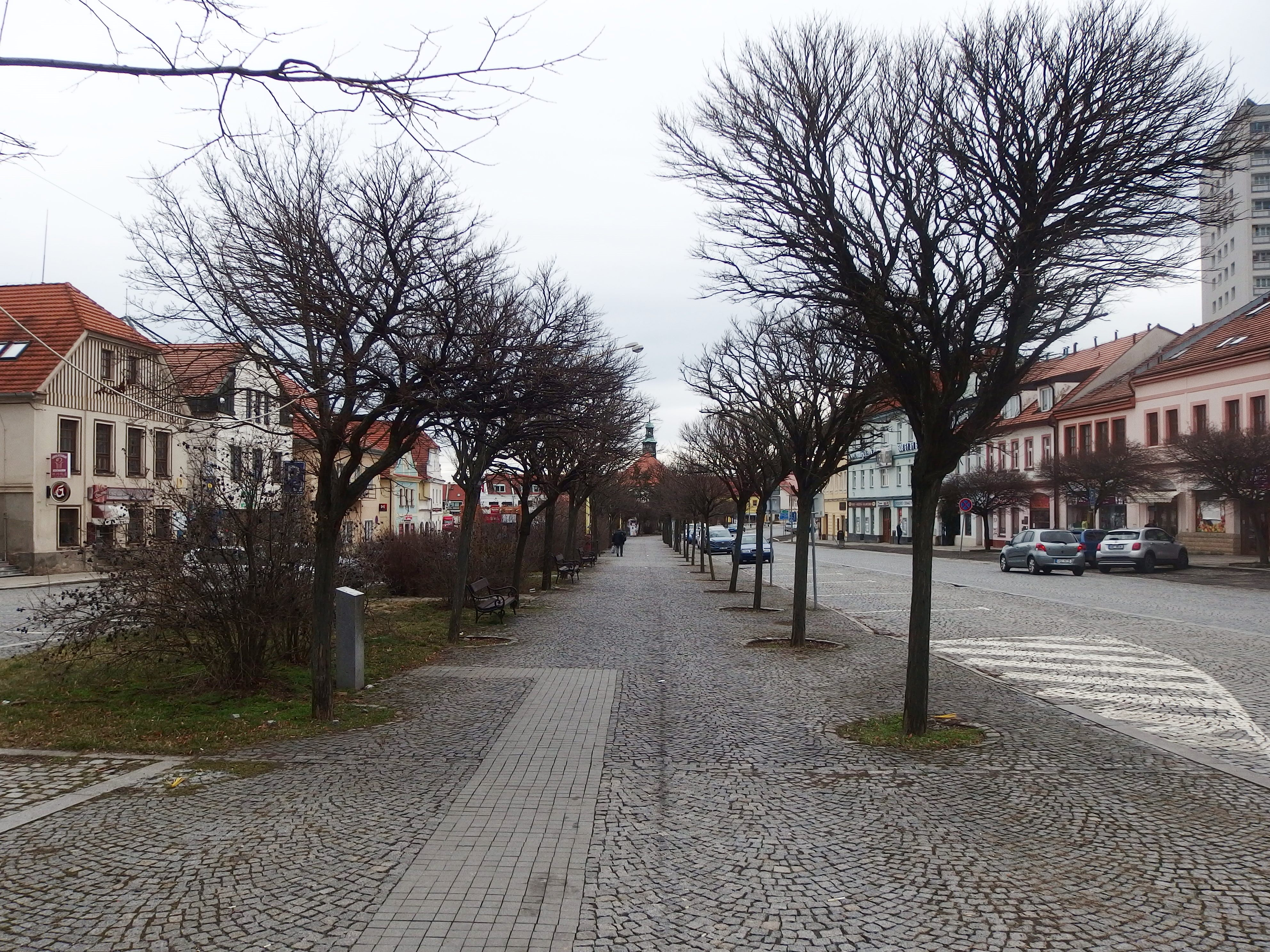
- The square Mírové náměstí

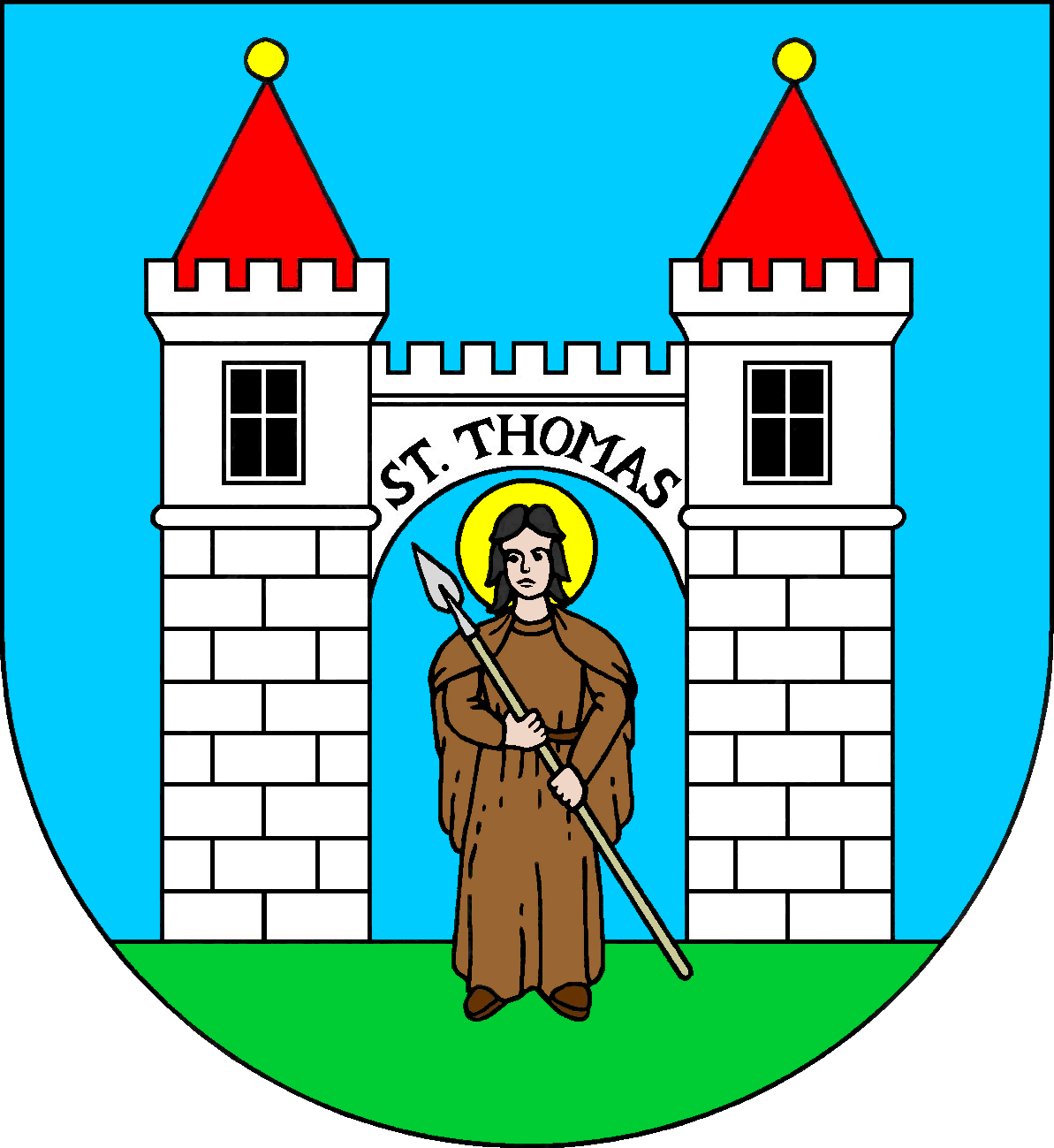
- Flag Coat of arms

- Location in the Czech Republic
- Coordinates: 49°46′52″N 14°10′2″E
- Country: Czech Republic
- Region: Central Bohemian
- District: Příbram
- First mentioned: 1252

Government
  - Mayor: Pavel Svoboda

Area
  - Total: 53.42 km^{2} (20.63 sq mi)
- Elevation: 371 m (1,217 ft)

Population (2026-01-01)
  - Total: 8,882
  - Density: 166.3/km^{2} (430.6/sq mi)
- Time zone: UTC+1 (CET)
  - Summer (DST): UTC+2 (CEST)
- Postal code: 263 01
- Website: www.mestodobris.cz

Dobříš (Czech pronunciation: [ˈdobr̝iːʃ]; German: Doberschisch) is a town in Příbram District in the Central Bohemian Region of the Czech Republic. It has about 8,900 inhabitants. It is located on the border between the Brdy Highlands and Benešov Uplands.

Dobříš was known for glove making, but in the 21st century the tradition continues only in a limited form. The main landmark of the town is the Dobříš Castle, built in the Baroque style.

== Administrative division ==
Dobříš consists of two municipal parts (in brackets population according to the 2021 census):

- Dobříš (8,764)
- Trnová (8)

== Etymology ==
The name was probably derived from the personal name Dobřech.

== Geography ==
Dobříš is located about 15 kilometres (9 mi) northeast of Příbram and 31 km (19 mi) southwest of Prague. Most of the municipal territory lies in the Brdy Highlands, but the town proper lies entirely in the Benešov Uplands. The highest point is the hill Studený vrch at 660 m (2,170 ft) above sea level.

In the town there is a system of fishponds, fed by the stream Sychrovský potok and its tributary Trnovský potok. Notably, the pond Huťský rybník is the location where muskrats, brought from North America, were first released in continental Europe.

== History ==
The first written mention of Dobříš is from 1252, when King Wenceslaus I signed a treaty with the Cistercian monastery in Plasy. Temporarily held by the noble Rosenberg family, King John of Bohemia had a hunting lodge erected at Dobříš. It was devastated during the Hussite Wars in 1421.

After the Kingdom of Bohemia had passed to the Habsburg monarchy, Dobříš was given market town rights by King Ferdinand I in 1543, confirmed by his son and successor Emperor Maximilian II in 1569. The Dobříš estate was acquired by the German House of Mansfeld in 1630. After the local castle and a large part of the town were damaged by a fire in 1720, the family had the castle rebuilt into a Rococo style manor house. The estate was inherited by the Austrian Colloredo-Mansfeld dynasty in 1780.

== Demographics ==
Historical population

Year	Pop.	±%
1869	2,960	—
1880	3,247	+9.7%
1890	3,512	+8.2%
1900	3,594	+2.3%
1910	3,665	+2.0%

Year	Pop.	±%
1921	3,347	−8.7%
1930	3,622	+8.2%
1950	4,070	+12.4%
1961	4,778	+17.4%
1970	6,401	+34.0%

Year	Pop.	±%
1980	7,466	+16.6%
1991	7,848	+5.1%
2001	7,825	−0.3%
2011	8,672	+10.8%
2021	8,772	+1.2%

Source: Censuses

== Economy ==
In the 19th century, the town became associated with the manufacturing of gloves, which began in 1865. This industry was first developed by Salamon Abeles. After World War II, a glove factory (Rukavičkářské závody) was still operating here. The factory employed 3,300 people at its peak, but the production ended in 1992. Since 1993, the small company NAPA Dobříš has been keeping the tradition.

In the town centre and near the main road to Prague there are Bobcat factories.

== Transport ==
The D4 motorway from Prague to Písek runs next to the town.

The town has a railway station located at the end of track from Prague via Vrané nad Vltavou. The station opened on 22 September 1897.

== Sights ==
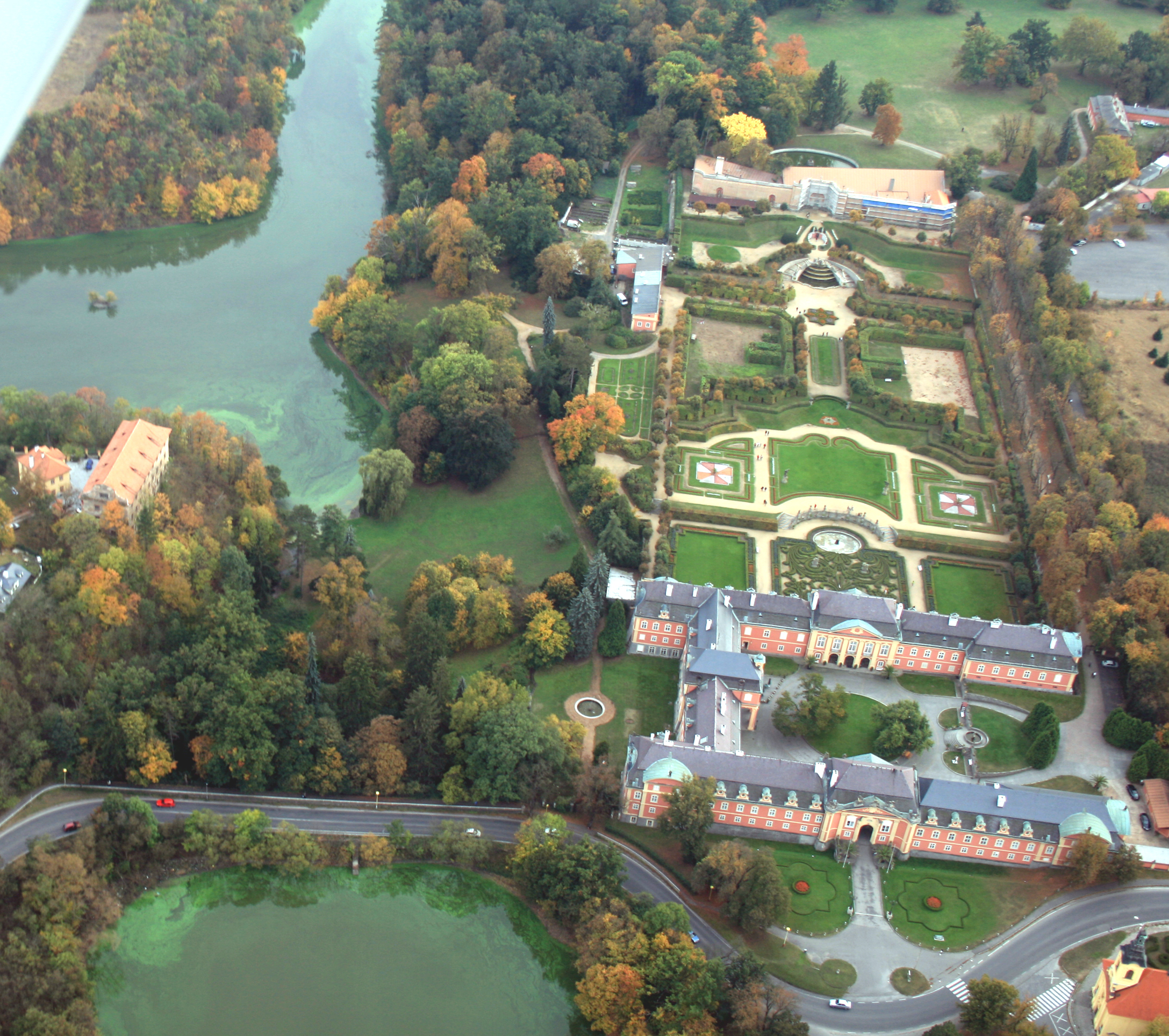
Aerial view of the Dobříš Castle

The most significant monument in the town is the Dobříš Castle. In 1745–1755, the original Baroque castle was rebuilt into its current late Baroque form. Decorator Giovanni Niccolò Servandoni, sculptor Ignác František Platzer and painter Jan Petr Molitor participated in the decoration of the castle. Currently owned again by the noble family of Colloredo-Mansfeld, it is known as a fine example of Rococo architecture and for its gardens, including a French formal garden (one of the most popular in the country) and an English landscape garden.

== Notable people ==
- Josef Balabán (1894–1941), soldier and resistance fighter
- Jorge Amado (1912–2001), Brazilian writer; lived here
- Jan Drda (1915–1970), writer, journalist and politician; buried here
- Zélia Gattai (1916–2008), Brazilian writer; lived here
- Filip Dort (born 1980), footballer; lives here

== Twin towns – sister cities ==
Dobříš is twinned with:

- Geldrop-Mierlo, Netherlands
- Tonnerre, France
