= Brloh =

Brloh may refer to places in the Czech Republic:

- Brloh (Český Krumlov District), a municipality and village in the South Bohemian Region
- Brloh (Pardubice District), a municipality and village in the Pardubice Region
- Brloh, a village and part of Drhovle in the South Bohemian Region
- Brloh, a village and part of Louny in the Ústí nad Labem Region
