= Scanes =

Scanes is a surname. Notable people with the surname include:

- Albert Scanes (1900–1969), Australian cricketer
- John Scanes (1928–2004), British artist
