= Chraštice =

- Municipality
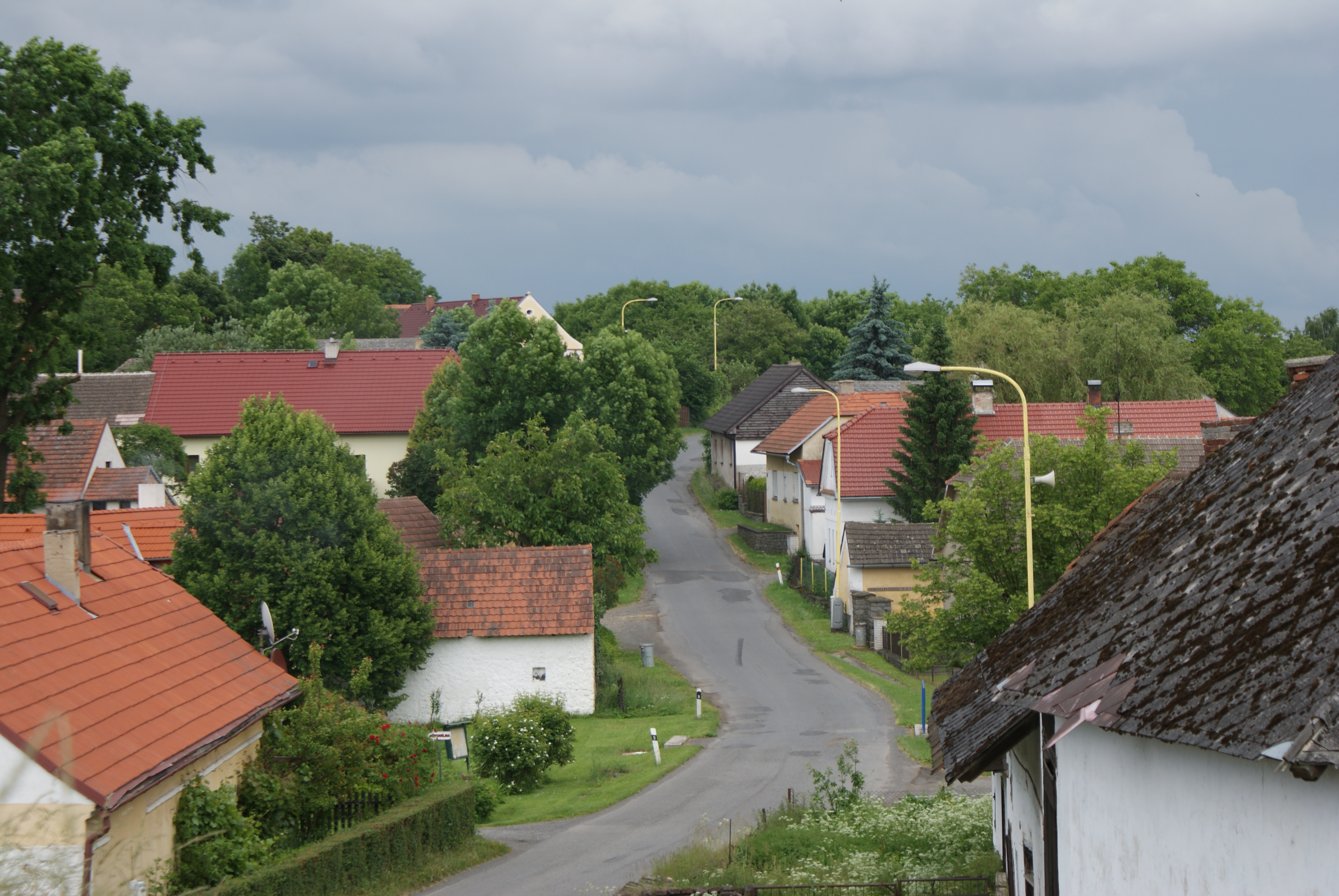
- Chraštičky, a part of Chraštice

- Location in the Czech Republic
- Coordinates: 49°34′37″N 14°4′19″E
- Country: Czech Republic
- Region: Central Bohemian
- District: Příbram
- First mentioned: 1260

Area
  - Total: 6.65 km^{2} (2.57 sq mi)
- Elevation: 546 m (1,791 ft)

Population (2026-01-01)
  - Total: 251
  - Density: 37.7/km^{2} (97.8/sq mi)
- Time zone: UTC+1 (CET)
  - Summer (DST): UTC+2 (CEST)
- Postal code: 262 72
- Website: www.obec-chrastice.cz

Chraštice is a municipality and village in Příbram District in the Central Bohemian Region of the Czech Republic. It has about 300 inhabitants.

== Administrative division ==
Chraštice consists of two municipal parts (in brackets population according to the 2021 census):

- Chraštice (166)
- Chraštičky (69)

== Etymology ==
The initial name of the village was Chrastice. The name was derived from the surname Chrast or Chrást, meaning "the village of Chrast's/Chrást's people". Chraštičky is a diminutive form of Chraštice.

== Geography ==
Chraštice is located about 12 kilometres (7 mi) south of Příbram and 54 km (34 mi) southwest of Prague. It lies in the Benešov Uplands. The highest point is the low hill Skalky at 563 m (1,847 ft) above sea level. There are three fishponds in the municipal territory.

== History ==
The first written mention of Chraštice is from 1260.

== Demographics ==
Historical population

Year	Pop.	±%
1869	560	—
1880	562	+0.4%
1890	555	−1.2%
1900	498	−10.3%
1910	458	−8.0%

Year	Pop.	±%
1921	451	−1.5%
1930	442	−2.0%
1950	345	−21.9%
1961	337	−2.3%
1970	278	−17.5%

Year	Pop.	±%
1980	275	−1.1%
1991	240	−12.7%
2001	222	−7.5%
2011	213	−4.1%
2021	235	+10.3%

Source: Censuses

== Transport ==
The D4 motorway from Prague to Písek runs through the municipality.

== Sights ==
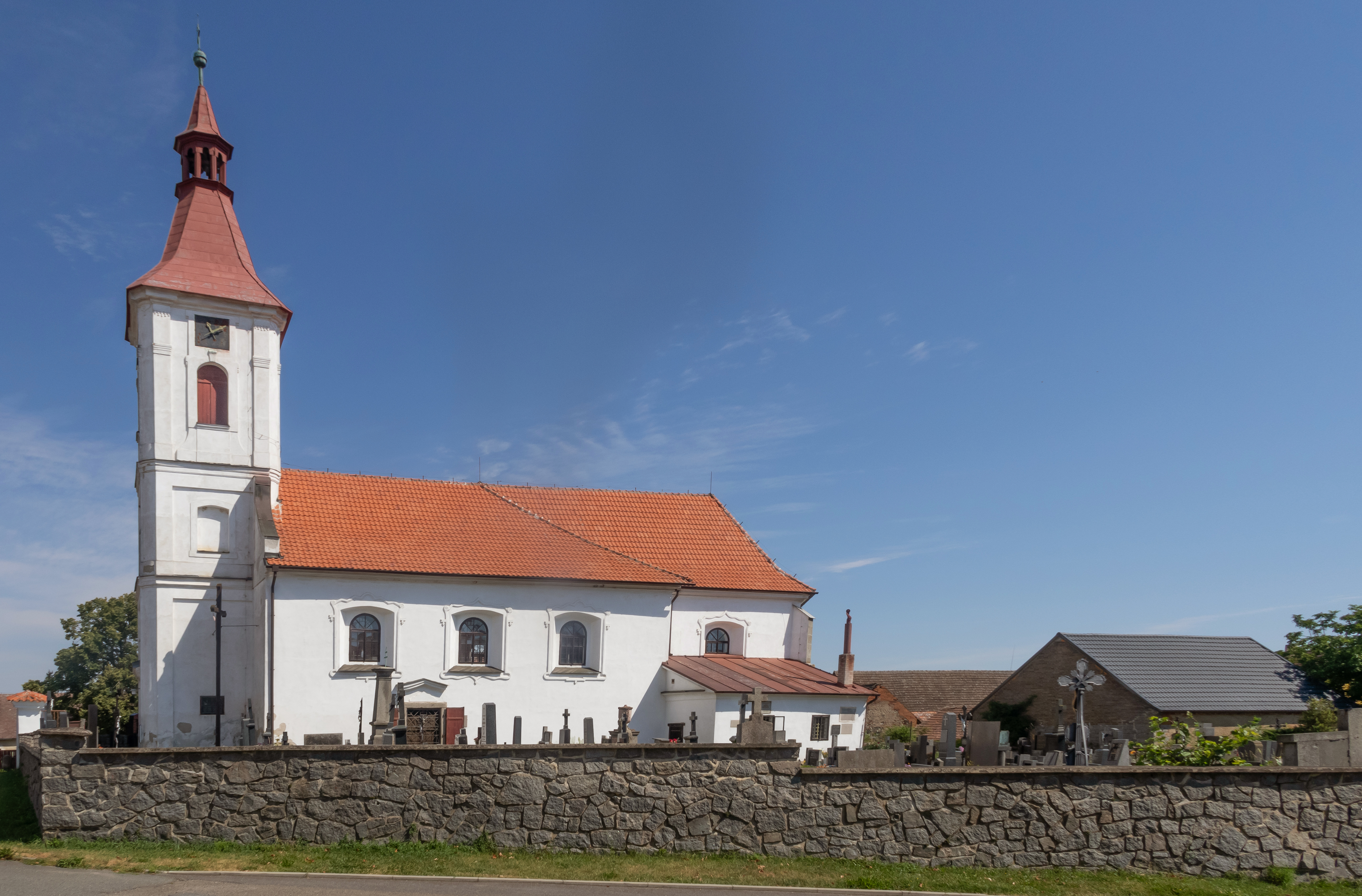
Church of the Assumption of the Virgin Mary

The main landmark of Chraštice is the Church of the Assumption of the Virgin Mary. It is a valuable early Gothic church from the 13th century, which was partly rebuilt in the Baroque style and extended into its current form in 1723–1724.

A historically valuable building is the former fortress from the 14th century, later rebuilt into an inn.
