= Aigen =

Aigen is the name of several populated places in Austria. These include the following:

- Aigen (Salzburg city district), a district of the city of Salzburg
- Aigen im Ennstal, Styria
- Aigen im Mühlkreis, Upper Austria
- Aigen, a village in the municipality of Furth bei Göttweig, Lower Austria
- Aigen, a cadastral community in the Strobl municipality, Salzburg state
