= Mirotice =

- Town
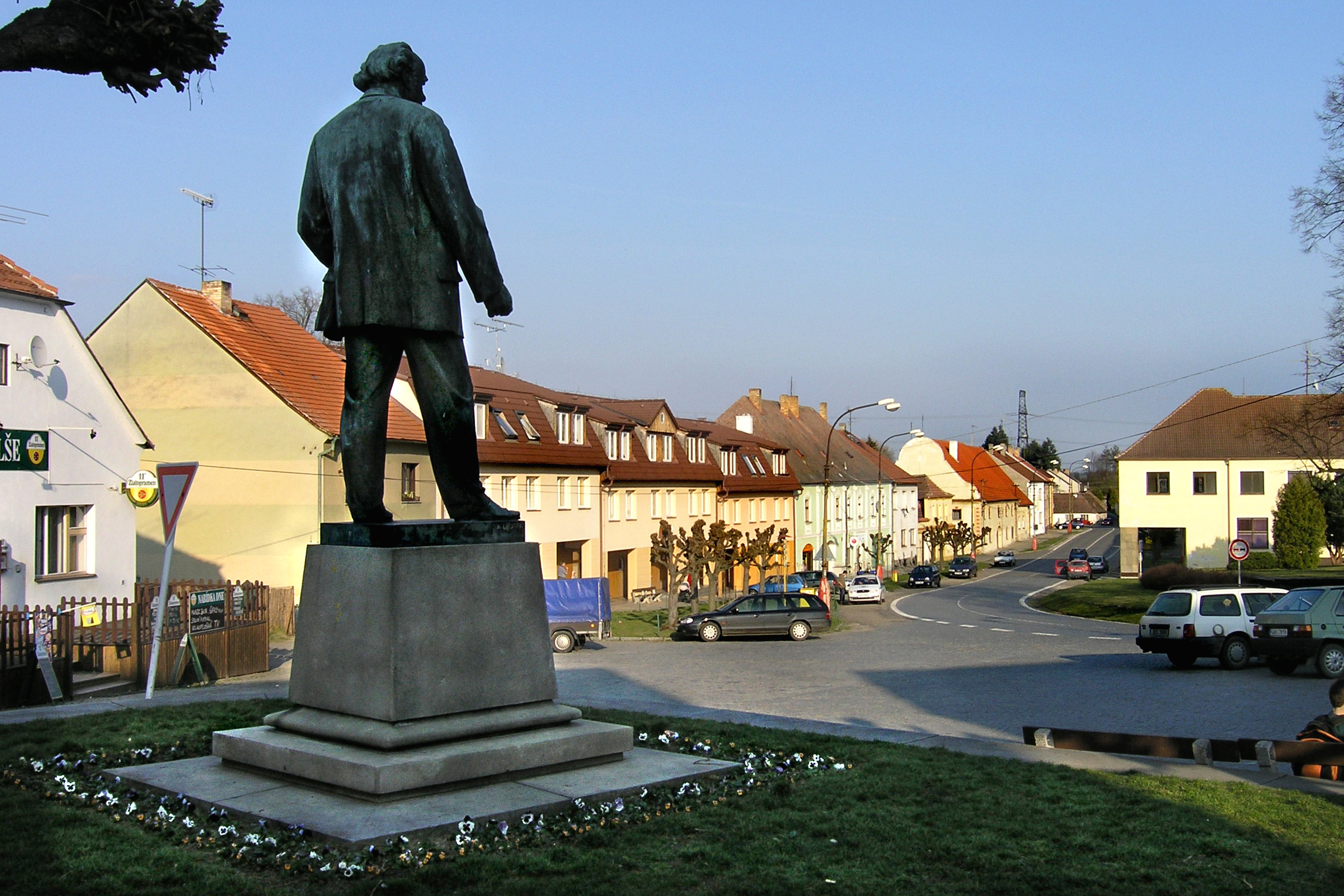
- Statue of Mikoláš Aleš on the town square

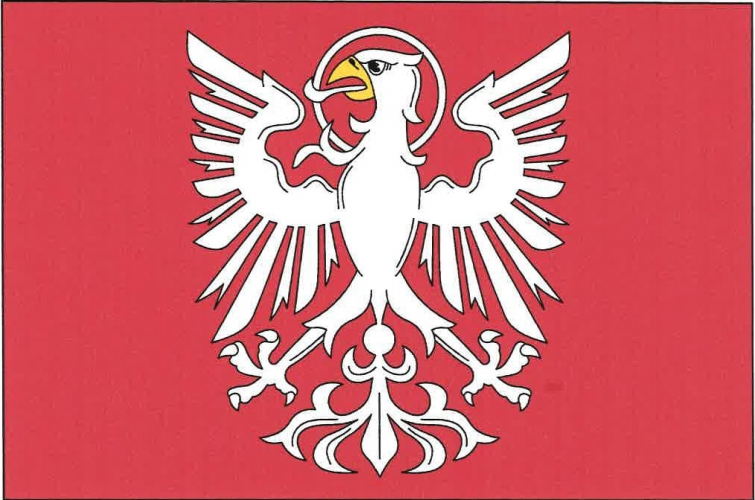
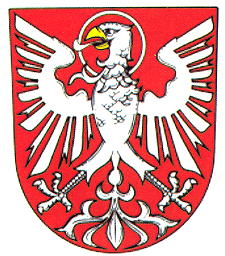
- Flag Coat of arms

- Location in the Czech Republic
- Coordinates: 49°25′45″N 14°2′13″E
- Country: Czech Republic
- Region: South Bohemian
- District: Písek
- First mentioned: 1254

Government
  - Mayor: Martina Mikšíčková

Area
  - Total: 25.60 km^{2} (9.88 sq mi)
- Elevation: 412 m (1,352 ft)

Population (2026-01-01)
  - Total: 1,207
  - Density: 47.15/km^{2} (122.1/sq mi)
- Time zone: UTC+1 (CET)
  - Summer (DST): UTC+2 (CEST)
- Postal code: 398 01
- Website: www.mirotice.cz

Mirotice (Czech pronunciation: [ˈmɪrocɪtsɛ]; German: Mirotitz) is a town in Písek District in the South Bohemian Region of the Czech Republic. It has about 1,200 inhabitants. The town is located on the Lomnice River, on the border between the Benešov Uplands and Tábor Uplands.

Mirotice was founded in the mid-13th century. It is known as the birthplace of Mikoláš Aleš, who is one of the most important Czech painters.

== Administrative division ==
Mirotice consists of nine municipal parts (in brackets population according to the 2021 census):

- Mirotice (962)
- Bořice (30)
- Jarotice (11)
- Lučkovice (47)
- Obora u Radobytec (10)
- Radobytce (58)
- Rakovické Chalupy (3)
- Stráž (19)
- Strážovice (63)

== Etymology ==
The name is derived from the personal name Mirota, meaning "the village of Mirota's people".

== Geography ==
Mirotice is located about 15 kilometres (9 mi) northwest of Písek and 59 km (37 mi) northwest of České Budějovice. It lies mostly in the Benešov Uplands, but it also extends into the Tábor Uplands in the south and east. The highest point is the hill Paračov at 512 m (1,680 ft) above sea level. The Lomnice River flows through the town. A notable body of water is the fishpond Pančár, located south of the town proper.

== History ==
The first written mention of Mirotice is from 1254, when the Church of Saint Giles was documented. It was founded in the mid-13th century on the site of an older settlement from the 12th century, as a free royal town around the church. It was located on a trade route from Prague to Passau. Mirotice was damaged during the Hussite Wars in the first half of the 15th century. After the wars, it was acquired by the Lev of Rožmitál family. In 1544, the town became part of the Zvíkov estate. In 1562, Mirotice became an independent town and the town hall was built. Development was slowed down by a large fire in 1575.

In 1611, Mirotice was badly damaged by the Passau army and again became a vassal town. Further destruction occurred as a result of the Thirty Years' War between 1639 and 1648. In 1688, Mirotice was bought by the monastery in Schlägl and a new development of the town began. Mirotice benefited from its role as a transport hub until 1875, when a railway was built that did not go through the town. Mirotice ceased to be a town, but in 1998 the town title was returned to the municipality.

== Demographics ==
Historical population

Year	Pop.	±%
1869	2,944	—
1880	2,873	−2.4%
1890	2,587	−10.0%
1900	2,576	−0.4%
1910	2,397	−6.9%

Year	Pop.	±%
1921	2,238	−6.6%
1930	2,030	−9.3%
1950	1,572	−22.6%
1961	1,493	−5.0%
1970	1,382	−7.4%

Year	Pop.	±%
1980	1,264	−8.5%
1991	1,154	−8.7%
2001	1,104	−4.3%
2011	1,149	+4.1%
2021	1,203	+4.7%

Source: Censuses

== Transport ==
The D4 motorway from Prague to Písek runs around the town.

== Sights ==
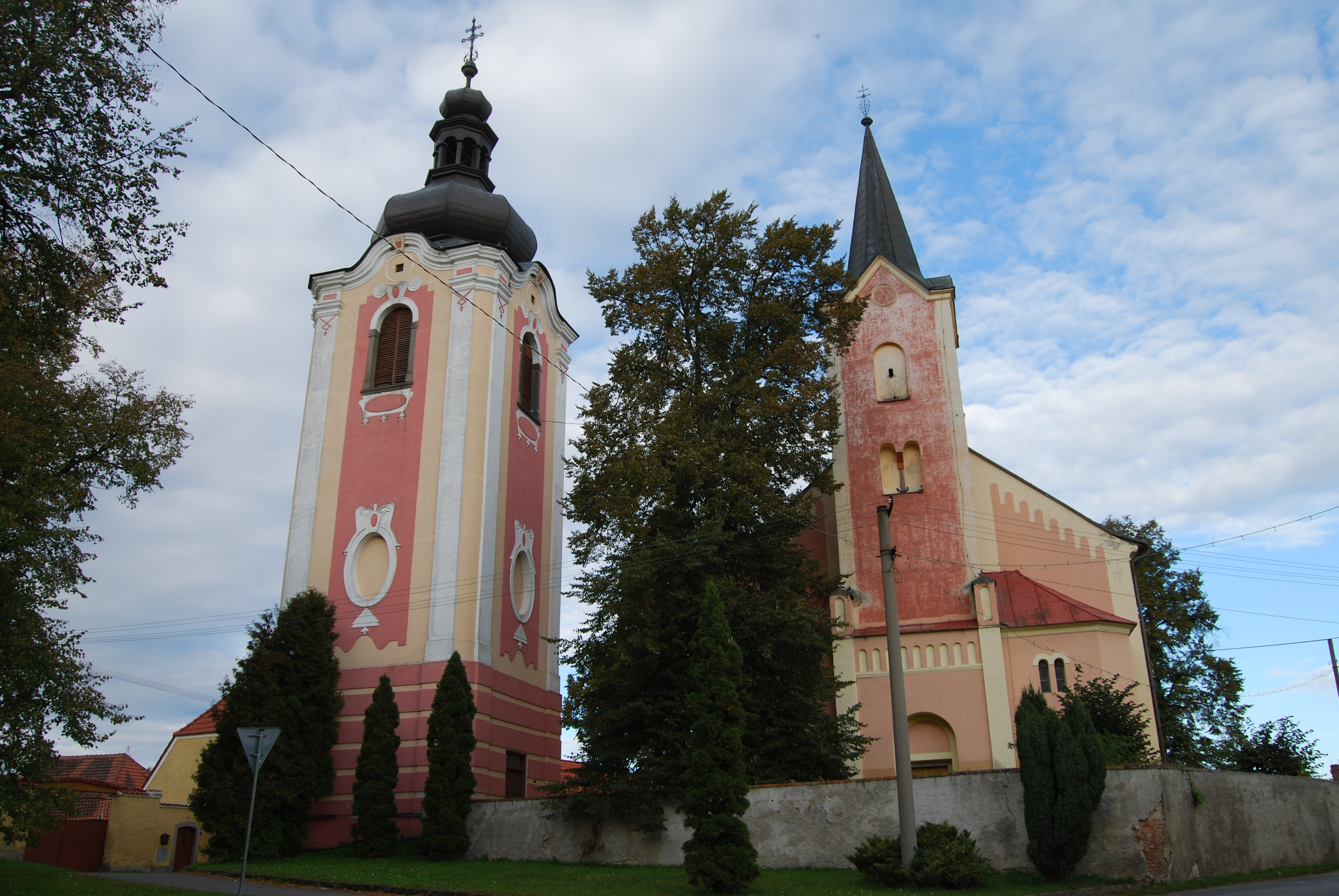
Church of Saint Giles

The main landmark is the Church of Saint Giles. Originally it was built in the Romaneque style in the late 12th century or around 1200. It was rebuilt in the Baroque style in 1694, then it was completely rebuilt in the pseudo-Romanesque style 1870–1872. Next to the church is a separate late Baroque bell tower. It was built 1753–1756, when it replaced an older wooden building from 1670. It is among the most valuable late Baroque bell towers in the country.

The birth house of Mikoláš Aleš, who is the most famous local native, burned down in 1907. Today a replica from 1937 stands in its place, which houses the Monument to Mikoláš Aleš and Matěj Kopecký.

== Notable people ==
- Benedikt Schack (1758–1826), composer and opera singer
- Matěj Kopecký (1775–1847), puppeteer, lived here
- Alexander Seik (1824–1905), photographer
- Mikoláš Aleš (1852–1913), painter
