= Chouzavá =

- Village
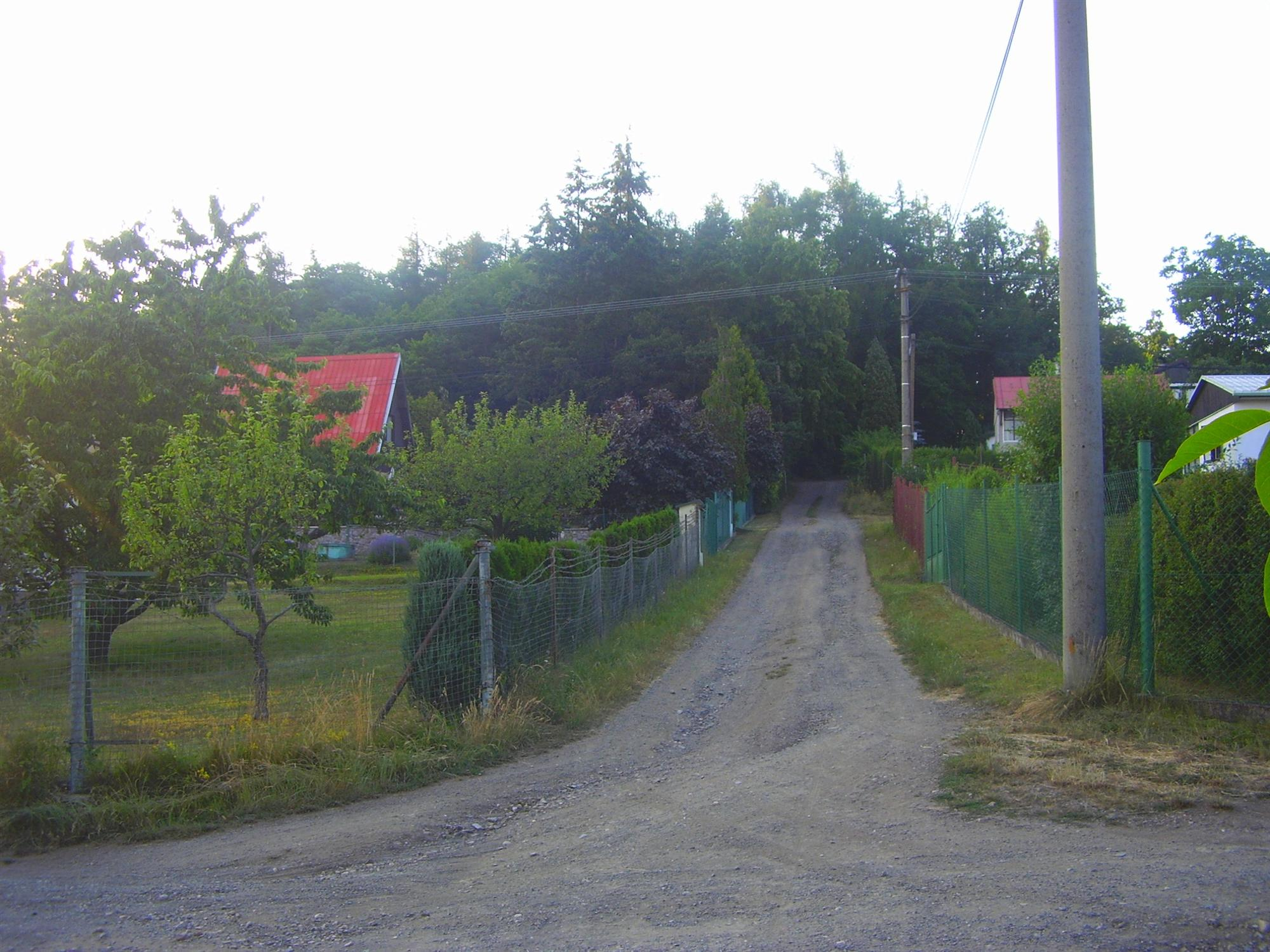
- View through the Chouzavá cottage area towards Kytín

- Location in the Czech Republic
- Coordinates: 49°50′12″N 14°13′37″E
- Country: Czech Republic
- Region: Central Bohemian
- District: Příbram
- Municipality: Voznice
- First mentioned: 1603

Area
  - Total: 1.97 km^{2} (0.76 sq mi)
- Elevation: 425 m (1,394 ft)

Population (2021)
  - Total: 102
  - Density: 51.8/km^{2} (134/sq mi)
- Time zone: UTC+1 (CET)
  - Summer (DST): UTC+2 (CEST)
- Postal code: 263 01

Chouzavá is a village and municipal part of Voznice in Příbram District in the Central Bohemian Region of the Czech Republic. It has about 100 inhabitants.

== Etamology ==
The initial name of the village was Chouzava. It was probably first the name of the stream by which the village is located, and the name was transferred to the village. The name of the stream was most likely derived from the Czech word chudý ('poor').

== Geography ==
Chouzavá is located in the northern part of the Voznice municipality, about 26 kilometres (16 mi) southwest of Prague The settlement of Chouzavá itself lies on the border of districts and is divided into two basic settlement units into two municipalities:

- Chouzavá I – basic settlement unit and municipal part of Voznice (Příbram District)
- Chouzavá II – basic settlement unit in the municipality of Kytín (Prague-West District)

== History ==
The first written mention of Chouzavá is from 1603.

During 1900–1949, Chouzavá was a settlement of the town of Dobříš in the Příbram District. In 1950, the municipality of Voznice and the settlement of Chouzavá separated from the municipality of Dobříš.

== Demographics ==
Historical population

Year	Pop.	±%
1869	57	—
1880	58	+1.8%
1890	62	+6.9%
1900	62	+0.0%
1910	59	−4.8%

Year	Pop.	±%
1921	64	+8.5%
1930	48	−25.0%
1950	16	−66.7%
1961	20	+25.0%
1970	12	−40.0%

Year	Pop.	±%
1980	14	+16.7%
1991	11	−21.4%
2001	8	−27.3%
2011	50	+525.0%
2021	102	+104.0%

Source: Censuses

== Transport ==
The D4 motorway from Prague to Písek runs east of the village, just beyond its territory.

== Sights ==
There are no protected cultural monuments in Chouzavá.
