= Svaté Pole =

- Municipality
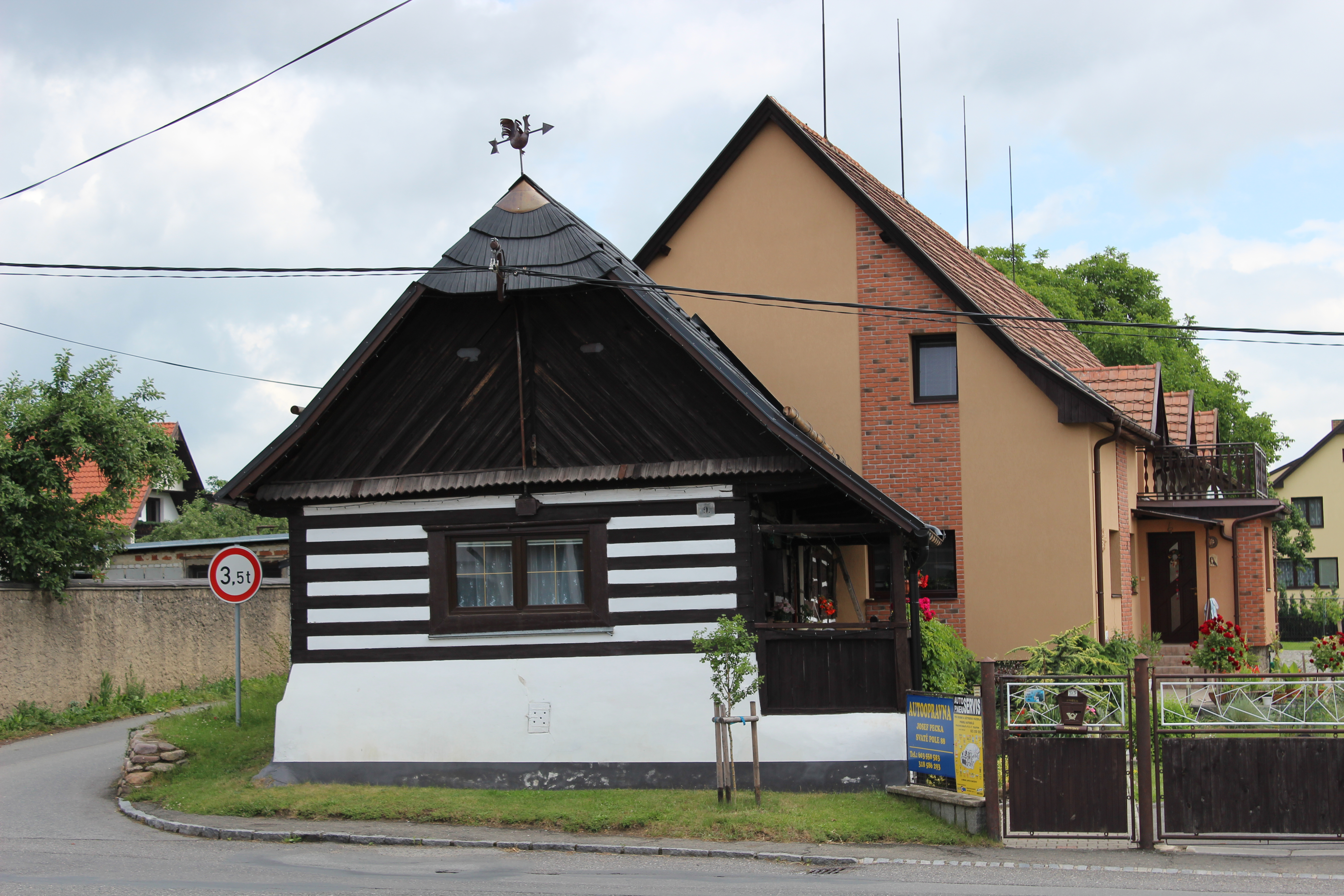
- Old wooden house

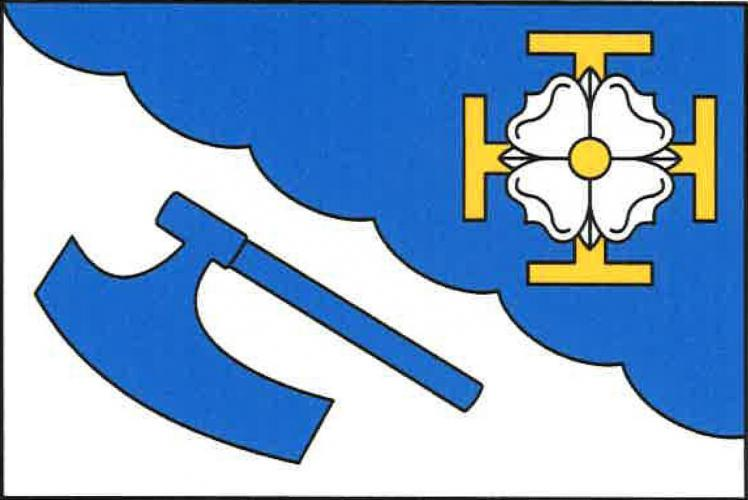
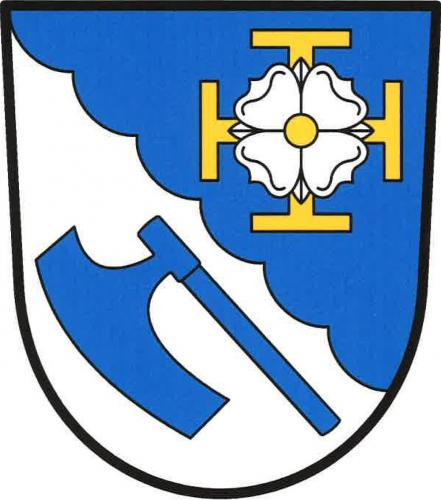
- Flag Coat of arms

- Location in the Czech Republic
- Coordinates: 49°45′5″N 14°10′9″E
- Country: Czech Republic
- Region: Central Bohemian
- District: Příbram
- First mentioned: 1352

Area
  - Total: 3.95 km^{2} (1.53 sq mi)
- Elevation: 387 m (1,270 ft)

Population (2026-01-01)
  - Total: 551
  - Density: 139/km^{2} (361/sq mi)
- Time zone: UTC+1 (CET)
  - Summer (DST): UTC+2 (CEST)
- Postal code: 263 01
- Website: www.svatepole.eu

Svaté Pole is a municipality and village in Příbram District in the Central Bohemian Region of the Czech Republic. It has about 600 inhabitants.

== Administrative division ==
Svaté Pole consists of two municipal parts (in brackets population according to the 2021 census):

- Svaté Pole (362)
- Budínek (166)

== Etymology ==
The name Svaté Pole literally means 'holy field' in Czech, but in earlier times the meaning of this expression was 'cemetery'.

== Geography ==
Svaté Pole is located about 12 kilometres (7 mi) northeast of Příbram and 34 km (21 mi) southwest of Prague. It lies in an agricultural landscape in the Benešov Uplands. There are several fishponds in the municipal territory, the largest of which is Svatopolský rybník.

== History ==
The first written mention of Svaté Pole is from 1352.

== Demographics ==
Historical population

Year	Pop.	±%
1869	339	—
1880	373	+10.0%
1890	352	−5.6%
1900	381	+8.2%
1910	379	−0.5%

Year	Pop.	±%
1921	342	−9.8%
1930	307	−10.2%
1950	257	−16.3%
1961	269	+4.7%
1970	274	+1.9%

Year	Pop.	±%
1980	266	−2.9%
1991	290	+9.0%
2001	326	+12.4%
2011	358	+9.8%
2021	528	+47.5%

Source: Censuses

== Transport ==
The D4 motorway from Prague to Písek runs through the municipality.

== Sights ==
The main landmark of Svaté Pole is the Church of Saint Elizabeth of Thuringia. It was originally a medieval Gothic church, rebuilt in the Baroque style in 1710–1721. The reconstruction was inspired by the Church of San Carlo alle Quattro Fontane in Rome.
