= Kytín =

- Municipality
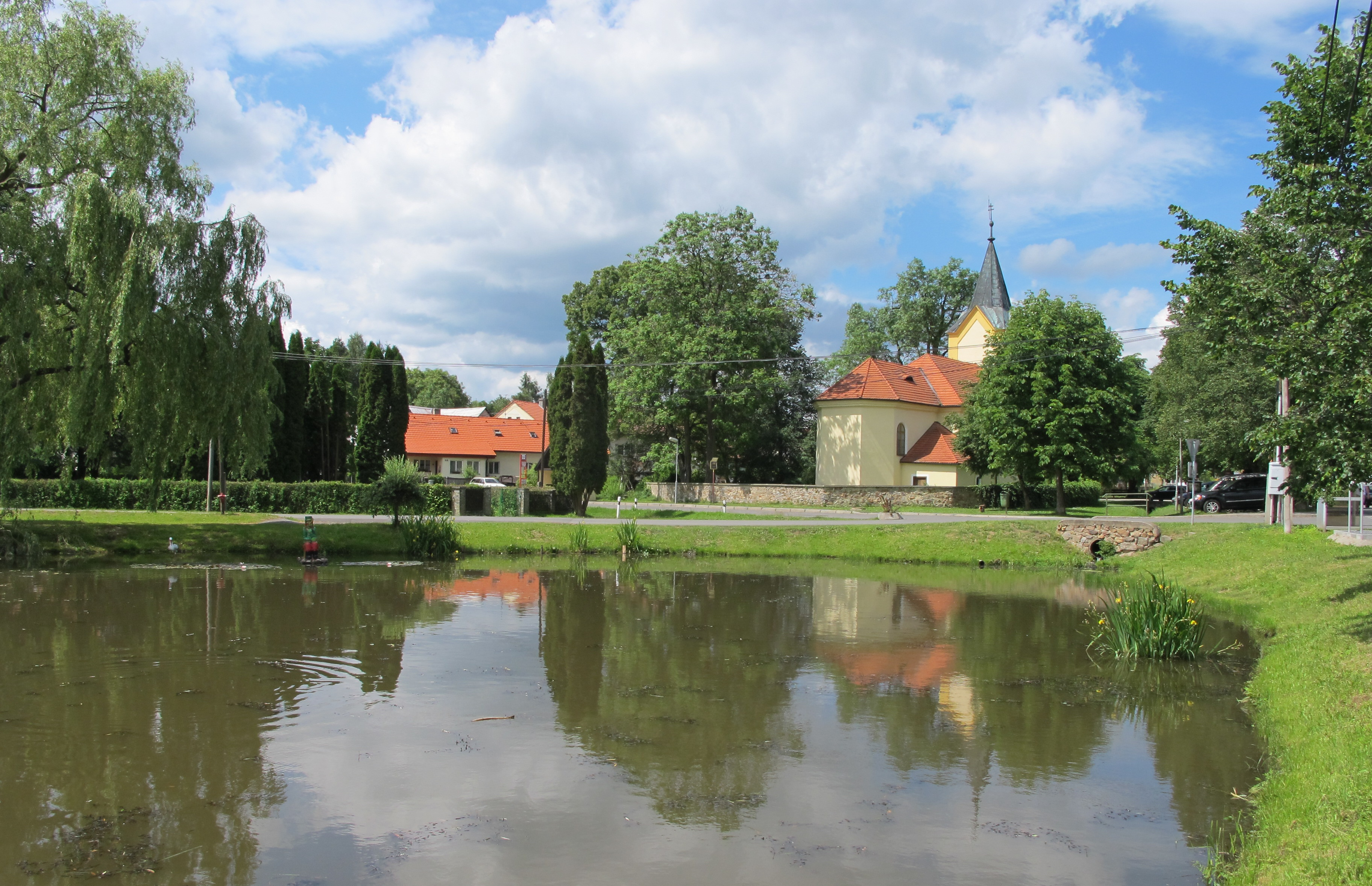
- Centre of Kytín with the Church of the Assumption of the Virgin Mary

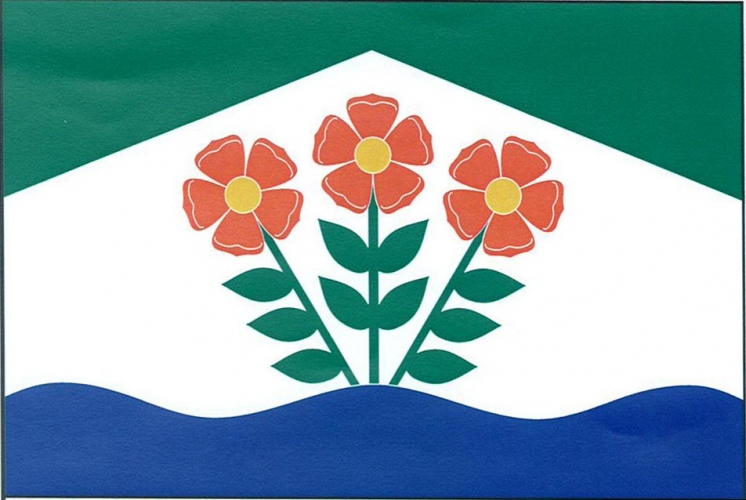
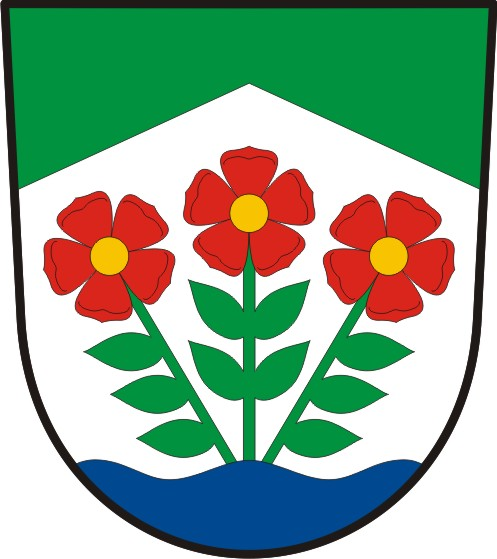
- Flag Coat of arms

- Location in the Czech Republic
- Coordinates: 49°51′3″N 14°13′9″E
- Country: Czech Republic
- Region: Central Bohemian
- District: Prague-West
- First mentioned: 1321

Area
  - Total: 10.89 km^{2} (4.20 sq mi)
- Elevation: 432 m (1,417 ft)

Population (2026-01-01)
  - Total: 627
  - Density: 57.6/km^{2} (149/sq mi)
- Time zone: UTC+1 (CET)
  - Summer (DST): UTC+2 (CEST)
- Postal code: 252 10
- Website: www.kytin.eu

Kytín (German: Kitin) is a municipality and village in Prague-West District in the Central Bohemian Region of the Czech Republic. It has about 600 inhabitants.

== Etymology ==
The name is derived from the personal name Kýta, meaning "Kýta's".

== Geography ==
Kytín is located about 25 kilometres (16 mi) southwest of Prague. The eastern part of the municipality lies in the Benešov Uplands and the western part lies in the Brdy Highlands. The highest point is at 581 m (1,906 ft) above sea level. In addition to the village proper, the built-up area also consists of the cottage settlement of Chouzavá.

== History ==
In the area of today's Kytín municipality, the villages of Korutany and Kdýčina were located already in the 10th–12th centuries, but they disappeared in the 17th century. The first written mention of Kytín is from 1321, when King John of Bohemia promoted the settlement to a market town. From 1357 to 1409, Kytín belonged to the Karlštejn estate, then it often changed hands. In 1541, the Wratislaw of Mitrovice family acquired Kytín.

In 1639, during the Thirty Years' War, Kytín was completely destroyed. It was restored in the following years, but only as a small village. The Wratislaws of Mitrovice sold the village to the Engel of Engelsfluss family in 1655. This family died out in 1743. After that, the owners of Kytín changed frequently again, mainly due to inheritance disputes. This lasted until 1849, when Kytín became an independent municipality.

== Demographics ==
Historical population

Year	Pop.	±%
1869	557	—
1880	510	−8.4%
1890	509	−0.2%
1900	462	−9.2%
1910	455	−1.5%

Year	Pop.	±%
1921	392	−13.8%
1930	397	+1.3%
1950	320	−19.4%
1961	320	+0.0%
1970	295	−7.8%

Year	Pop.	±%
1980	250	−15.3%
1991	222	−11.2%
2001	331	+49.1%
2011	519	+56.8%
2021	672	+29.5%

Source: Censuses

== Transport ==
There are no railways or major roads passing through the municipality. The D4 motorway from Prague to Písek runs near the eastern municipal border.

== Sights ==
The main landmark of Kytín is the Church of the Assumption of the Virgin Mary. Originally a Gothic church from the 14th century, it was rebuilt in the early Baroque style in 1674. Further modifications took place in the 19th and 20th centuries.
