= Voznice =

- Municipality
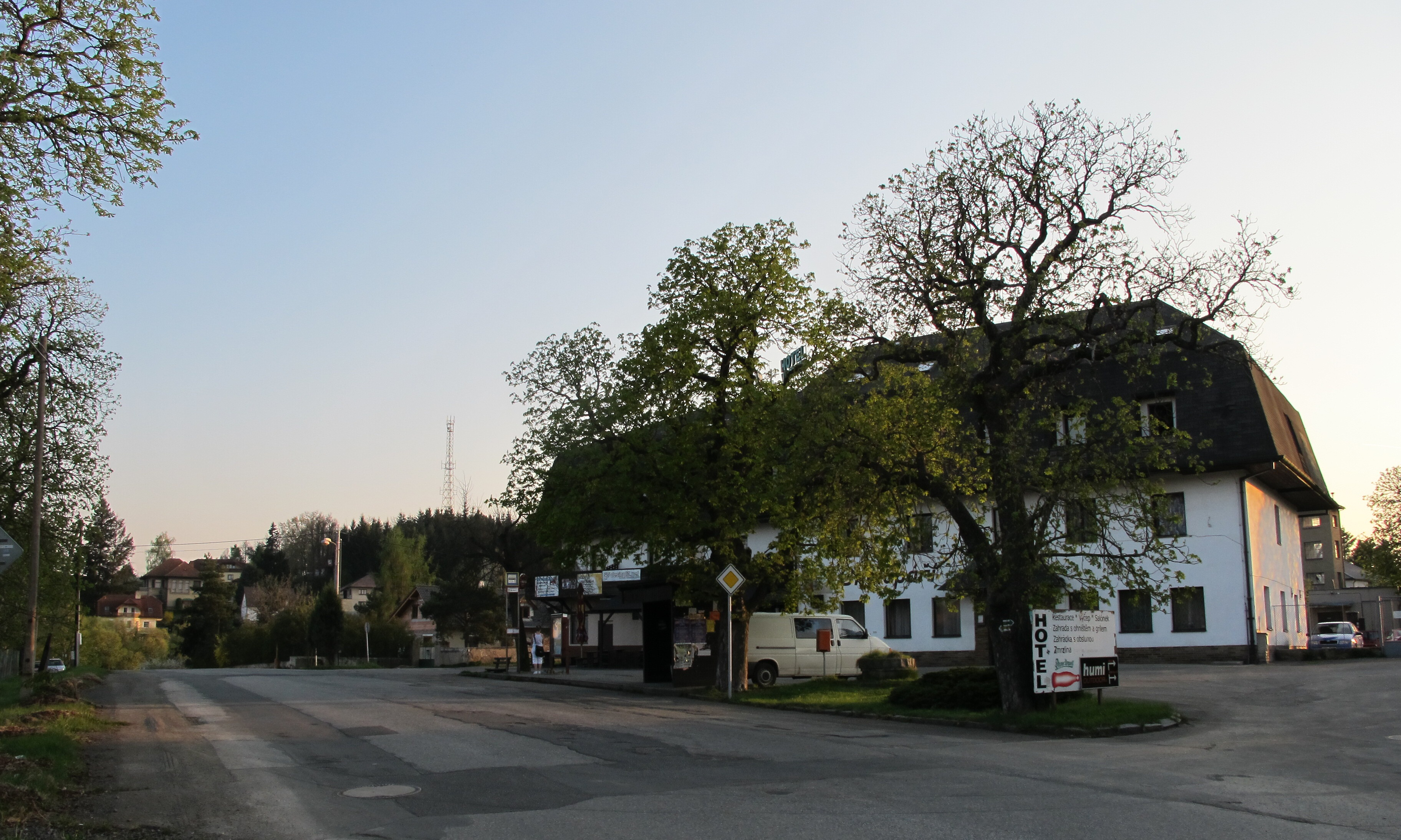
- Hotel Voznice and main road

- Flag Coat of arms

- Location in the Czech Republic
- Coordinates: 49°49′2″N 14°13′0″E
- Country: Czech Republic
- Region: Central Bohemian
- District: Příbram
- First mentioned: 1788

Area
  - Total: 14.32 km^{2} (5.53 sq mi)
- Elevation: 373 m (1,224 ft)

Population (2026-01-01)
  - Total: 744
  - Density: 52.0/km^{2} (135/sq mi)
- Time zone: UTC+1 (CET)
  - Summer (DST): UTC+2 (CEST)
- Postal code: 263 01
- Website: www.obecvoznice.cz

Voznice is a municipality and village in Příbram District in the Central Bohemian Region of the Czech Republic. It has about 700 inhabitants.

== Administrative division ==
Voznice consists of two municipal parts (in brackets population according to the 2021 census):

- Voznice (656)
- Chouzavá (102)

== Etymology ==
The initial name of the village was most likely Hvozdnice. This would mean that it was derived from the Czech word hvozd, i.e. 'forest'.

== Geography ==
Voznice is located about 20 kilometres (12 mi) northeast of Příbram and 26 km (16 mi) southwest of Prague. The eastern part of the municipality lies in the Benešov Uplands and the western part lies in the Brdy Highlands. The highest point is at 515 m (1,690 ft) above sea level. The village is surrounded on all sides by woods.

== History ==
The first written mention of Voznice is from 1788. The village was founded by the House of Mansfeld, who owned the Dobříš estate, to which it belonged. In the interwar period of the 20th century, Voznice was a popular place for the recreation of prominent people from Prague.

== Demographics ==
Historical population

Year	Pop.	±%
1869	264	—
1880	295	+11.7%
1890	288	−2.4%
1900	265	−8.0%
1910	249	−6.0%

Year	Pop.	±%
1921	247	−0.8%
1930	271	+9.7%
1950	280	+3.3%
1961	392	+40.0%
1970	369	−5.9%

Year	Pop.	±%
1980	438	+18.7%
1991	447	+2.1%
2001	456	+2.0%
2011	589	+29.2%
2021	758	+28.7%

Source: Censuses

== Transport ==
The D4 motorway from Prague to Písek runs along the eastern municipal border.

== Sights ==
The only protected cultural monument in the municipality is a statue of St. John of Nepomuk from the first half of the 18th century.
