= Aigen-Schlägl =

Coordinates: 48°38′21″N 13°57′48″E

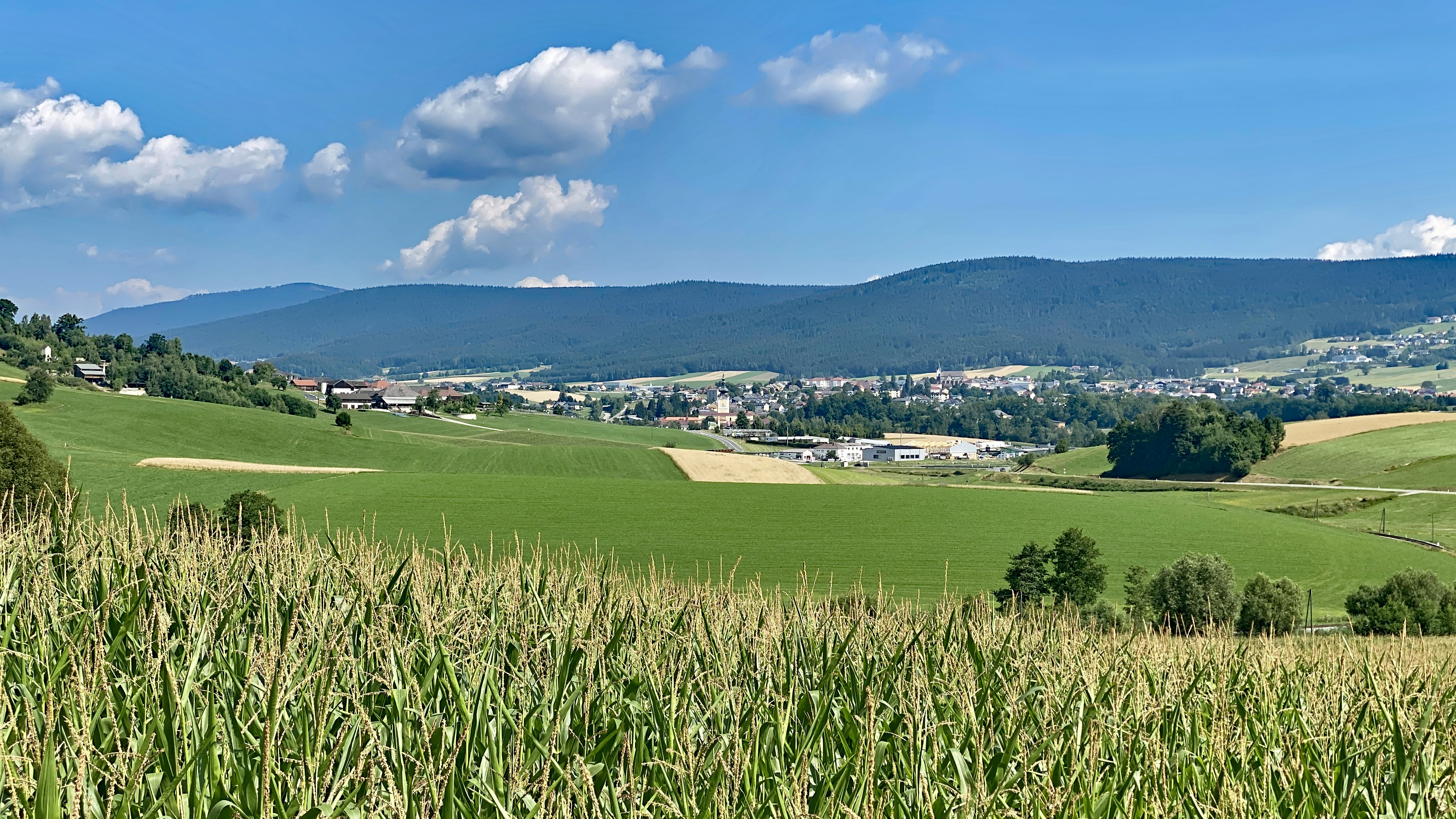
View of Aigen-Schlägl from the South

Aigen-Schlägl is a municipality in Rohrbach District of Upper Austria, Austria. As of 1 January 2019, population was 3196.

The municipality was formed on 1 May 2015 by merging two municipalities, Aigen im Mühlkreis and Schlägl.

== Localities ==
The municipality includes the following populated places (Ortschaften), with population as of 1 January 2019:

- Aigen im Mühlkreis (1781)
- Baureith (214)
- Breitenstein (70)
- Diendorf (158)
- Geiselreith (57)
- Grünwald (53)
- Kerschbaum (28)
- Natschlag (75)
- Rudolfing (121)
- Sankt Wolfgang (32)
- Schlägl (448)
- Sonnenwald (2)
- Unterneudorf (25)
- Weichsberg (69)
- Winkl (44)
- Wurmbrand (29)
