= Nicholas Treadwell =

British gallerist

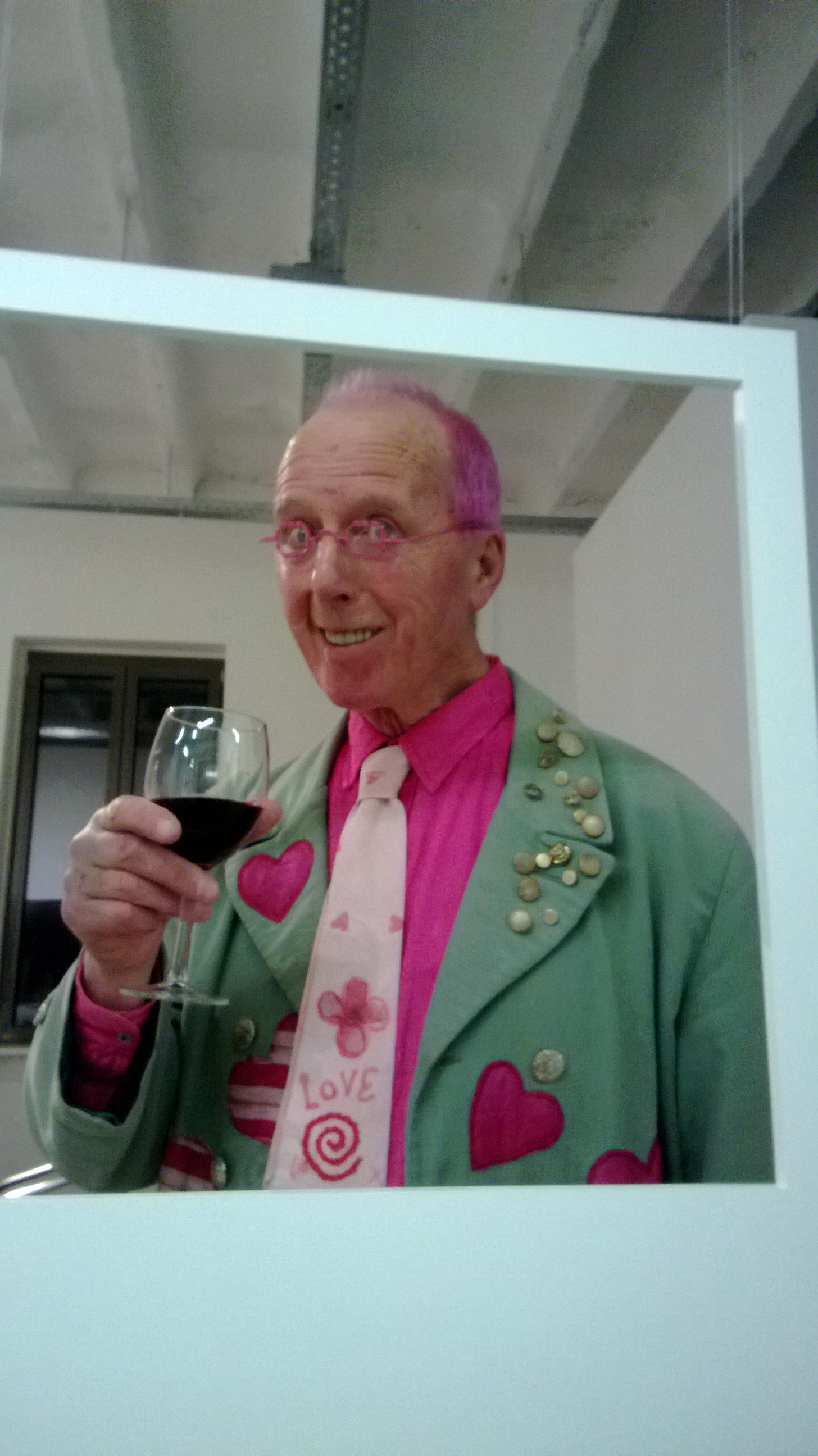
Nicholas Treadwell in 2015

Nicholas Treadwell (born 1937) owns the Nicholas Treadwell Gallery, which started in 1963 in touring vehicles, after which it was run in buildings in London, Bradford and finally Austria. Treadwell has promoted the Superhumanism art movement, which is defined as an art of urban living, conveyed in a vivid and accessible way. At times, his shows have evoked strong reactions for their provocative content. Since 2016 Treadwell has lived and worked as a gallerist in Vienna's Wieden district.

== Life and career ==
Nicholas Treadwell was born in the United Kingdom. In 1963, he toured England with a double-decker bus and two furniture vans as mobile galleries, as "Nicholas Treadwell's Mobile Art Gallery", based in Croydon.

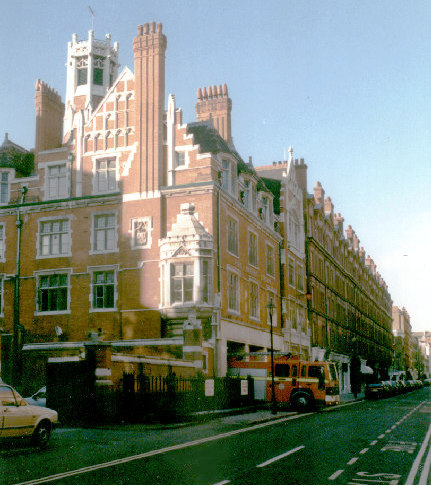
Chiltern Street, first fixed site of the gallery

In 1968, he established the Nicholas Treadwell Gallery at 36 Chiltern Street, in the West End of London, and lived in one of the rooms in the basement. An early exhibitor was artist John Scanes. Against the contemporary trend of Hard-edge abstraction and Minimalism, the gallery focused on "the basic nature of the human condition", and quickly gained a controversial reputation. In 1971, Art and Artist magazine said of one show: "The place blisters with work of searing eroticism, high camp, coarse belly laughs and hideous vulgarity".

In 1975, Treadwell asked 29 artists to submit a new approach to what he termed the normal "academic and dull" portraits of Queen Elizabeth. The results showed her hand-in-hand with Henry VIII, rowing a boat and drinking from a Union Jack mug. Treadwell said that business with tourists had been good, but he did not invite the Queen to the show, because "I see them as very affectionate portraits, but I don't know how she would see them".

In 1978, he acquired Denne Hill, a mansion with 52 rooms, designed by George Devey and built in 1871–75, in Womenswold between Canterbury and Dover; restoration took two years but it was opened to the public in July 1980. Denne Hill provided studios for artists and accommodation for visitors; Treadwell ran it alongside the London gallery until 1984.

The Chiltern Street gallery was key to the launch of the Superhumanism (or Super Humanism) movement, which is defined as "art about people, people living the life of an urban society", and about which Treadwell wrote the first book in 1979. He published a second book on Superhumanism and promoted the movement through exhibitions in the United Kingdom and on the continent. Ben Moss, in his book Four Funerals and a Wedding, wrote:

The actual imagery of the superhumanists, while striking, and sometimes shocking, reflected the contemporary feelings of the Western experience. It was preoccupied with daily life, with the characters of the street, or characters of an obtuse nature, and with scenes depicting the emotions, stresses or potential perversions lying within each of us. The artists, while portraying their ideas in aesthetically different ways, shared a desire to convey the moving nature of their subject matter in an understandably vivid manner. A philosophical acceptance of human weakness was an important characteristic of superhumanist art, but humour, cynicism, pessimism and anger were also present, along with an almost sad observation of the human condition, emotions which were the driving forces behind some of the movement's most striking imagery.

In 1981, Treadwell's stand at the FIAC (Foire Internationale d'Art Contemporain) at the Grand Palais in Paris was deemed "deplorable and very popular" by Richard Shone in The Burlington Magazine.

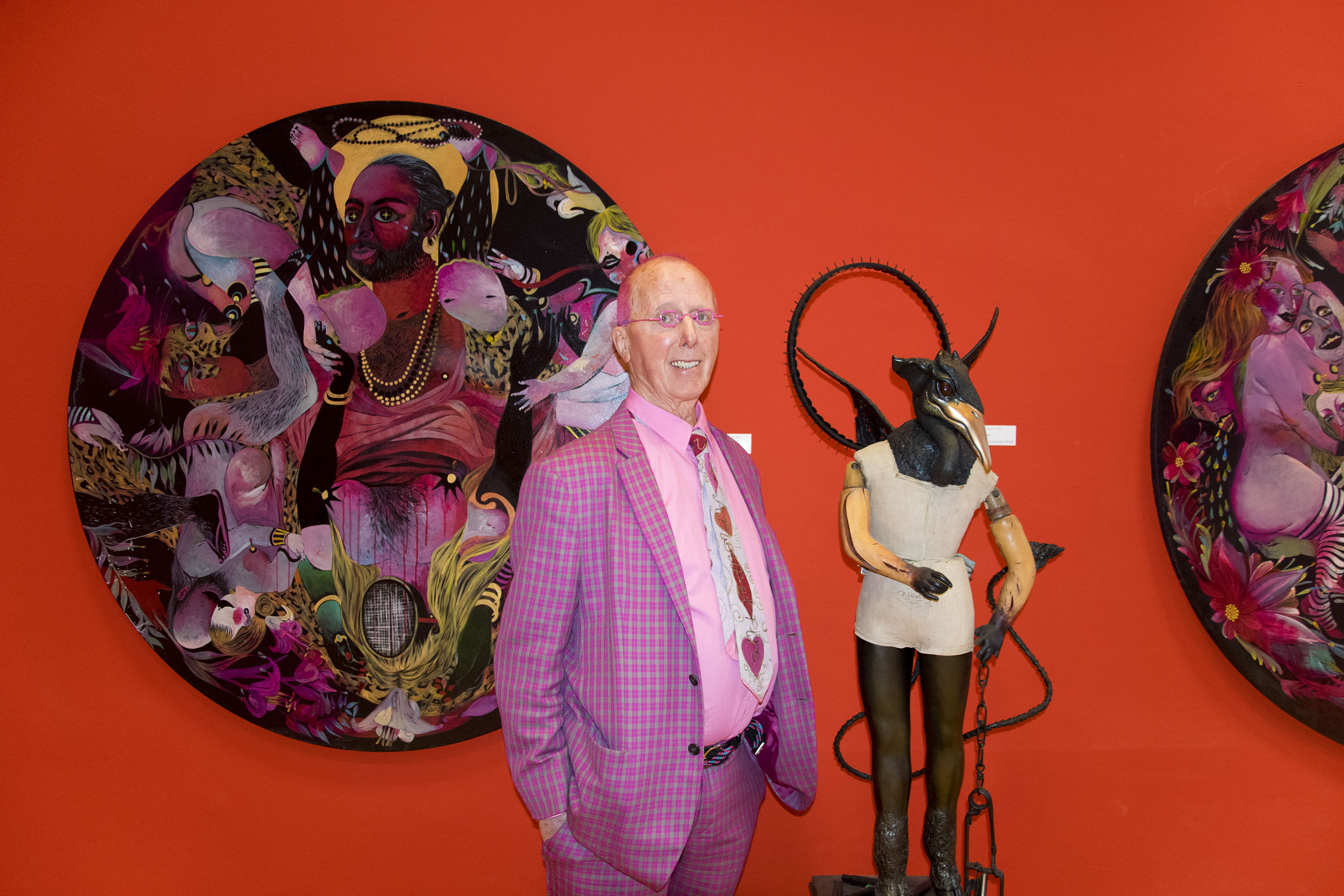
Nicholas Treadwell in his gallery in Vienna, 2016

In 1984, Treadwell left Chiltern Street, and in 1987 opened Treadwell's Art Mill for Superhumanist work in a three-storey former wool mill in Little Germany, Bradford. (Note: Although Cassidy says a cotton mill, Treadwell says a wool mill; Bradford used to be a wool city. "Bradford Historical Attractions ", visitbradford.com. Retrieved 14 August 2010.) The Art Mill provided residency space for 14 artists, as well as a theatre, a cinema and a vegetarian cafe. Treadwell was particularly interested in supporting artists in their first few years out of college and did so with many now successful artists such as Tim Noble and Sue Webster who had a two-year residency at his 3000m2 Art Mill, when he felt it was important to encourage them not to compromise with their work. Treadwell opposed the "posh shop—where a few rich people help a few artists get rich." The Art Mill, erected in 1847, was visited by 25,000 people, but increasing debts forced Treadwell to put it up for sale by 1991.

In the early 1990s Treadwell discovered a new wave of young talent emerging from British art schools, most notably two graduates working with extraordinarily disturbed figuration. Alun Jury hailed from Cheltenham College of Art. Paul Rosenbloom, his tutor at Cheltenham, phoned Treadwell directly to advise him that he had a student who was perfect for the Treadwell Gallery. He was followed by a precocious and somewhat provocative young British painter Duncan Mosley from Duncan of Jordanstone College of Art, who Treadwell went on to describe in the book Kiss My Art as "a truly rare talent". In mid-1991 Treadwell attended Art Basel, but declaring that the work on show had no merit, decided instead to open his own show of 'Superhumanism' in an old BMW showroom nearby. The show was very successful.

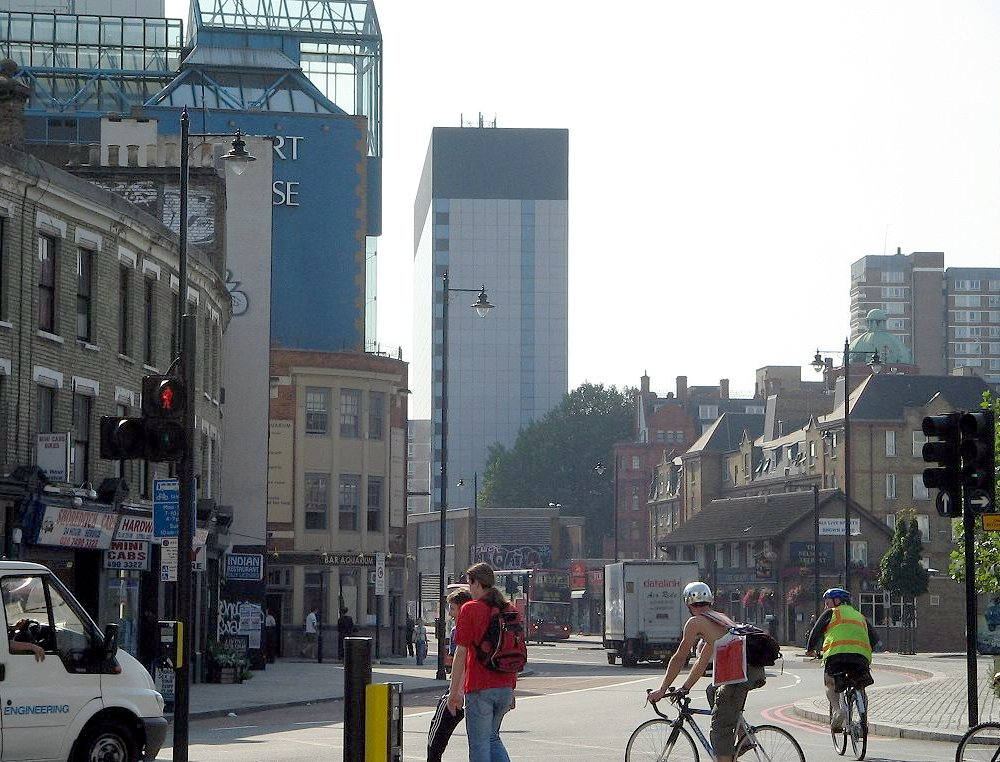
Old Street, East London: the Nicholas Treadwell Gallery was here in 1996.

By 1996, the Nicholas Treadwell Gallery was at 326 Old Street, London. His own home was described as "littered" with paintings and sculptures, some by an anorexic artist who had died the previous year—one of these showed a small body huddled inside a wardrobe, in the bottom drawer of which the artist had placed her adoption papers. Treadwell said her sculptures were "very depressing but they do give you insight into the illness."

In 1998, John Windsor in The Independent said that the work of the Young British Artists seemed tame compared with that of the "shock art" of the 1970s, including "kinky outrages" at the Nicholas Treadwell Gallery, amongst which were a "hanging, anatomically detailed leather straitjacket, complete with genitals", titled Pink Crucifixion, by Mandy Havers.

In January 2000, the Treadwell Gallery moved to Die Station, a set of buildings fronting a river near to the Bohemian Woods in Upper Austria.

In 2004, The Guardian's art critic Adrian Searle reviewed Mike Kelley—The Uncanny at Tate Liverpool. In the show were "super-realist" sculptures from the 1960s and 70s, many of which were by artists represented by what Searle called "the peculiar Nicholas Treadwell Gallery" and which he "had hoped never to see the first time, let alone again."

Treadwell wrote a letter to The Guardian saying that Searle's "dismissive language in relation to major works by the visionary artists Robert Knight and Malcolm Poynter, for instance, is inexplicable". This was followed by a letter from John Keane, who said that galleries such as Treadwell's, outside an establishment coterie, were inevitably met with "a dismissive sneer" by critics who acted as a herd.

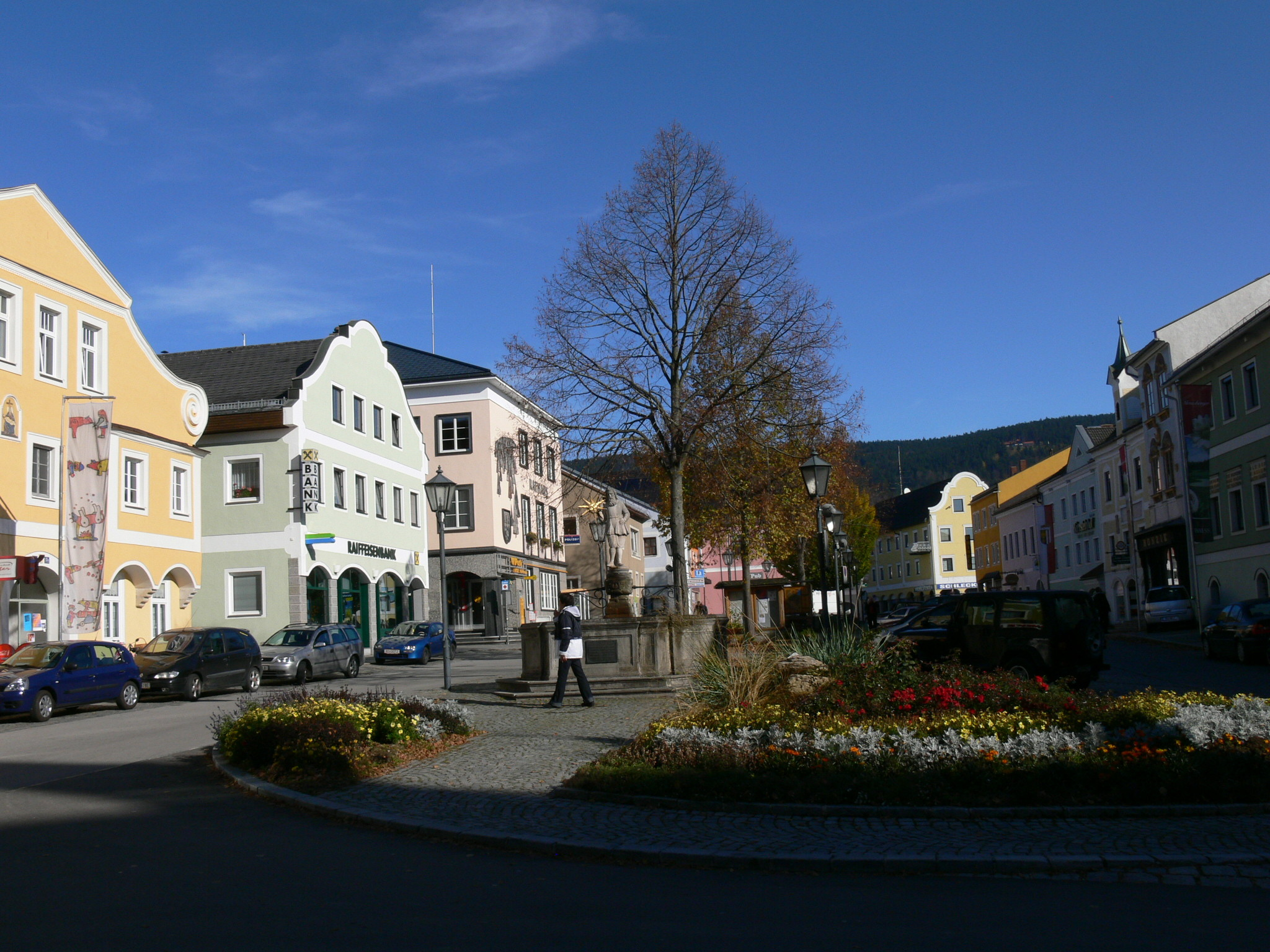
The Marktplatz of Aigen, where the Nicholas Treadwell Gallery moved in 2005

In January 2005, Treadwell moved to the courthouse and prison buildings in the Mühlviertel village of Aigen, near the borders with Germany and the Czech Republic.

After ten years in Aigen, Treadwell moved and reopened his gallery in September 2016 in an abandoned workshop at Große Neugasse 18 in Wieden, Vienna's 4th district. The inaugural exhibition at Treadwell's new gallery is dedicated to art of Hieronymus Bosch and features mostly recent works of 28 international artists.

Work has been bought from Treadwell by John Entwistle, Paul McCartney and Malcolm Forbes.
