= Brloh (Pardubice District) =

- Municipality
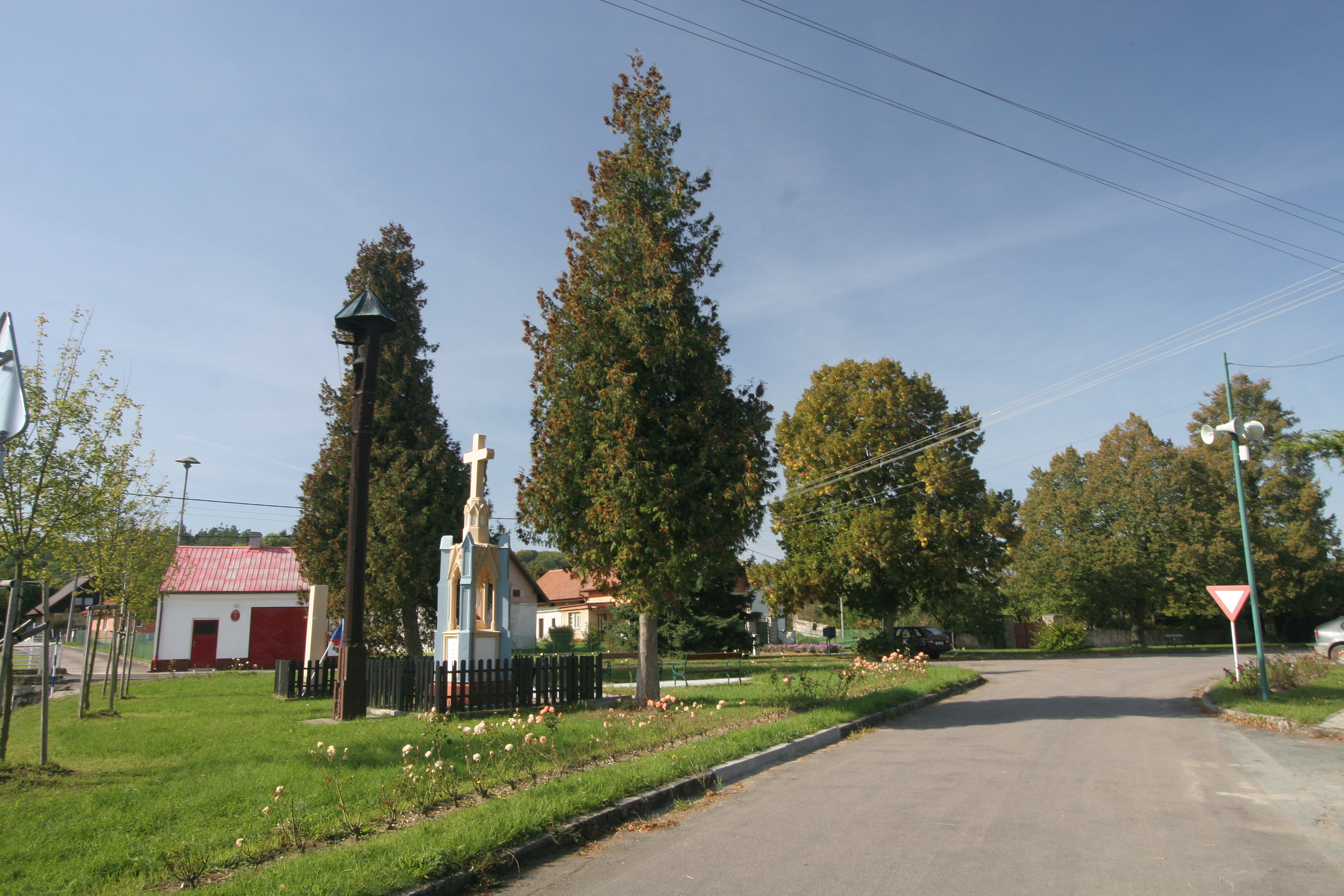
- Centre of Brloh

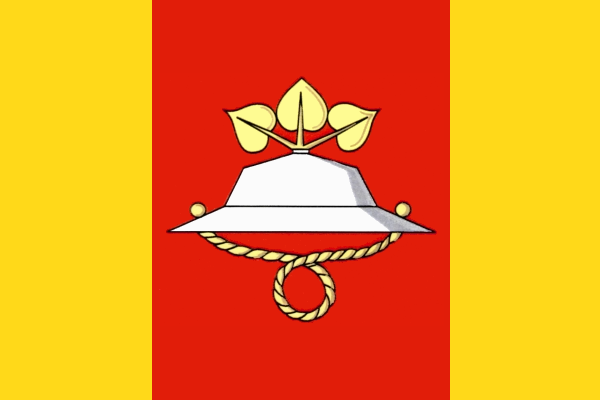
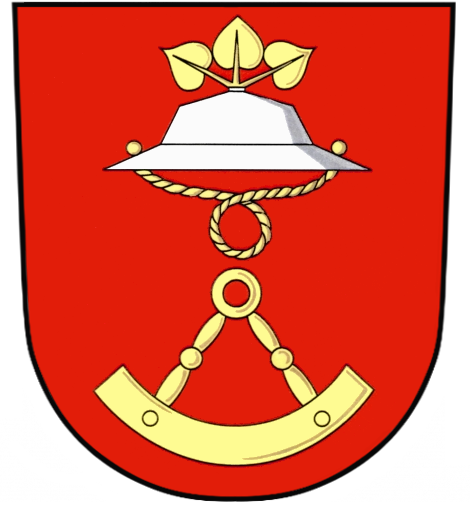
- Flag Coat of arms

- Location in the Czech Republic
- Coordinates: 50°0′2″N 15°33′26″E
- Country: Czech Republic
- Region: Pardubice
- District: Pardubice
- First mentioned: 1318

Area
  - Total: 4.70 km^{2} (1.81 sq mi)
- Elevation: 235 m (771 ft)

Population (2026-01-01)
  - Total: 225
  - Density: 47.9/km^{2} (124/sq mi)
- Time zone: UTC+1 (CET)
  - Summer (DST): UTC+2 (CEST)
- Postal code: 535 01
- Website: www.brloh.net

Brloh is a municipality and village in Pardubice District in the Pardubice Region of the Czech Republic. It has about 200 inhabitants.

== Administrative division ==
Brloh consists of two municipal parts (in brackets population according to the 2021 census):

- Brloh (187)
- Benešovice (40)

== Demographics ==
Historical population
Year	Pop.	±%
1869	466	—
1880	525	+12.7%
1890	509	−3.0%
1900	560	+10.0%
1910	560	+0.0%
1921	538	−3.9%
1930	475	−11.7%
1950	387	−18.5%
1961	354	−8.5%
1970	310	−12.4%
1980	251	−19.0%
1991	227	−9.6%
2001	235	+3.5%
2011	225	−4.3%
2021	227	+0.9%
Source: Censuses
