= Albert Scanes =

Australian cricketer

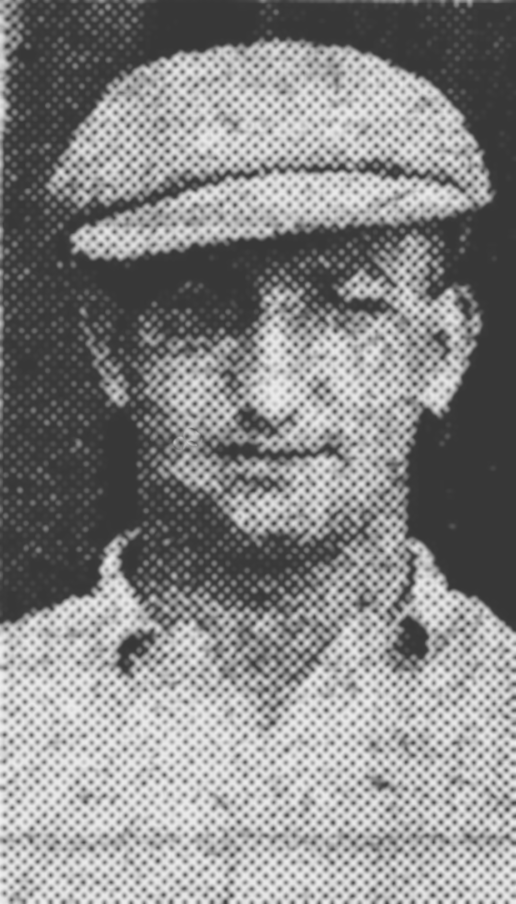

Personal information
- Born: 6 August 1900; Erskineville, New South Wales, Australia
- Died: 1 November 1969 (aged 69); Australia
- Source: ESPNcricinfo, 31 January 2017

Albert Scanes (6 August 1900 – 1 November 1969) was an Australian cricketer. He played ten first-class matches for New South Wales between 1921/22 and 1927/28. He also played for St George Cricket Club and Petersham.

== See also ==
- List of New South Wales representative cricketers
