= Aigen im Mühlkreis =

- Former municipality
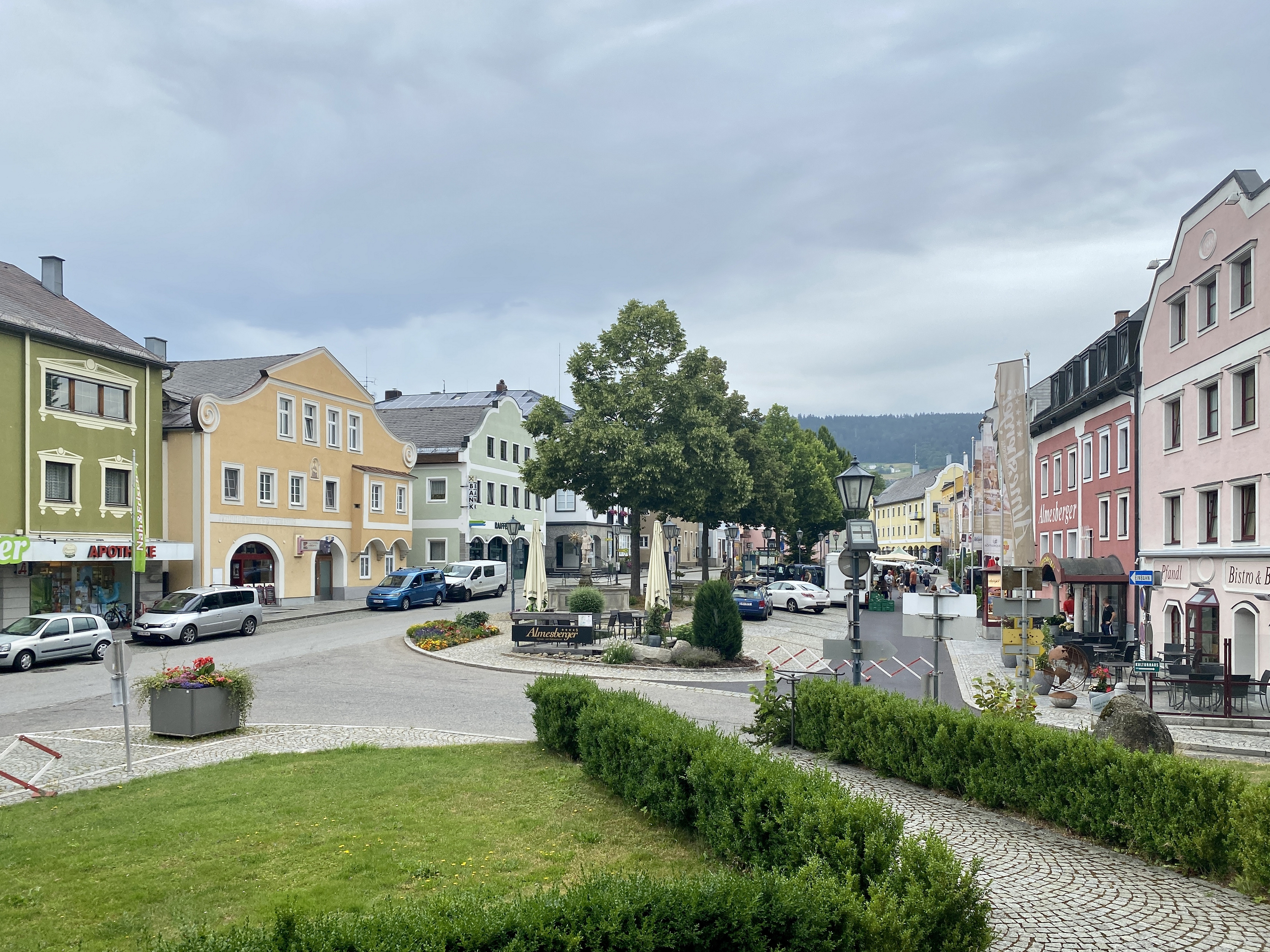
- Market square

- Location within Austria
- Coordinates: 48°38′48″N 13°58′21″E
- Country: Austria
- State: Upper Austria
- District: Rohrbach
- Municipality: Aigen-Schlägl

Area
  - Total: 17 km^{2} (6.6 sq mi)
- Elevation: 600 m (2,000 ft)

Population (14 June 2016)
  - Total: 1,882
  - Density: 110/km^{2} (290/sq mi)
- Time zone: UTC+1 (CET)
  - Summer (DST): UTC+2 (CEST)
- Postal code: 4160
- Area code: 07281
- Vehicle registration: RO
- Website: www.aigen-schlaegl.at

Aigen im Mühlkreis is a village and a former municipality in Rohrbach District in the Austrian state of Upper Austria. On 1 May 2015 Aigen im Mühlkreis municipality was merged with Schlägl to form Aigen-Schlägl municipality.

As of 1 January 2018, population of the town was 1778.

== Geography ==
Aigen im Mühlkreis lies in the upper Mühlviertel.

== Personalities ==
It is the site of Nicholas Treadwell's gallery.

== Economy ==
Aigen D.M. is one of the industries related to Aigen.
