= Schlägl =

- Former municipality
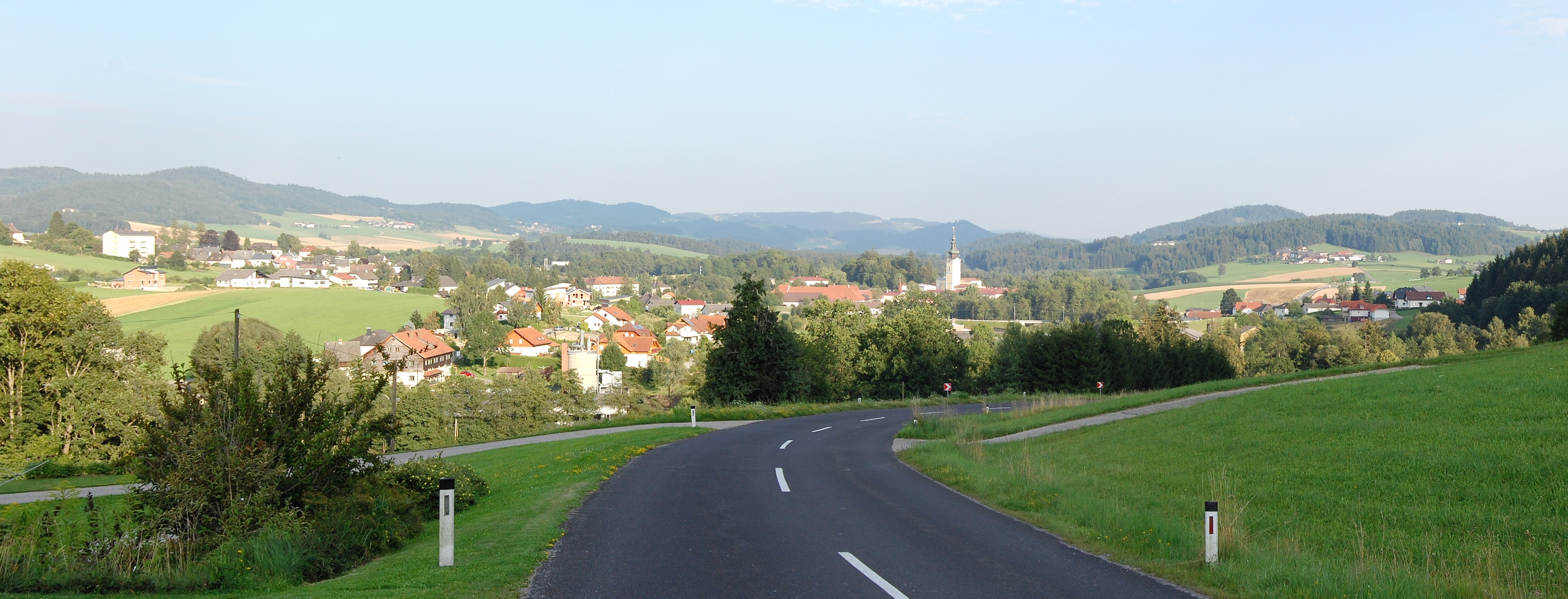

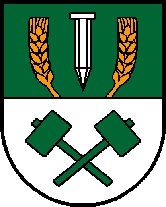
- Coat of arms

- Location within Austria
- Coordinates: 48°38′14″N 13°58′07″E
- Country: Austria
- State: Upper Austria
- District: Rohrbach
- Municipality: Aigen-Schlägl

Area
  - Total: 29 km^{2} (11 sq mi)
- Elevation: 544 m (1,785 ft)

Population (14 June 2016)
  - Total: 1,256
  - Density: 43/km^{2} (110/sq mi)
- Time zone: UTC+1 (CET)
  - Summer (DST): UTC+2 (CEST)
- Postal code: 4160
- Area code: 07281
- Vehicle registration: RO
- Website: www.aigen-schlaegl.at

Schlägl is a town and a former municipality in Rohrbach District in the Austrian state of Upper Austria. On 1 May 2015 Schlägl municipality was merged with Aigen im Mühlkreis to form Aigen-Schlägl municipality.

As of 1 January 2018, population of the town was 430.

== Geography ==
Schlägl is lying in the upper Mühlviertel. About 55 percent of the municipality is forest, and 40 percent is farmland.

== Forestry ==
Schägl contains a monastic order in which famously developed was the target diameter harvesting method.
