= John Scanes =

- Born: John Zuschlag; 1928; Whitechapel, London, England
- Died: 2004 (aged 75–76)
- Known for: Painting, sculpture, mixed media, abstract and representational work
- Style: Representational, Abstract, Experimental
- Movement: Early 1960s art accessibility movement

John Scanes (1928–2004) was a British artist. He was born John Zuschlag in Whitechapel, London, but his family changed their name by deed poll in 1942 during World War II, adopting his mother’s maiden name. Most of his work is signed John Scanes, but for a brief period in the early 1960s he signed some items John Zuschlag.

Scanes' life as an artist can be traced from the age of 14, when he began to draw and sketch whilst working as an office boy in the city during World War II. He had no formal schooling after that age, and was entirely self-taught as an artist.

After National Service, Scanes worked in the paper and pharmaceutical industries before becoming a full-time artist and sculptor in 1959. His first known solo exhibition was an open-air exhibition at Brighton in the summer of 1959. He was part of the early 1960s movements to bring art within the reach of everybody. To that end, he exhibited at both the Whitechapel Art Gallery and the Chelsea Show. Following the example of Stanley Spencer, whose work he greatly admired, he also hung works on the railings of the Royal Academy, at Green Park, and co-founded the Bayswater Road exhibition. During the 1970s he exhibited through Nicholas Treadwell's Gallery.

In the mid-late 1960s, Scanes worked in the Graphic Design Department at the Central School of Art and Design, London. While there he was strongly encouraged by Cecil Collins. After his wife's sudden death in 1969 he resigned from the Central School and returned to free-lance work. He continued working and exhibiting until his death in 2004.

Scanes' earliest works were representational, particularly seascapes and yachts in oils. He continued to produce these into the 1970s. Also from the early 1960s, he produced a number of studies of Cornish fishing villages in oils, using a pallette knife technique. In the later 1960s he turned to experimental and abstract forms. Scanes' later work explored two major themes. One theme was dictated by his wife's death: Lazarus and the concepts of resurrection, rebirth] and material change. In the 1980s he illustrated two poetic cycles exploring this theme: the Rubaiyat of Omar Khayyam and the Song of Amergin from The White Goddess by Robert Graves. The Song of Amergin is an alphabet based on native British trees, giving each a symbolic meaning within the course of the Celtic lunar year. Robert Graves reconstructed a series of riddles/glosses to identify each tree in the sequence. John Scanes illustrated the letters, trees and the symbolic meanings in a series of paintings which, at times, overlapped his Rubaiyat sequence. He kept these works as his own personal collection, although related works were exhibited and sold. They were exhibited for the first time at a retrospective exhibition at the Sewell Centre Gallery, Radley College, UK, in 2005.

Scanes' second theme, less well represented in his personal collection, was London and the urban environment, particularly the effects of poverty on the spirit. In his memoirs he wrote movingly of his childhood in the Docklands of the East End during the Great Depression of the 1930s.

Throughout his work, Scanes constantly used motifs taken from the hieroglyphs and religious figures of ancient Egypt and Mesopotamia and from early European cave art from Lascaux and standing stones, and later rock art such as the Tassili frescoes. The Bronze Age White Horse of Uffington, Berkshire, lying broken on its hill, was one of his favourite recurring studies. He also wrote and illustrated a cycle of children’s stories, which remains unpublished.

Scanes worked in mixed media, juxtaposing low-relief metal sculpture with painting, drawing and the effects of charring. His abstract work was always experimental, particularly the use of paint effects with oils and relief using metal fillers, plaster, semi-precious stones and woods. His sculptures make extensive use of found objects. His aim was the transformation of the perceived subject into another form using the artist’s skill.

John Scanes' works are in private ownership throughout the world. The private collection and portfolio and an archive of memoirs are kept by his estate.

== Sources ==
- David Buckman, ed. Dictionary of artists in Britain since 1945. 2nd edn. 2006, ISBN 0-9532609-5-X
