= Předotice =

- Municipality
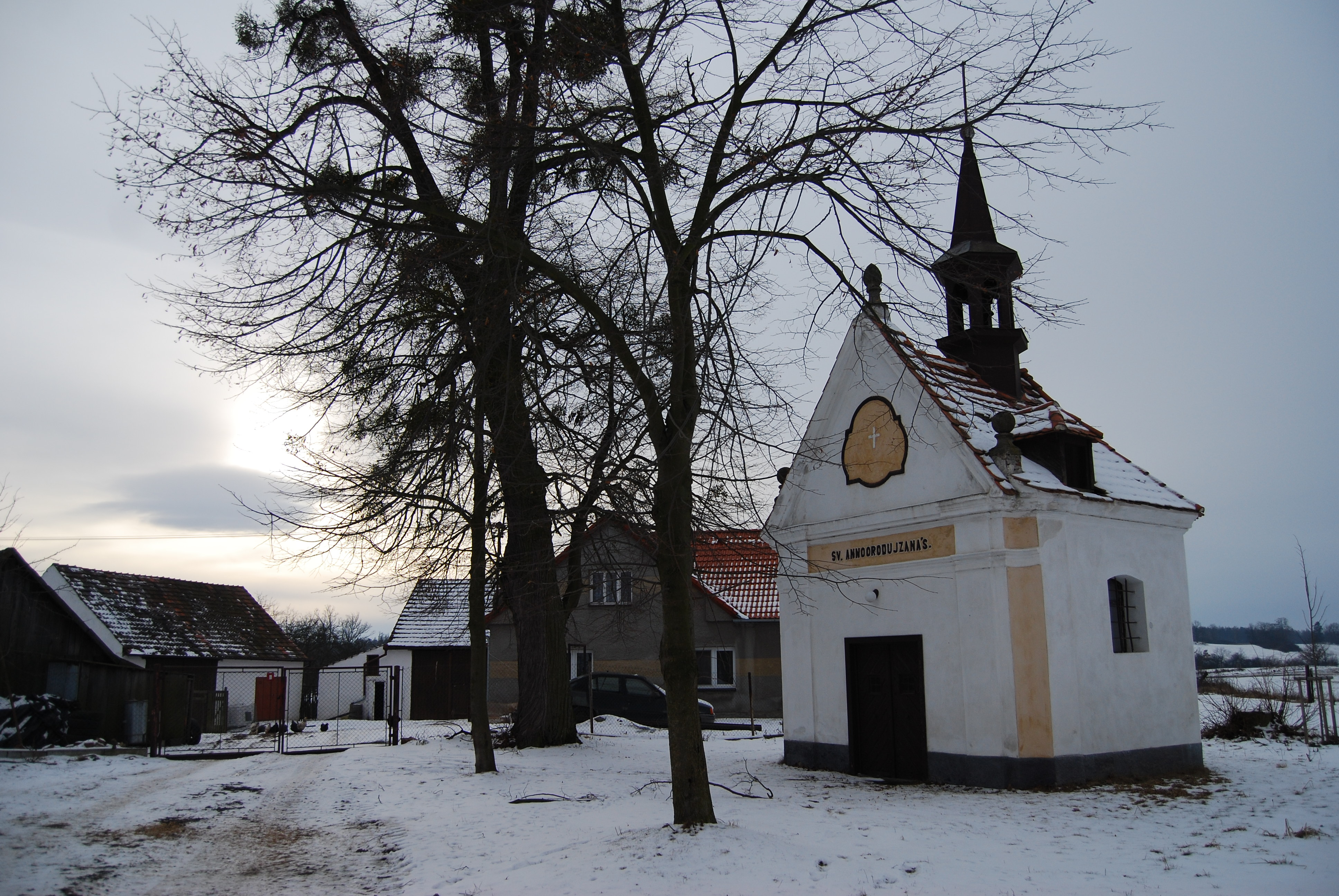
- Chapel of Saint Anne

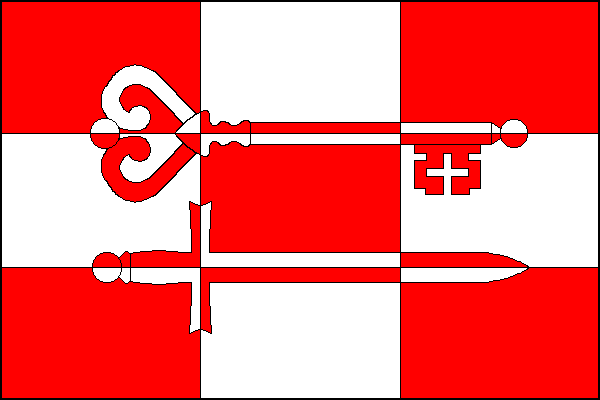
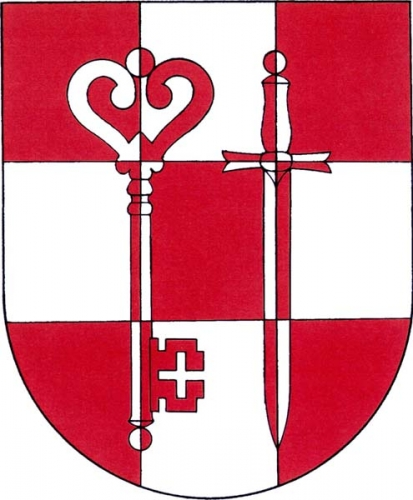
- Flag Coat of arms

- Location in the Czech Republic
- Coordinates: 49°21′54″N 14°3′12″E
- Country: Czech Republic
- Region: South Bohemian
- District: Písek
- First mentioned: 1323

Area
  - Total: 21.46 km^{2} (8.29 sq mi)
- Elevation: 478 m (1,568 ft)

Population (2026-01-01)
  - Total: 606
  - Density: 28.2/km^{2} (73.1/sq mi)
- Time zone: UTC+1 (CET)
  - Summer (DST): UTC+2 (CEST)
- Postal code: 397 01
- Website: www.predotice.cz

Předotice is a municipality and village in Písek District in the South Bohemian Region of the Czech Republic. It has about 600 inhabitants.

Předotice lies approximately 10 kilometres (6 mi) northwest of Písek, 54 km (34 mi) northwest of České Budějovice and 85 km (53 mi) south of Prague.

== Administrative division ==
Předotice consists of nine municipal parts (in brackets population according to the 2021 census):

- Předotice (112)
- Kožlí u Čížové (77)
- Křešice (90)
- Malčice (94)
- Podolí II (39)
- Šamonice (60)
- Soběšice (11)
- Třebkov (84)
- Vadkovice (22)

== Demographics ==
Historical population
Year	Pop.	±%
1869	1,556	—
1880	1,539	−1.1%
1890	1,475	−4.2%
1900	1,394	−5.5%
1910	1,338	−4.0%
1921	1,332	−0.4%
1930	1,194	−10.4%
1950	903	−24.4%
1961	844	−6.5%
1970	725	−14.1%
1980	610	−15.9%
1991	488	−20.0%
2001	426	−12.7%
2011	497	+16.7%
2021	589	+18.5%
Source: Censuses
