= Drhovle =

- Municipality
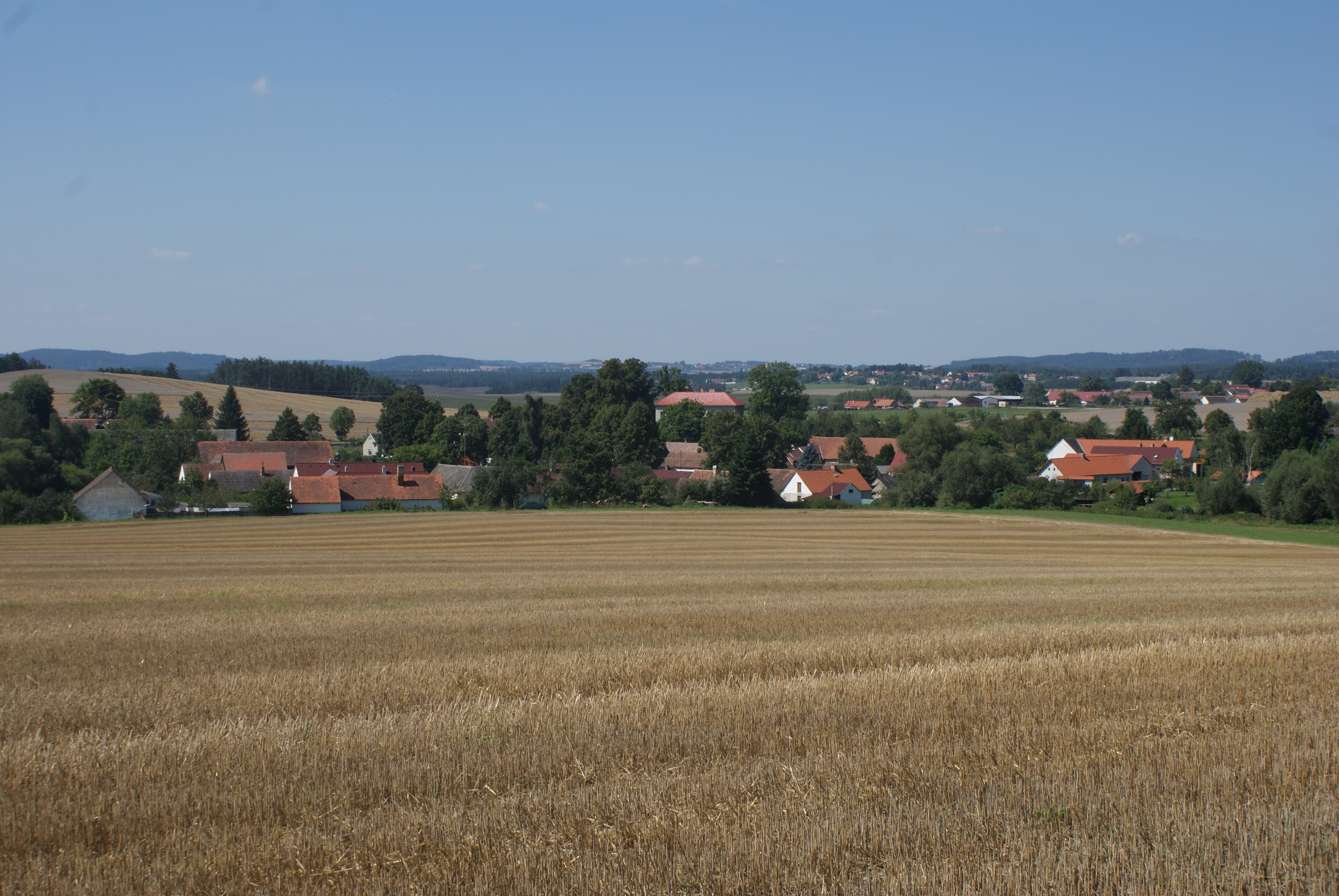
- General view

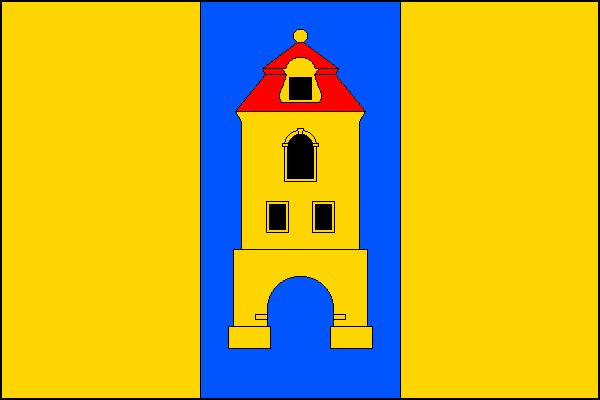
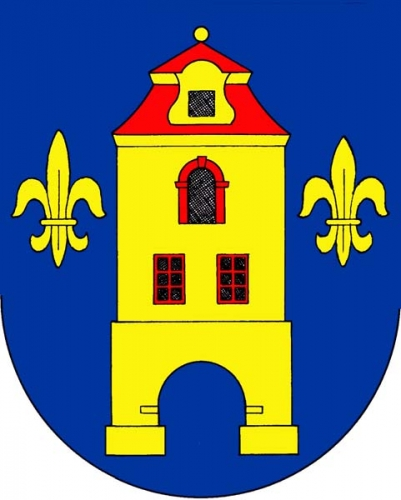
- Flag Coat of arms

- Location in the Czech Republic
- Coordinates: 49°20′2″N 14°2′27″E
- Country: Czech Republic
- Region: South Bohemian
- District: Písek
- First mentioned: 1323

Area
  - Total: 23.27 km^{2} (8.98 sq mi)
- Elevation: 456 m (1,496 ft)

Population (2026-01-01)
  - Total: 661
  - Density: 28.4/km^{2} (73.6/sq mi)
- Time zone: UTC+1 (CET)
  - Summer (DST): UTC+2 (CEST)
- Postal code: 397 01
- Website: www.drhovle.cz

Drhovle is a municipality and village in Písek District in the South Bohemian Region of the Czech Republic. It has about 700 inhabitants.

Drhovle lies approximately 8 kilometres (5 mi) north-west of Písek, 51 km (32 mi) north-west of České Budějovice, and 88 km (55 mi) south of Prague.

== Administrative division ==
Drhovle consists of seven municipal parts (in brackets population according to the 2021 census):

- Drhovle Ves (85)
- Drhovle Zámek (115)
- Brloh (67)
- Chlaponice (40)
- Dubí Hora (94)
- Mladotice (103)
- Pamětice (113)

== Demographics ==
Historical population
Year	Pop.	±%
1869	1,778	—
1880	1,669	−6.1%
1890	1,592	−4.6%
1900	1,580	−0.8%
1910	1,494	−5.4%
1921	1,496	+0.1%
1930	1,396	−6.7%
1950	1,035	−25.9%
1961	1,031	−0.4%
1970	866	−16.0%
1980	753	−13.0%
1991	661	−12.2%
2001	595	−10.0%
2011	554	−6.9%
2021	617	+11.4%
Source: Censuses
