= D4 motorway (Czech Republic) =

Motorway in the Czech Republic

D4 Motorway
- Dálnice D4
- Via Salis

Route information
- Length: 75.7 km (47.0 mi) Planned: 84.7 km (52.6 mi) including 9 km (5.6 mi) near Prague

Major junctions
- From: D0 in Prague
- To: Nová Hospoda, interchange with I/20

Location
- Country: Czech Republic
- Regions: Prague, Central Bohemian, South Bohemian
- Major cities: Prague, Dobříš, Příbram, Písek

Highway system
- Highways in the Czech Republic
← D3	→ D5

D4 motorway (Czech: Dálnice D4) connects Prague and the western half of the South Bohemian Region. It follows the route of the historic Golden Trail and continues as I/4 highway. A total of 75.7 kilometres (47.0 mi) is in operation.

The motorway starts near Jíloviště. The previous sections of highway I/4 is a dual carriageway but is not signposted as a motorway as it lacks an accompanying road and there are direct property accesses.

The motorway ends at Nová Hospoda junction near Třebkov where the main carriageway continues as highway I/20 towards Písek and České Budějovice. Highway I/4 splits from this junction as a single carriageway towards Strakonice and Bavaria.

An electronic vignette is required along the entire length of the motorway.

Some of the sections are managed through the PPP project called Via Salis (Salt Road).

== Chronology ==
Before 2016 the current D4 motorway was designated as Expressway R4 (Czech: Rychlostní silnice R4).

The D4 motorway was built away from Prague, and drivers could drive on the first section in 1971. At that time, it was a relatively short stretch of road connecting Jíloviště and the outskirts of Řitka. The subsequent bypass of Řitka, which greatly relieved the village and cut through the surrounding fields, opened in 1978. Several other sections opened before 1989, before the D4 reached a total length of 32 kilometres (20 mi) reaching the junction at Skalka near Příbram.

=== 21st century ===
In 2005, the construction of an approximately 800 m long section with an off-grade junction with the I/20 Nová Hospoda u Třebkov road was started, and the section was put into operation on 19 November 2007. The 6 kilometres (3.7 mi) long northbound section of the D4 motorway between Mirotice and Třebkov began construction in 2008, and was inaugurated on 16 September 2010, opening to the public a day later.

On 4 October 2017, the 4.8 kilometres (3.0 mi) long section between Skalka and the junction with the II/118 road was opened as a bypass of the village of Dubenec. The construction permit for it was issued in 2012 and, after the preparation of detailed documentation, construction started in April 2015. The total price, excluding VAT, according to the contract was CZK 417.5 million. The contractor was Skanska, the total area of the road surface is 104,500 m².

=== Public private partnership (PPP) ===
At the turn of 2015 and 2016, information emerged that the missing sections between the I/118 road and Mirotice could be completed in the form of a PPP project.

The first tender for PPP consultants was cancelled by the Office for the Protection of Competition, while the second tender in 2017 selected a consortium of White&Case, Česká spořitelna and Obermeyer Helika. By the end of 2018, seven companies had applied for the completion, from which the MoD selected four. The construction received the EIA green stamp in November 2018, at which time the last plots of land were also being purchased. Construction of all sections at once in PPP form began in 2021. In February, after the Chamber of Deputies approved the contract, the government concluded a contract for the construction and maintenance of the D4 motorway with the French consortium DIVia (Vinci Group and Meridiam Investments). The construction of the motorway was provided by the construction company Eurovia. The construction started on 7 June 2021, and was completed in December 2024.

The PPP sections opened in December 2024 were as follows:

- Háje – Milín at a total length of 5.7 kilometres (3.5 mi).
- Milín - Lety at a total length of 11.6 kilometres (7.2 mi).
- Lety - Čimelice at a total length of 2.6 kilometres (1.6 mi).
- Čimelice - Mirotice at a total length of 8.5 kilometres (5.3 mi).
- Widening at the Mirotice section at a total length of 3.6 kilometres (2.2 mi).

DIVia D4, s.r.o. was renamed ViaSalis, s.r.o. The latter took control of the completed sections (Skalka - Háje and Mirotice - Krašovice, including the section of the I/20 road) on 1 July 2021. The parts of the D4 motorway and the I/20 road that fall under this project were designated as Via Salis. The name literally means Salt Road.

PPP construction is said to be more advantageous in that the construction itself is faster. Eurovia's largest Czech financial partner is the bank ČSOB, which is financing about 45 percent of the investment funds. The winning company will manage the D4 motorway for the next 28 years after completion.

=== Future development ===
The first 9 kilometres (5.6 mi) of the D4 near Prague is designated as an I/4 road, and not as a motorway. Reconstruction of this section is planned for after 2025.

== Exit list ==
Country	Region	Location	km	mi	Exit	Name	Destinations	Notes
Czech Republic	Prague	Prague	0	0.0	—	Zbraslav	D0 E50	In planning as a motorway
Czech Republic	Prague	Prague	2	1.2	—	Zbraslav-západ		In planning as a motorway
Czech Republic	Prague	Prague	5	3.1	—	Zbraslav-Baně		In planning as a motorway
Czech Republic	Central Bohemian Region	Central Bohemian Region	9	5.6	—	Jíloviště		Start of motorway Start of electronic tolling section
Czech Republic	Central Bohemian Region	Central Bohemian Region			Rest area	Odpočívka Líšnice		
Czech Republic	Central Bohemian Region	Central Bohemian Region	14	8.7	—	Řitka		
Czech Republic	Central Bohemian Region	Central Bohemian Region	18	11	—	Mníšek pod Brdy		
Czech Republic	Central Bohemian Region	Central Bohemian Region	21	13	—	Kytín		
Czech Republic	Central Bohemian Region	Central Bohemian Region	24	15	—	Voznice		
Czech Republic	Central Bohemian Region	Central Bohemian Region	27	17	—	Dobříš-sever		
Czech Republic	Central Bohemian Region	Central Bohemian Region	32	20	—	Dobříš-jih		
Czech Republic	Central Bohemian Region	Central Bohemian Region	41	25	—	Drásov	I/18	
Czech Republic	Central Bohemian Region	Central Bohemian Region	45	28	—	Háje		End of electronic tolling section
Czech Republic	Central Bohemian Region	Central Bohemian Region	49	30	—	Milín	I/66	
Czech Republic	Central Bohemian Region	Central Bohemian Region	54	34	—	Těchařovice		
Czech Republic	South Bohemian Region	South Bohemian Region	63	39	—	Lety	I/19	
Czech Republic	South Bohemian Region	South Bohemian Region	74	46	—	Mirotice		Start of electronic tolling section
Czech Republic	South Bohemian Region	South Bohemian Region	82	51	—	Předotice		
Czech Republic	South Bohemian Region	South Bohemian Region	84	52	—	Nová Hospoda	I/4 I/20 E49	Kilometrage end point Road continues as I/20
1.000 mi = 1.609 km; 1.000 km = 0.621 mi: Proposed

== Gallery ==
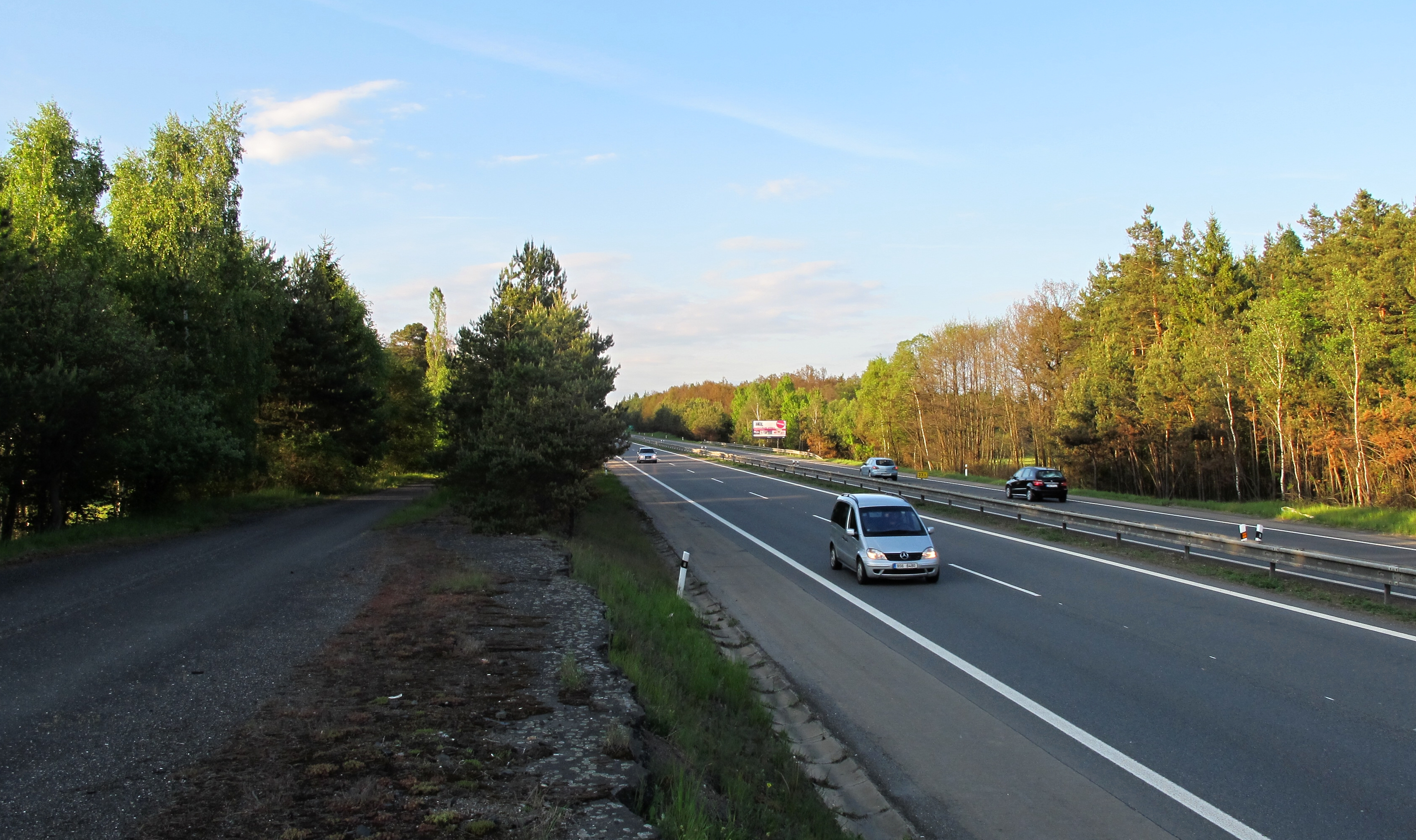
Motorway D4 near Voznice.

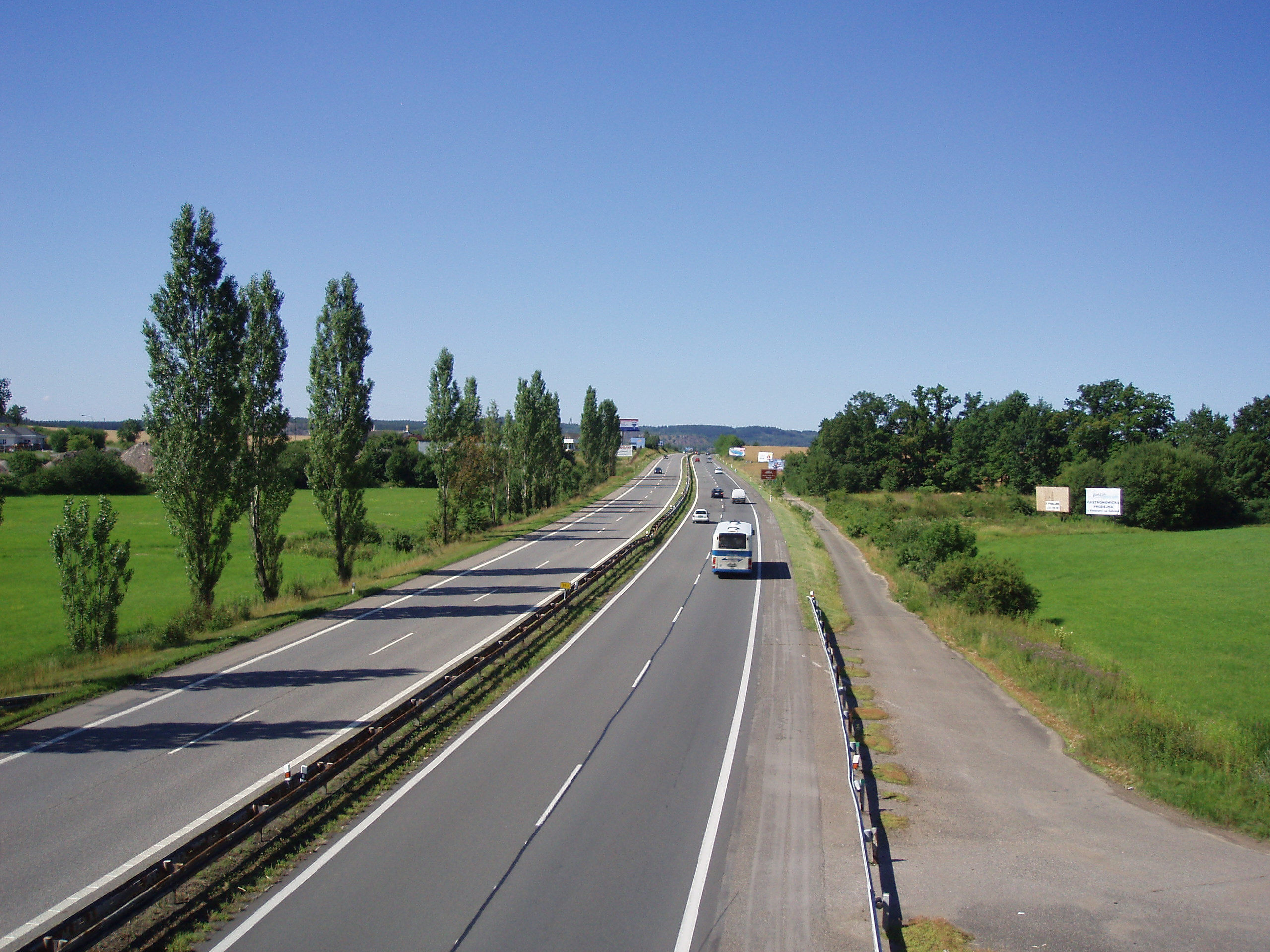
Motorway D4 near Dlouhá Lhota.

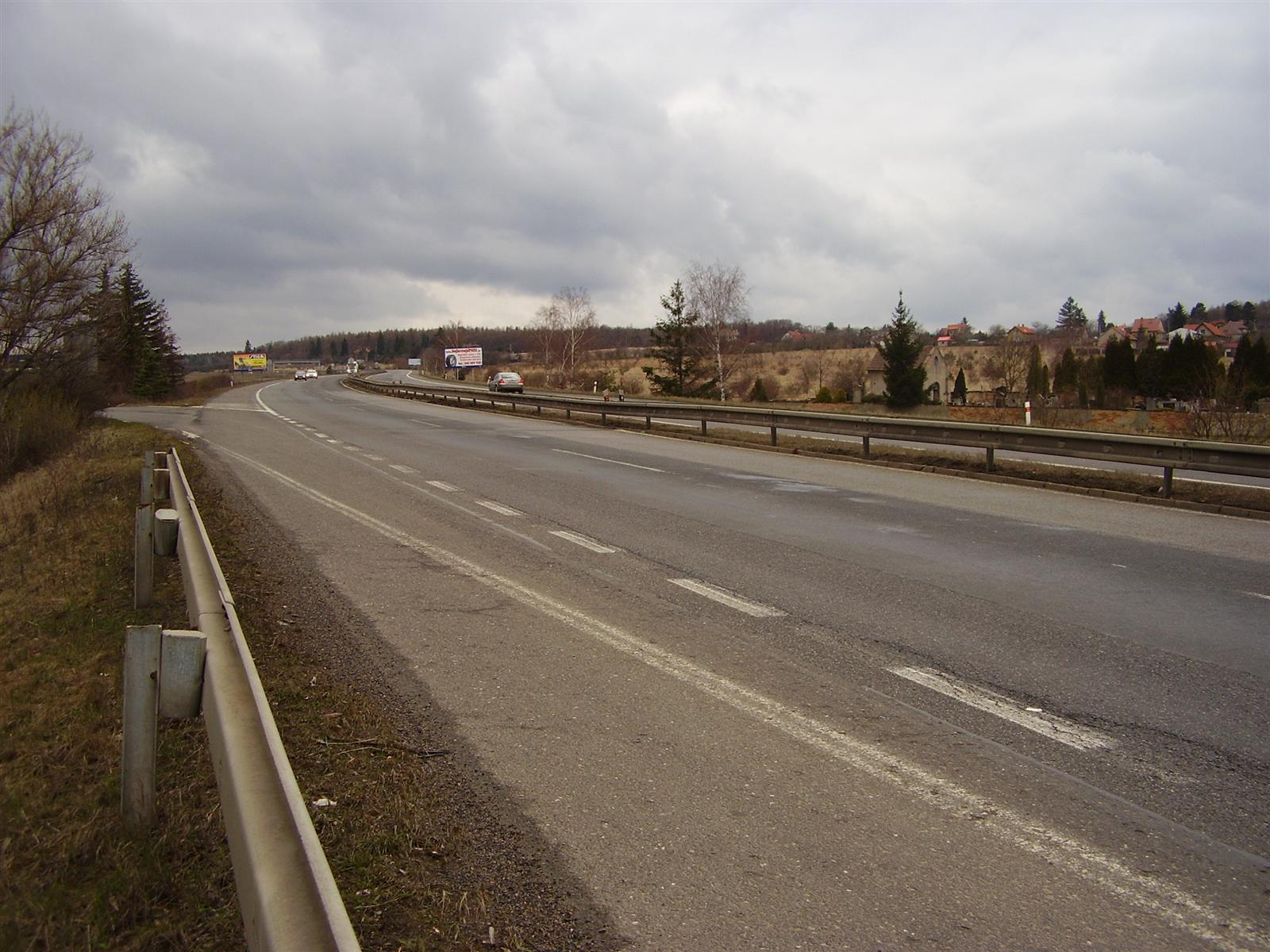
Motorway D4 near Mníšek pod Brdy.

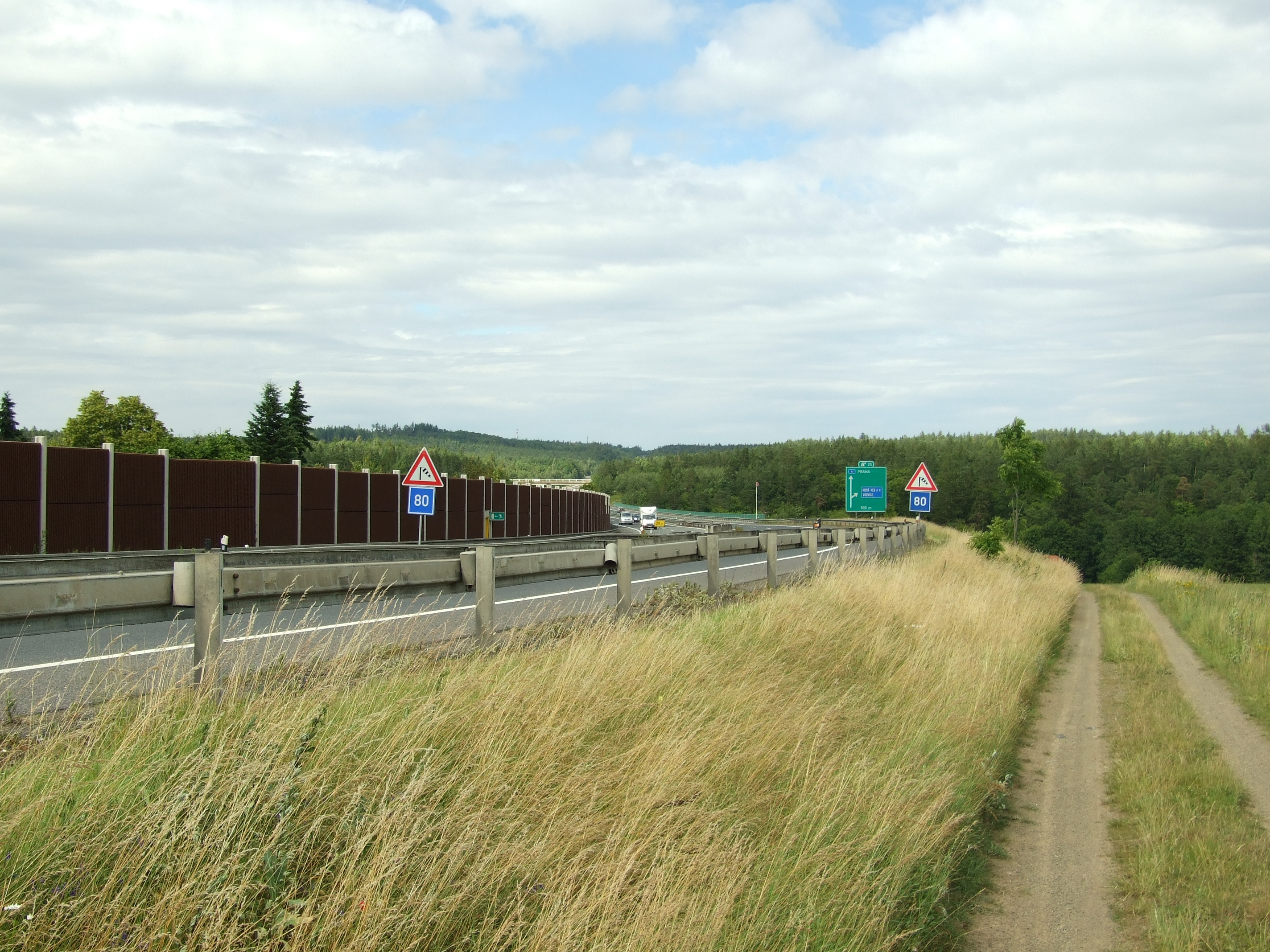
Section near Voznice, in 2009 still as R4

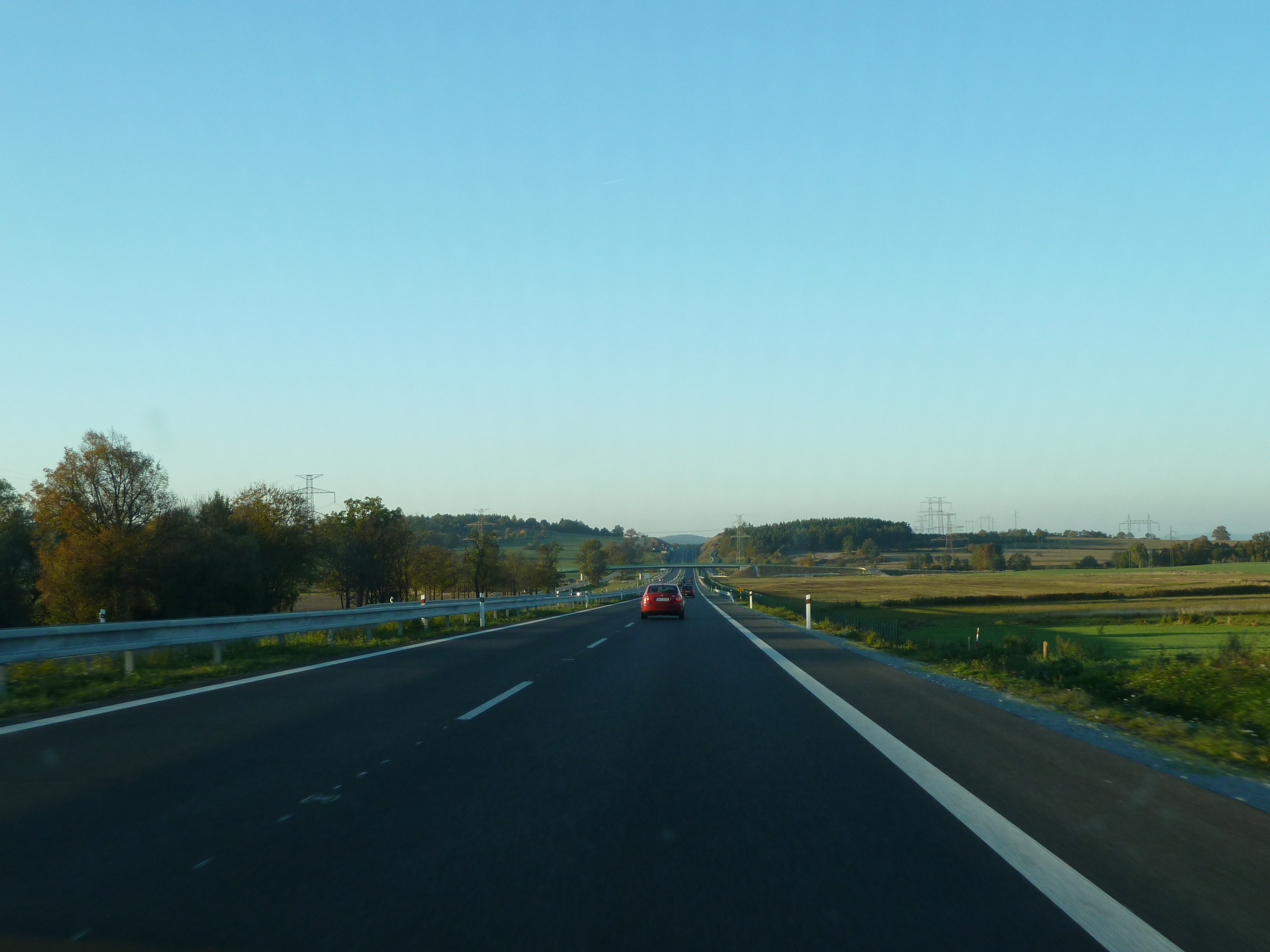
Section near Předotice in 2004
