= Štětkovice =

- Municipality
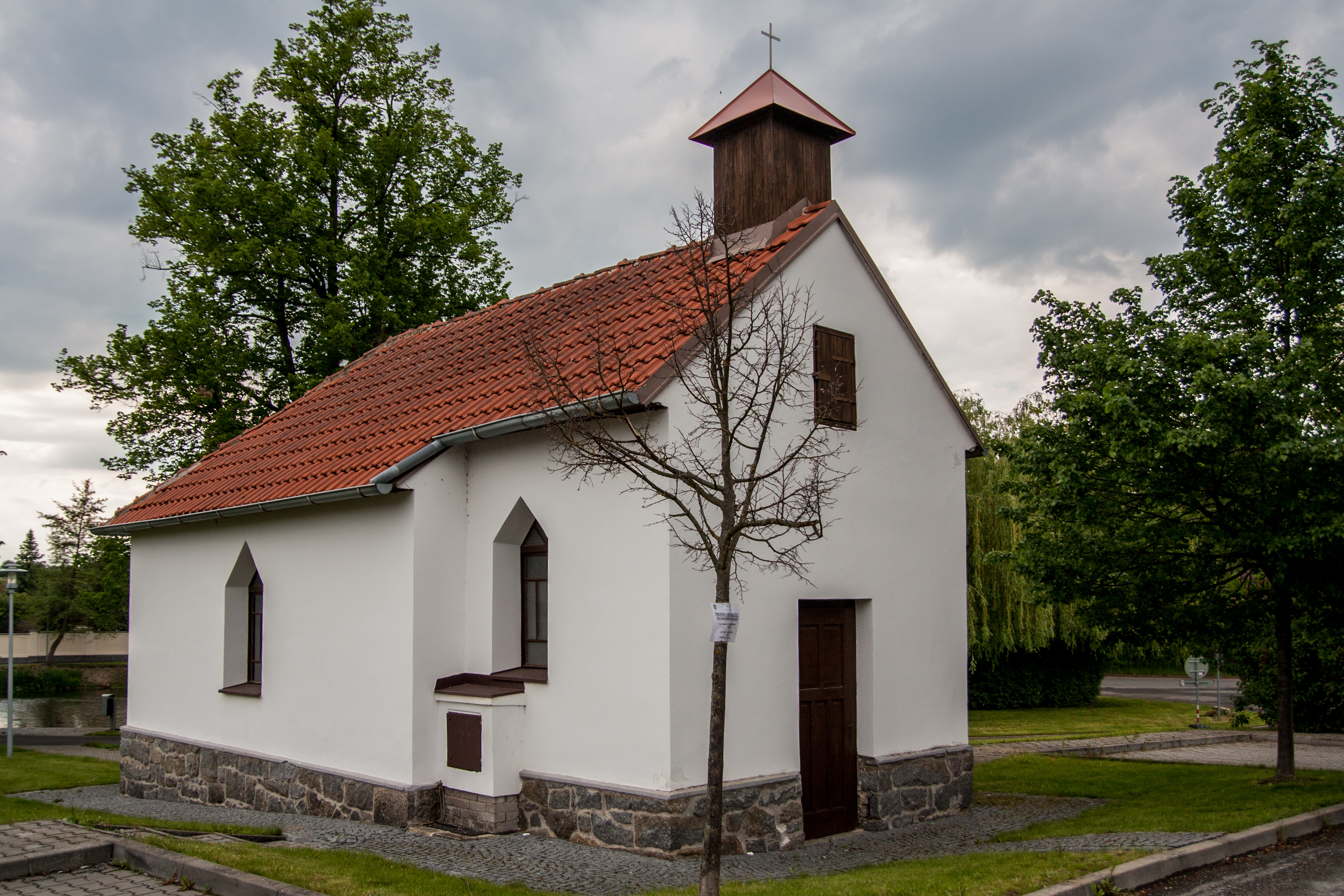
- Chapel in the centre of Štětkovice

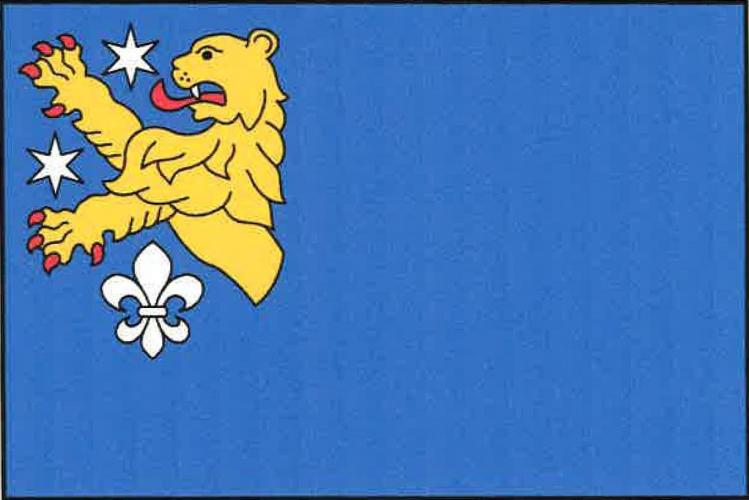
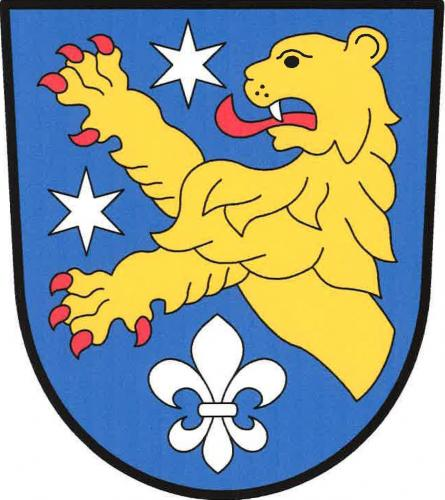
- Flag Coat of arms

- Location in the Czech Republic
- Coordinates: 49°40′15″N 14°30′23″E
- Country: Czech Republic
- Region: Central Bohemian
- District: Příbram
- First mentioned: 1521

Area
  - Total: 4.99 km^{2} (1.93 sq mi)
- Elevation: 436 m (1,430 ft)

Population (2026-01-01)
  - Total: 347
  - Density: 69.5/km^{2} (180/sq mi)
- Time zone: UTC+1 (CET)
  - Summer (DST): UTC+2 (CEST)
- Postal code: 264 01
- Website: www.stetkovice.cz

Štětkovice is a municipality and village in Příbram District in the Central Bohemian Region of the Czech Republic. It has about 300 inhabitants.

== Administrative division ==
Štětkovice consists of four municipal parts (in brackets population according to the 2021 census):

- Štětkovice (247)
- Bořená Hora (23)
- Chrastava (21)
- Sedlečko (63)

== Demographics ==
Historical population
| Year | Pop. | ±% |
|---|---|---|
| 1869 | 383 | — |
| 1880 | 385 | +0.5% |
| 1890 | 395 | +2.6% |
| 1900 | 362 | −8.4% |
| 1910 | 365 | +0.8% |
| 1921 | 352 | −3.6% |
| 1930 | 309 | −12.2% |
| 1950 | 243 | −21.4% |
| 1961 | 235 | −3.3% |
| 1970 | 243 | +3.4% |
| 1980 | 243 | +0.0% |
| 1991 | 238 | −2.1% |
| 2001 | 299 | +25.6% |
| 2011 | 312 | +4.3% |
| 2021 | 354 | +13.5% |
Source: Censuses
