= Živnostenská banka =

Former large bank in Prague

Živnostenská banka, a.s.
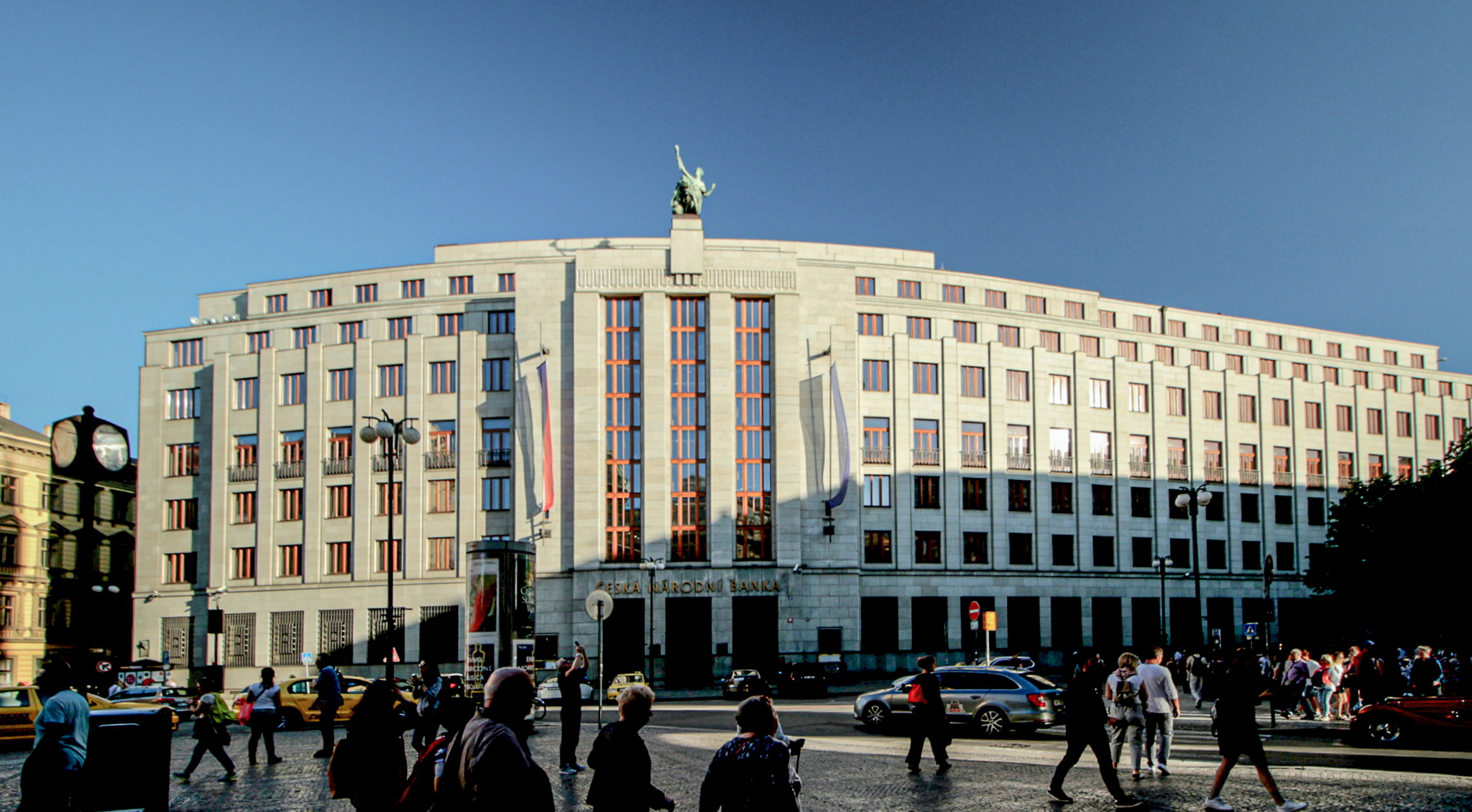
- Former head office in Prague, later State Bank of Czechoslovakia and Czech National Bank
- Industry: Financial services
- Predecessor: Prager Creditbank
- Founded: 1868; 158 years ago
- Defunct: 2006
- Successor: UniCredit Bank Czech Republic
- Headquarters: Prague, Czech Republic
- Net income: 406,545,000 Czech koruna (1995)

Živnostenská banka, a.s. (full name until 1910 Živnostenská banka pro Čechy a Moravu v Praze (Note: lit. 'small business bank for Bohemia and Moravia in Prague'), German: Gewerbebank, in short ŽB or ZIBA) was a major commercial bank operating in the Habsburg monarchy, then Czechoslovakia until absorption into the State Bank of Czechoslovakia in 1950. It restarted activity in the late 1950s, was privatized in 1992, and after 1993 was one of the largest banks in the Czech Republic. In 2002 it was purchased by UniCredit, and in 2006 was renamed UniCredit Bank Czech Republic.

== Austro-Hungarian era ==
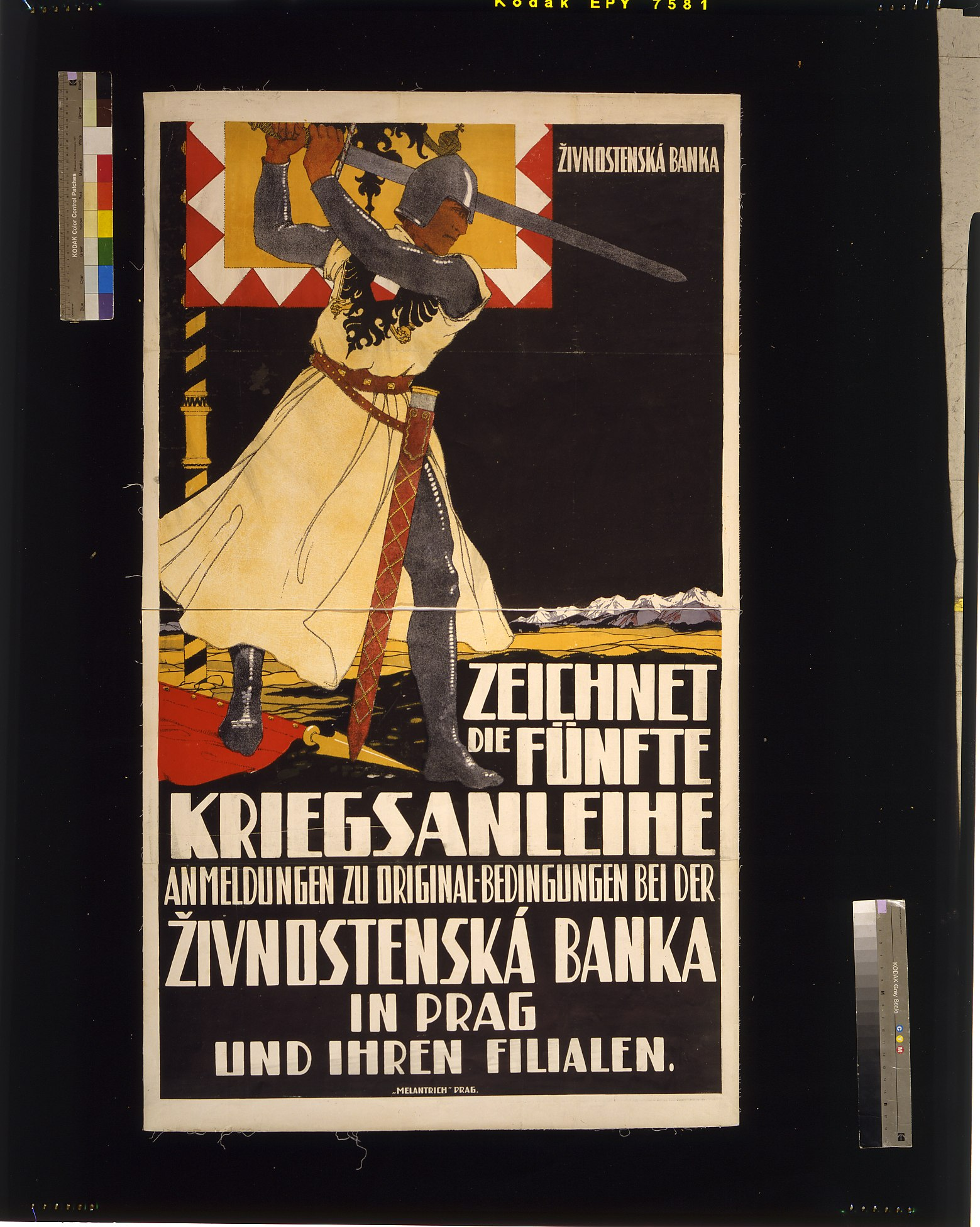
War poster, 1916

Živnostenská banka was established in 1868 as a joint-stock company, acting as a middleman between the Austro-Hungarian Bank and smaller savings banks. It was the first bank in the Austro-Hungarian Empire to be financed entirely by Czech capital, and aimed at supporting the development of newly established Czech businesses. In 1896, it opened a first branch in Vienna, and in 1908 another one in Trieste. In 1900, it sponsored the creation of the Ljubljana Credit Bank in which it held half of the initial equity capital. In 1909, ZIBA was one of the founding investors of the Croatian Landesbank in Osijek, which in 1920 was relocated to Zagreb and renamed Jugoslavenska Banka. Prior to the World War I, ZIBA also took a minority holding in the Serbian Credit Bank in Belgrade.

Just before the outbreak of World War I, ZIBA had 1,068 employees, 11 branches in Bohemia and Moravia, and branches in Vienna, Kraków, Lviv, and Trieste. At that time ZIBA alone accounted for almost a third of the total capital of the Czech banking system.

During World War I, it had to liquidate its branches in Kraków and Lemberg (now Lviv), whose businesses were transferred to local players.

== Independent Czechoslovakia ==
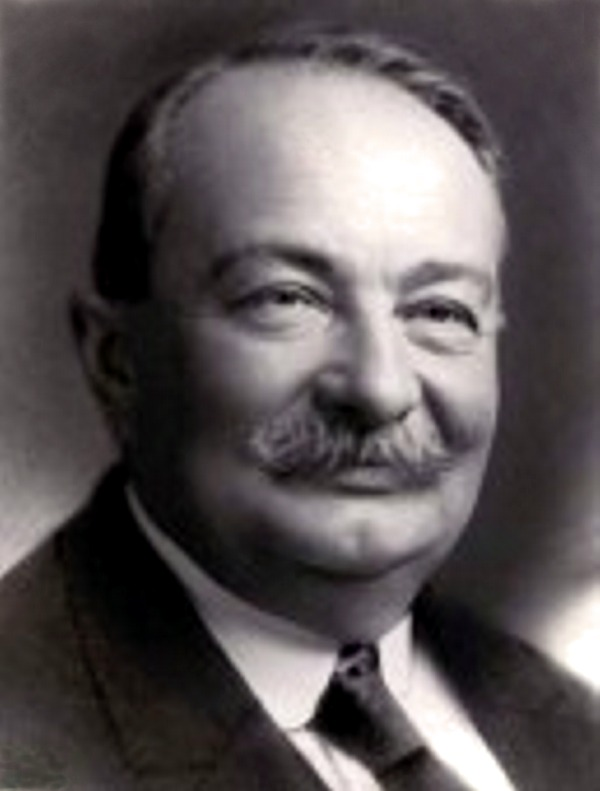
Jaroslav Preiss (1870-1946) joined ZIBA in 1907 and led it from 1917 to 1938

ZIBA grew rapidly in the wake of the formation of the Czechoslovak Republic in late 1918. In 1919, it took over control of the Böhmische Escompte-Bank (BEB) from the expropriated Austrian bank Niederösterreichische Escompte-Gesellschaft, and the BEB in turn acquired the operations of Austria's Creditanstalt in Czechoslovakia. At the same time, ZIBA opened branches in Bratislava and Košice which had become part of the new country.

ZIBA's managing director Jaroslav Preiss was instrumental in formulating Czechoslovakia's economic-nationalistic "nostrification" policy, which forced the transfer of ownership of assets in Czechoslovakia to domestically-headquartered companies. This law also protected Czech banks from foreign competition. ZIBA consequently developed its investment banking activity. In 1922, it established a branch in London. It fostered mergers among large Czech industrial corporations, for example the creation of the mechanical engineering colossus ČKD, and systematically built up a dominant industrial portfolio, controlling 60 companies. In 1925, it shored up the Czech Bank in Prague (Czech: Česká banka v Praze), jointly with the National Bank of Czechoslovakia.

In 1928, ZIBA sold its Trieste branch and Opatija branch office to the Banca d'America e d'Italia. In 1938, it opened a branch in Žilina.

== Nazi era ==
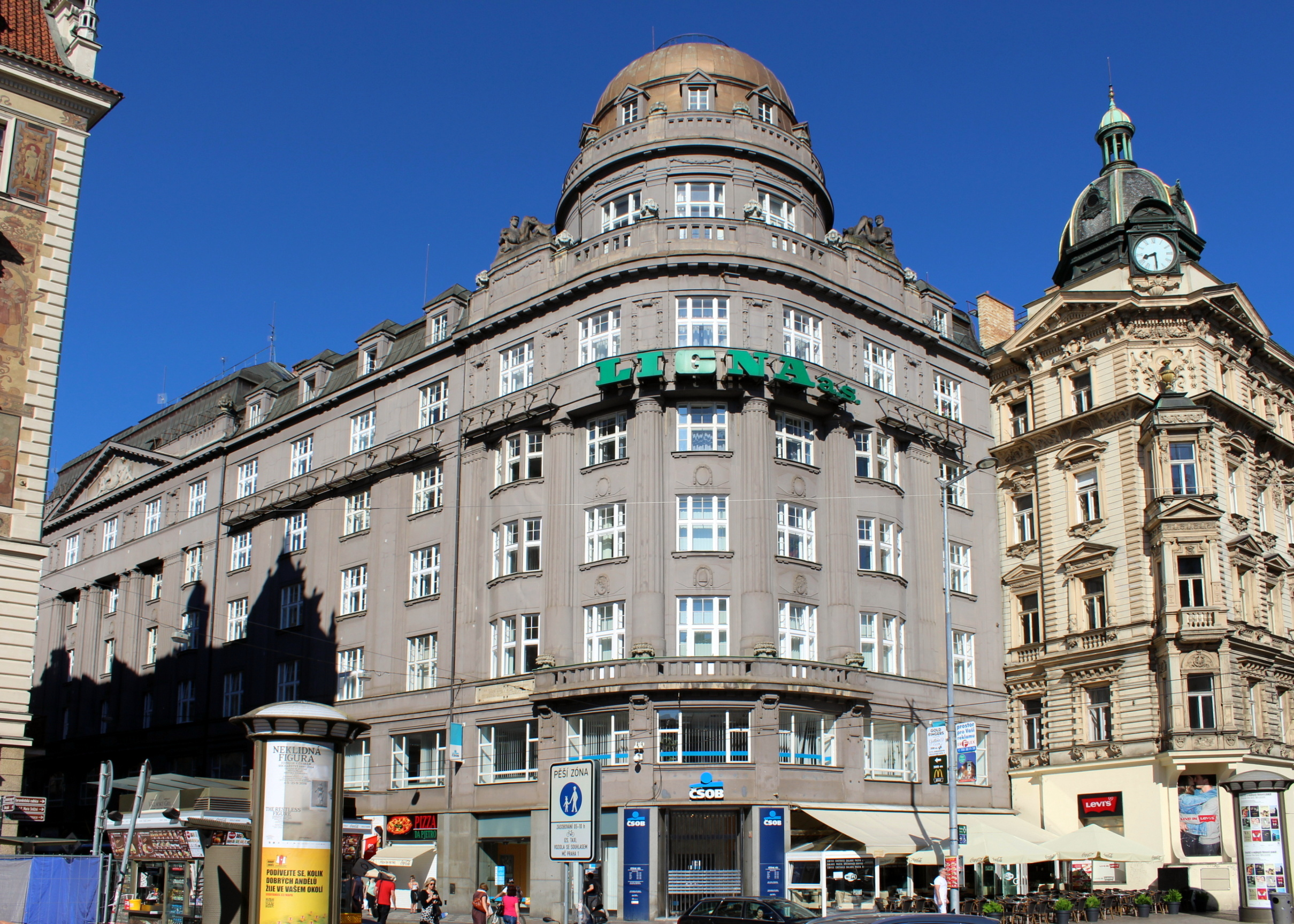
Former head office of Czech Bank in Prague, taken over by ZIBA in 1939

On 12 March 1938, Nazi Germany annexed Austria. The new German authorities in Vienna merged ZIBA's Austrian business into the Dresdner Bank–owned Mercurbank, together with the Austrian operations of the Paris-headquartered Zentral-Europäische Länderbank. On 29 September 1938, as a result of the Munich Agreement in which Czechoslovakia handed over the Sudetenland, Dresdner Bank further took over ZIBA's branches in Liberec, Ústí nad Labem, Karlovy Vary and Teplice. On 1 January 1939 following the First Vienna Award, ZIBA's branch in Košice was taken over by the Hungarian Commercial Bank of Pest At the same time, ZIBA took over the Petschek family business.

During Nazi occupation from 1939 and World War II, ZIBA was the only Czech bank that escaped direct annexation by German interests. Even so, it was forced to accept German control and to contribute heavily to financing the Nazis' war expenditures. It purchased almost a billion crowns' worth of Reich treasury bills, a sum about three times the ZIBA's capital stock. In June 1939, it fully took over the Czech Bank in Prague at the German authorities' request, and in 1943 similarly absorbed the Böhmische Industriebank.

== Postwar nationalisation and Communist era ==
In 1945, the new Czechoslovak government nationalized ZIBA, together with all other Czechoslovak banks. In 1948 ZIBA absorbed Prague Credit Bank, the former Anglo-Czechoslovak and Prague Credit Bank, and took over its New York office which it closed in 1949; at the same time, its Bratislava branch was closed and its activity transferred to Tatra Banka. ZIBA was eventually merged in 1950 into the State Bank of Czechoslovakia, which was headquartered in its former head office.

A London Office of Živnostenská banka existed at No.48 Bishopsgate, managed by Bruno Pollack and his deputy Leonard Dunstan. The bank continued to exist on that site into the 1950s when it moved to another part of the City.

Between 1950 and 1956, ZIBA continued to exist as a legal entity, like its Slovak counterpart Slovenská Tatra Banka (STB), in order to preserve its capacity to claim foreign assets on which the Czechoslovak authorities kept a claim. On 1 August 1956 and unlike with STB, the government restored it as an operating entity, and made it the primary Czechoslovak bank for Comecon import and export business, in which its London branch played a significant role. ZIBA was the repository for all foreign currency accounts maintained by expatriates, foreign firms operating in Czechoslovakia, and state agencies facilitating "invisible" trade such as tourism. In 1988, ZIBA resumed corporate business.

== Post-communist transition and merger into UniCredit ==
ZIBA logo under UniCredit ownership in the 2000s

In 1992, ZIBA became the first bank in central and eastern Europe to be privatized. Germany's BHF Bank took up 40% of the shares, the International Finance Corporation (IFC) acquired 12%, and the remaining 48% went to private individuals and Czech investment funds. Six years later, Bankgesellschaft Berlin became the largest shareholder in ZIBA after taking over BHF's now 47% equity stake. Other significant shareholders were the IFC and Crédit Commercial de France. In 2000, Bankgesellschaft Berlin increased its stake in ZIBA to 85.16%. At the time, the bank had branches in Prague, Brno, České Budějovice, Karlovy Vary, Liberec, Ostrava, Pardubice, and Zlín. It also had a representative office in Bratislava to handle operations in Slovakia.

In 2002, UniCredit acquired Bankgesellschaft Berlin's stake. In 2006 it merged ZIBA with HVB Bank Czech Republic, delisted it from the Prague Stock Exchange, and renamed the merged entity as UniCredit Bank Czech Republic.

== Buildings ==
In the late 19th century, ZIBA erected a new head office on the prestigious Na příkopě thoroughfare of Prague, designed by Osvald Polívka and completed in 1900. In the 1930s, it tore it down and from 1935 to 1942 built a much expanded headquarters designed by architect František Roith, who reused the allegoric sculpture that had crowned Polívka's building. The complex was taken over by the State Bank of Czechoslovakia after it absorbed ZIBA in 1950, and has remained the central office of the Czech National Bank after 1992. It was comprehensively renovated in 1997-2000.

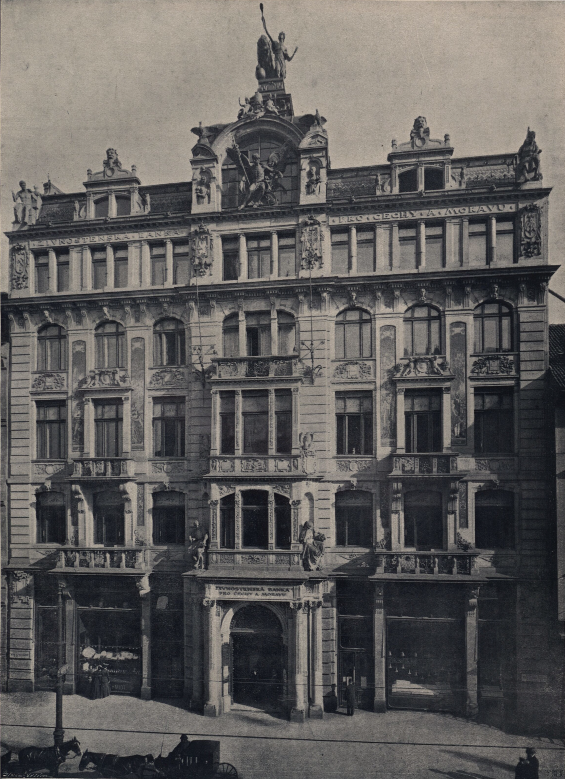
ZIBA head office on Na příkopě, Prague, in 1905

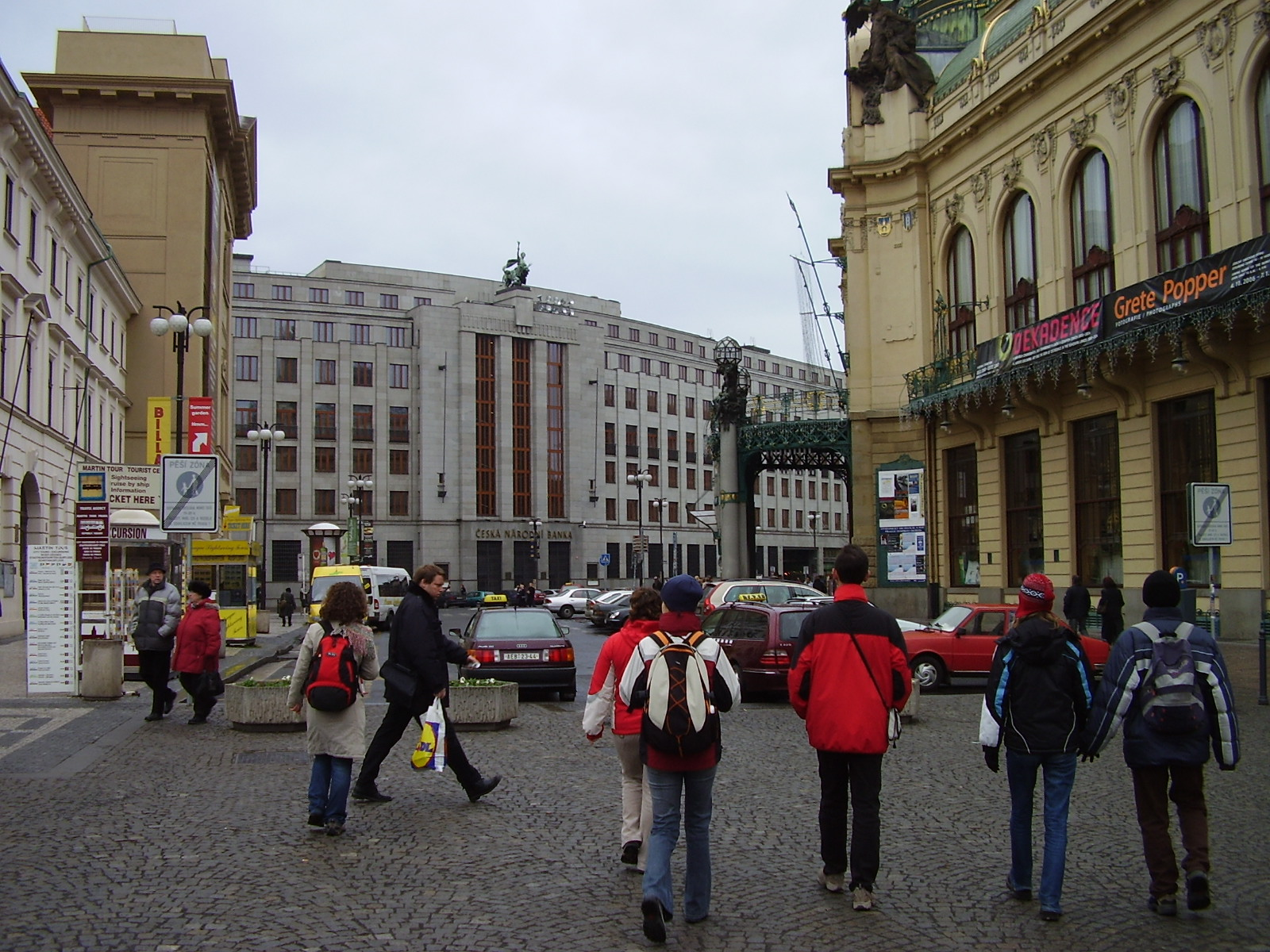
ZIBA building as reconstructed in the late 1930s, viewed from Náměstí Republiky

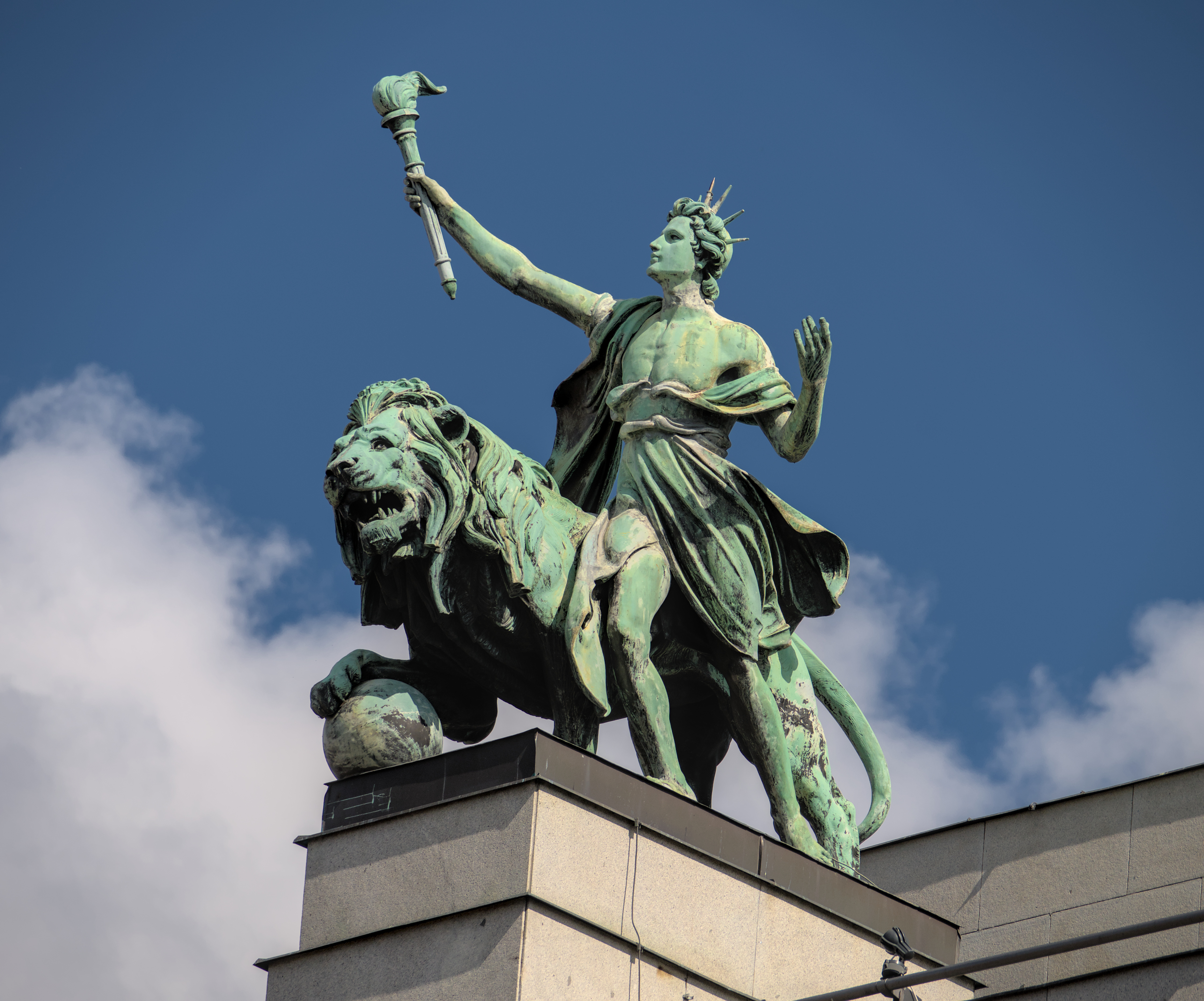
Statue of Lucifer by Antonín Popp, retained from the 1900 head office building

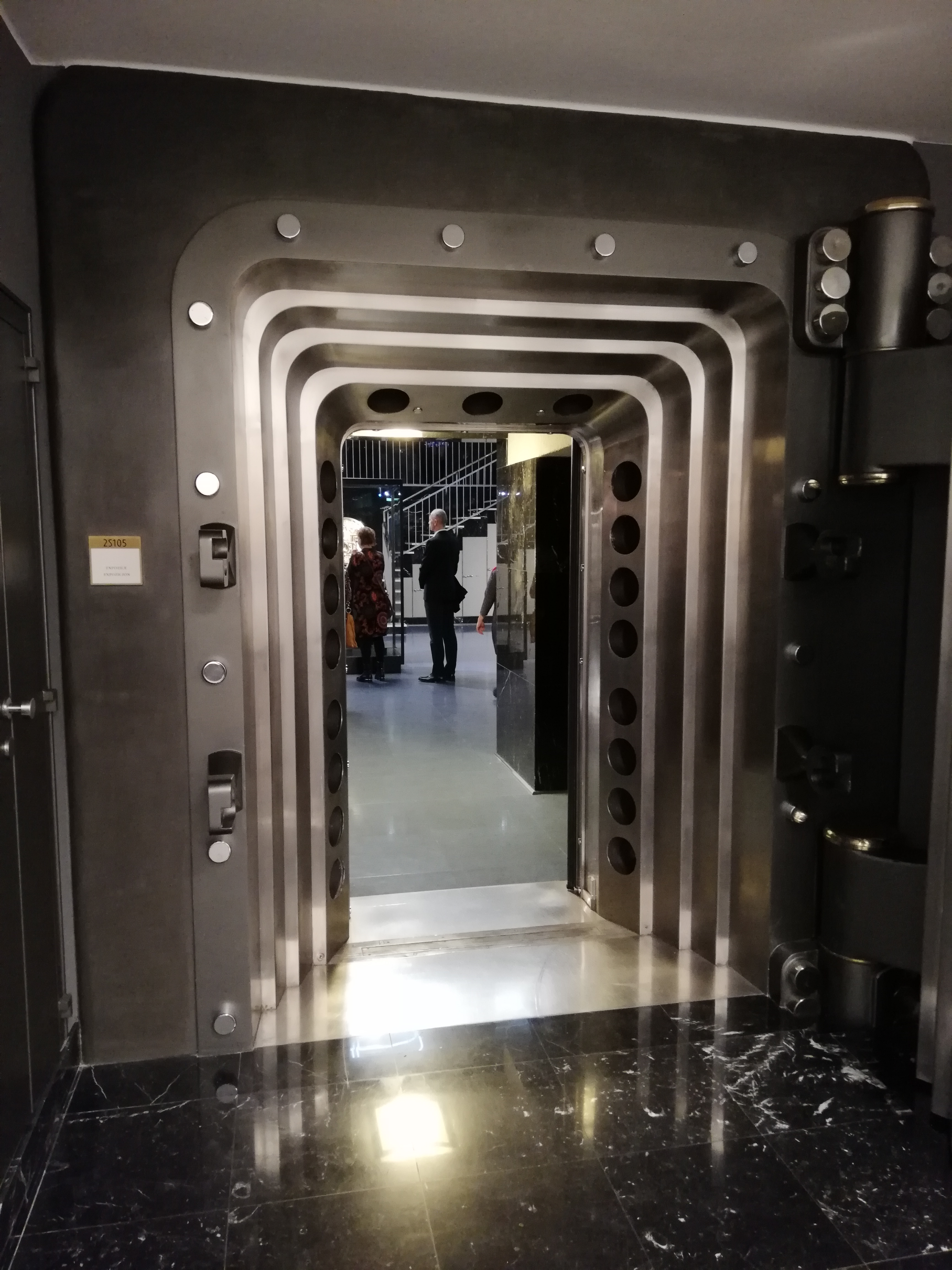
Safe in the ZIBA building's basement

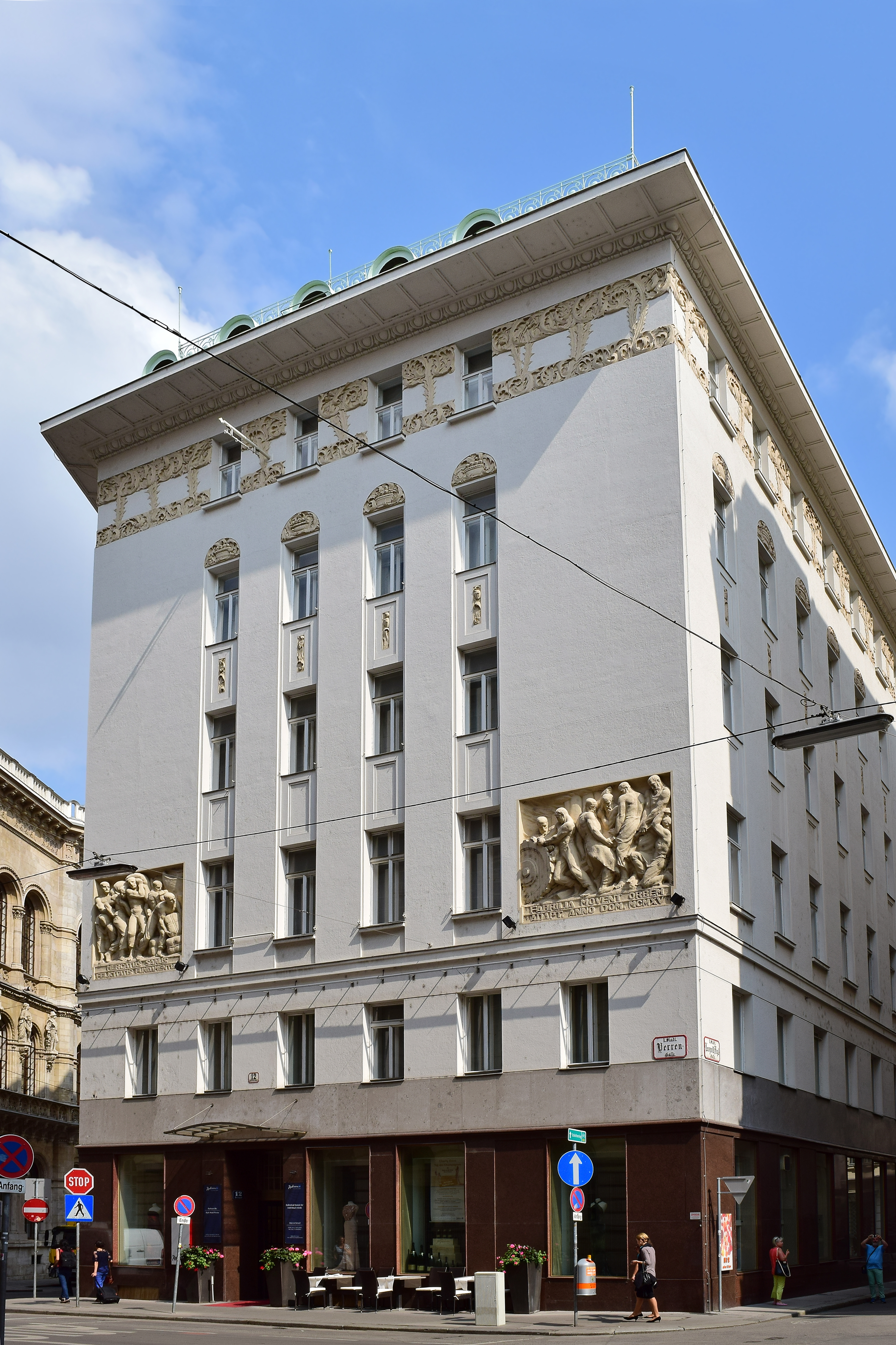
Former branch in Vienna, Herrengasse 12

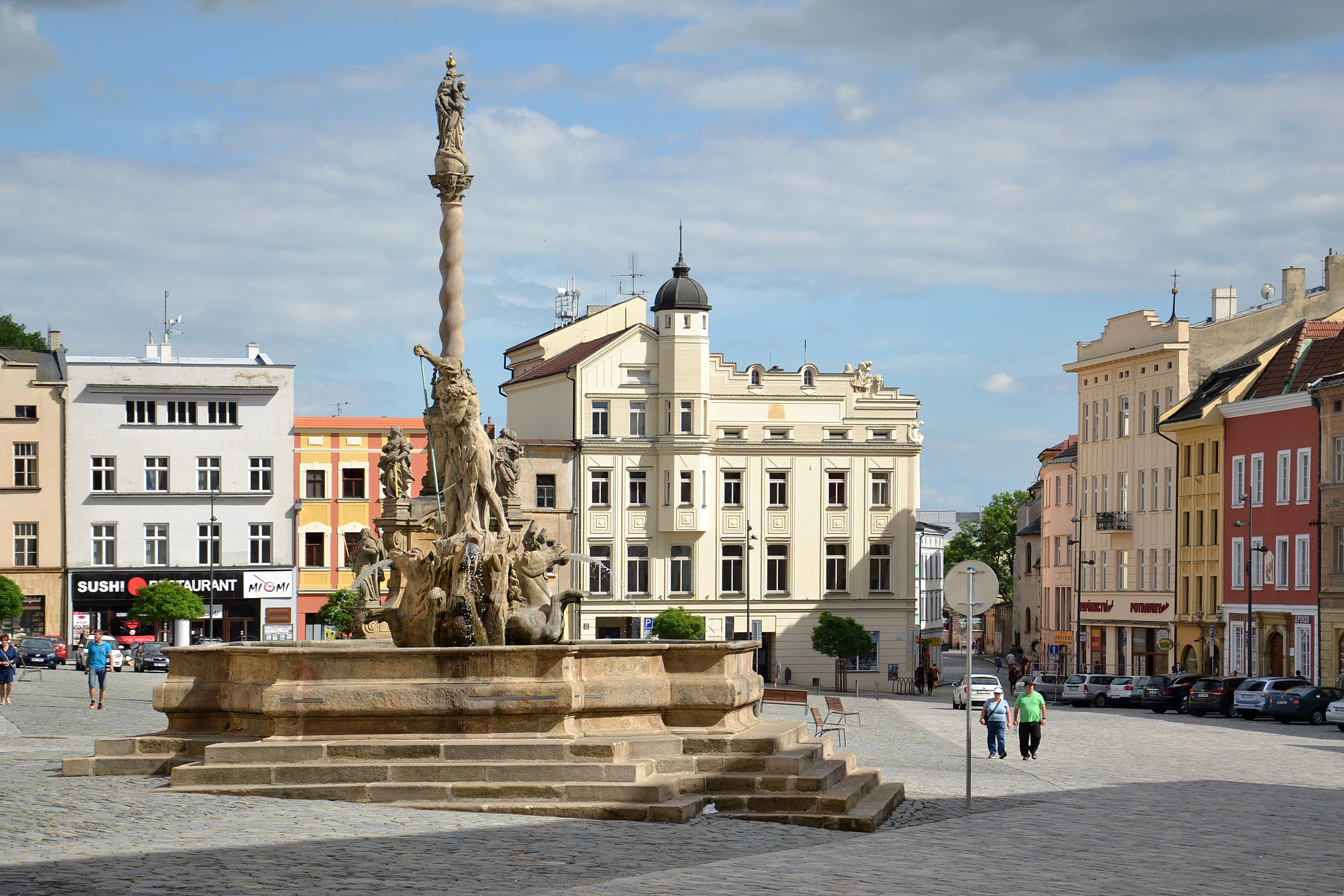
Former branch in Olomouc (center)

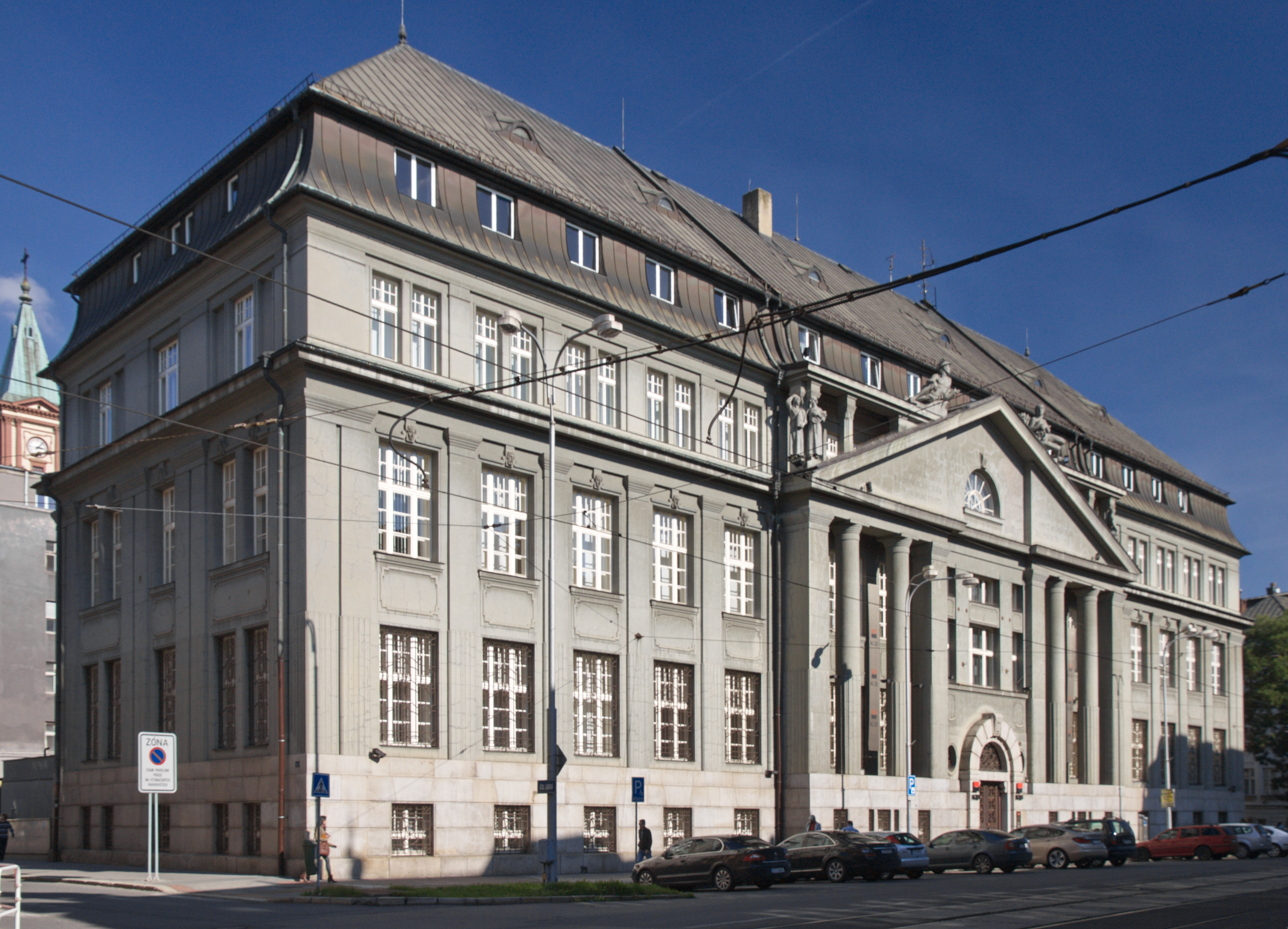
Former branch in Ostrava

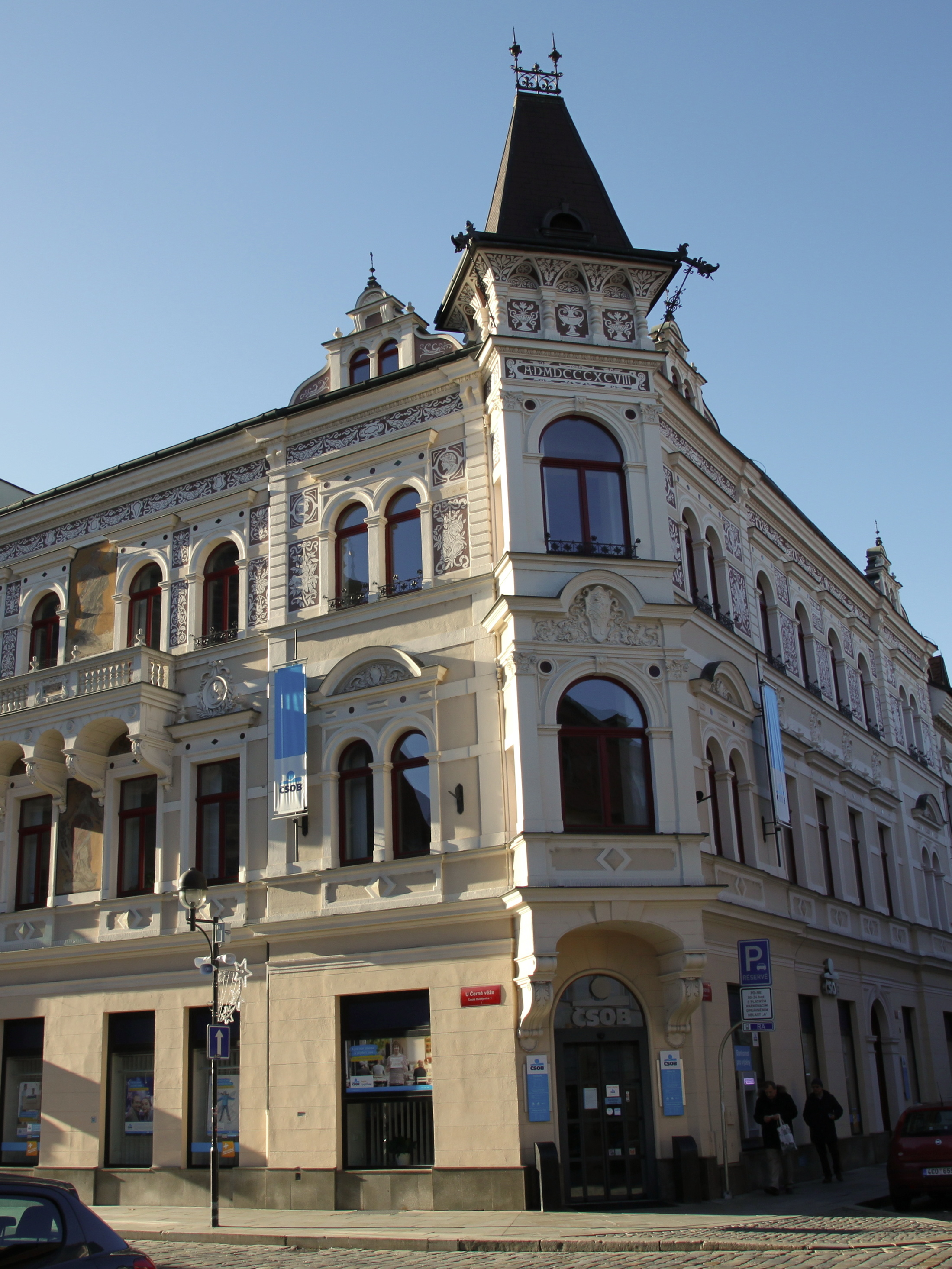
Former branch in České Budějovice

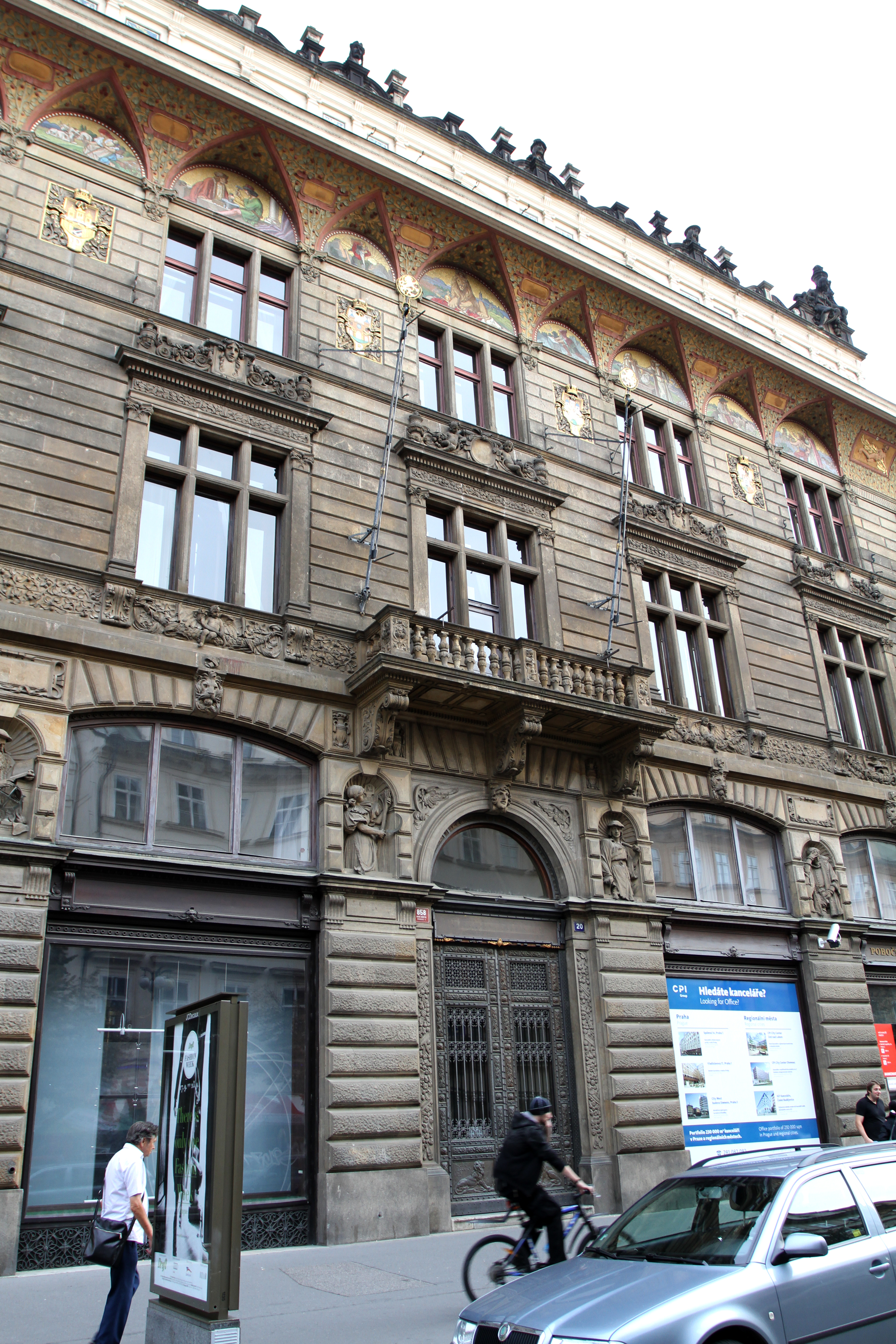
Former head office of Zemská Banka, serving as ZIBA's head office in the 1990s and 2000s

== See also ==
- Anglo-Czechoslovak Bank
- Zemská Banka
- List of banks in the Czech Republic
