= Böhmische Union Bank =

Former bank in Prague

Czech Union Bank
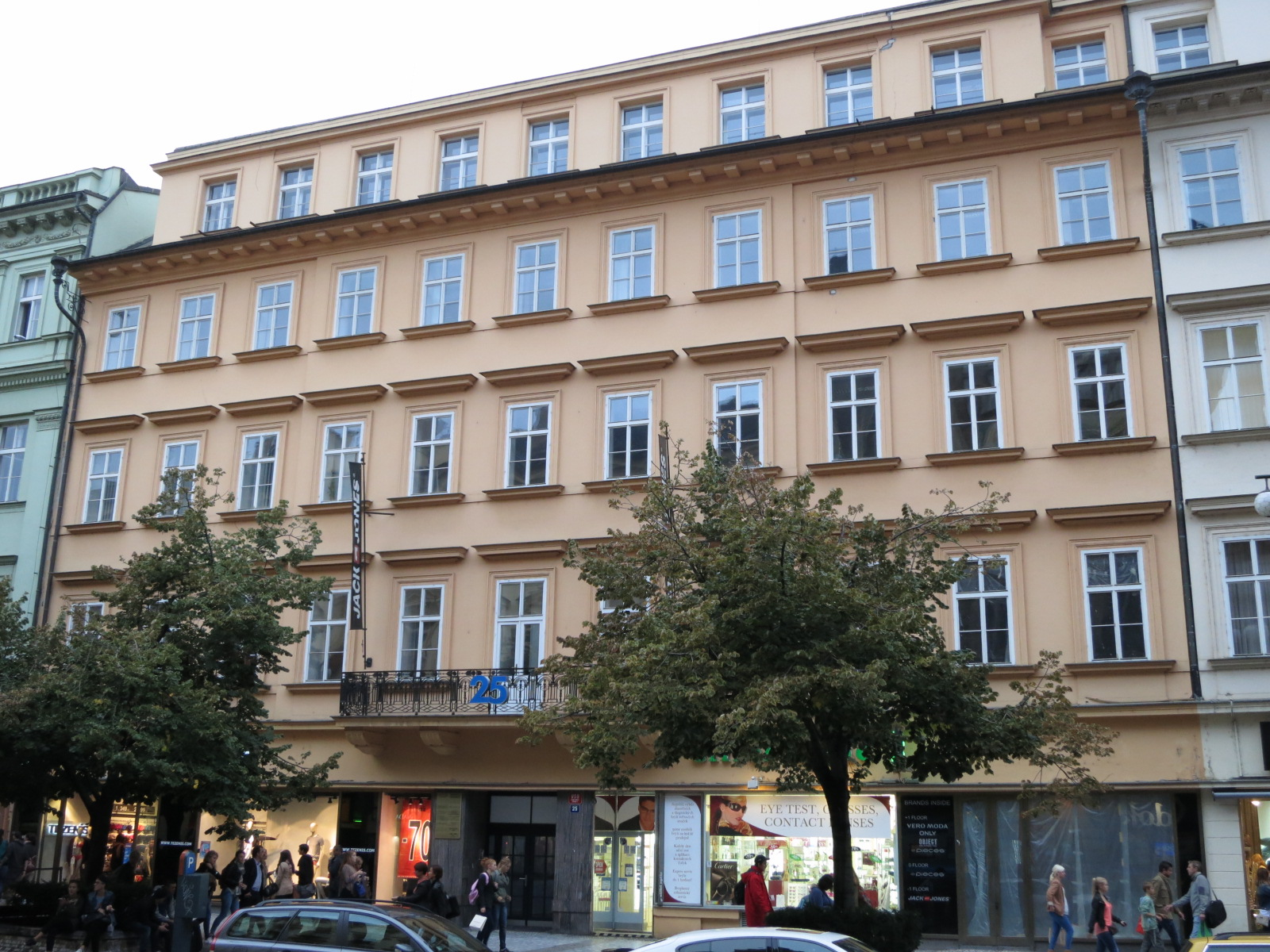
- Former headquarter building in Prague, Na příkopě 958-959
- Native name: Böhmische Union Bank
- Type: Private company
- Industry: Financial services
- Predecessor: Vienna Union-Bank
- Founded: 1872
- Defunct: 1945
- Fate: Confiscated
- Headquarters: Prague, Czech Republic
- Products: Investment banking, mortgages

The Böhmische Union-Bank (BUB, Czech: Česká banka Union) was a bank based in Prague, founded in 1872. One of the main commercial banks in interwar Czechoslovakia, it was associated with the country's German and Jewish communities. It was aryanized in March 1939, nationalized without compensation in October 1945, and subsequently liquidated.

The BUB had its head office from the start on the prestigious Na příkopě thoroughfare in central Prague, Nos.958-959, in a neoclassical building erected in the 1830s. In 1929, it demolished a building in the same block (No.574) to erect a more modern facility, but that project never came to fruition.

== History ==
=== In the Austrian-Hungarian Empire ===
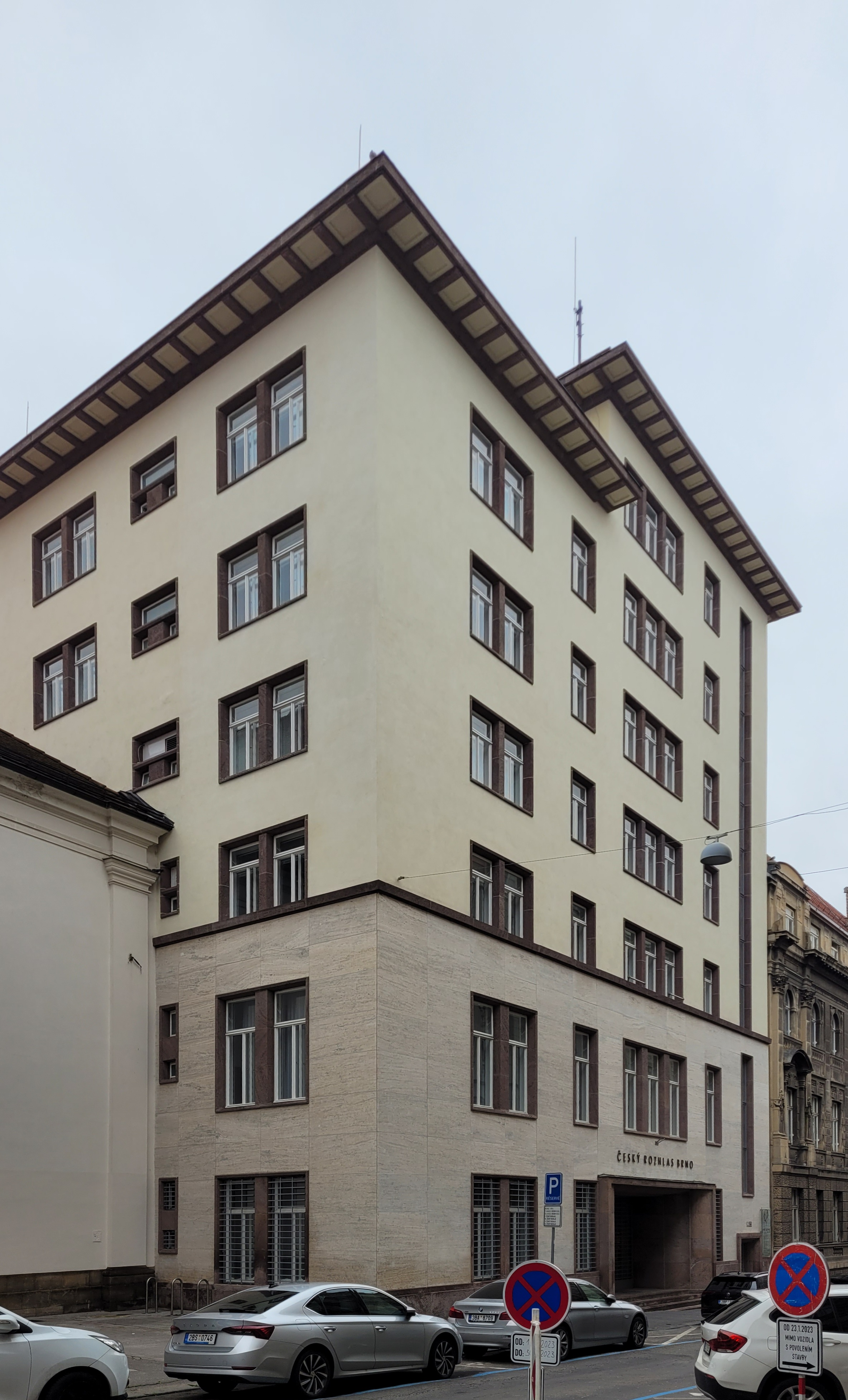
Former branch building in Brno, completed 1926 on a design by Ernst Wiesner, later used by Czech Radio

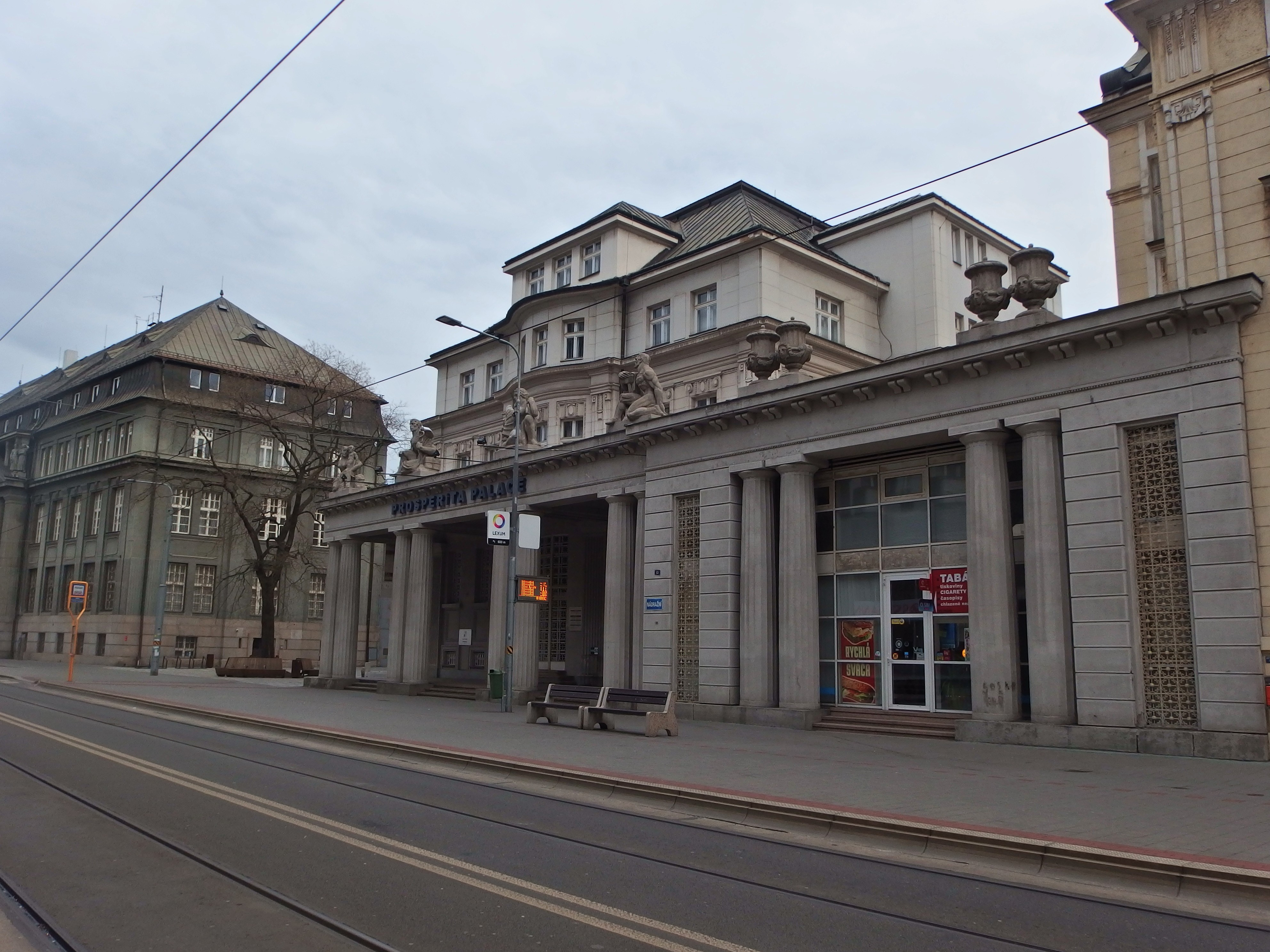
Villa Krause in Ostrava, BUB branch from 1920

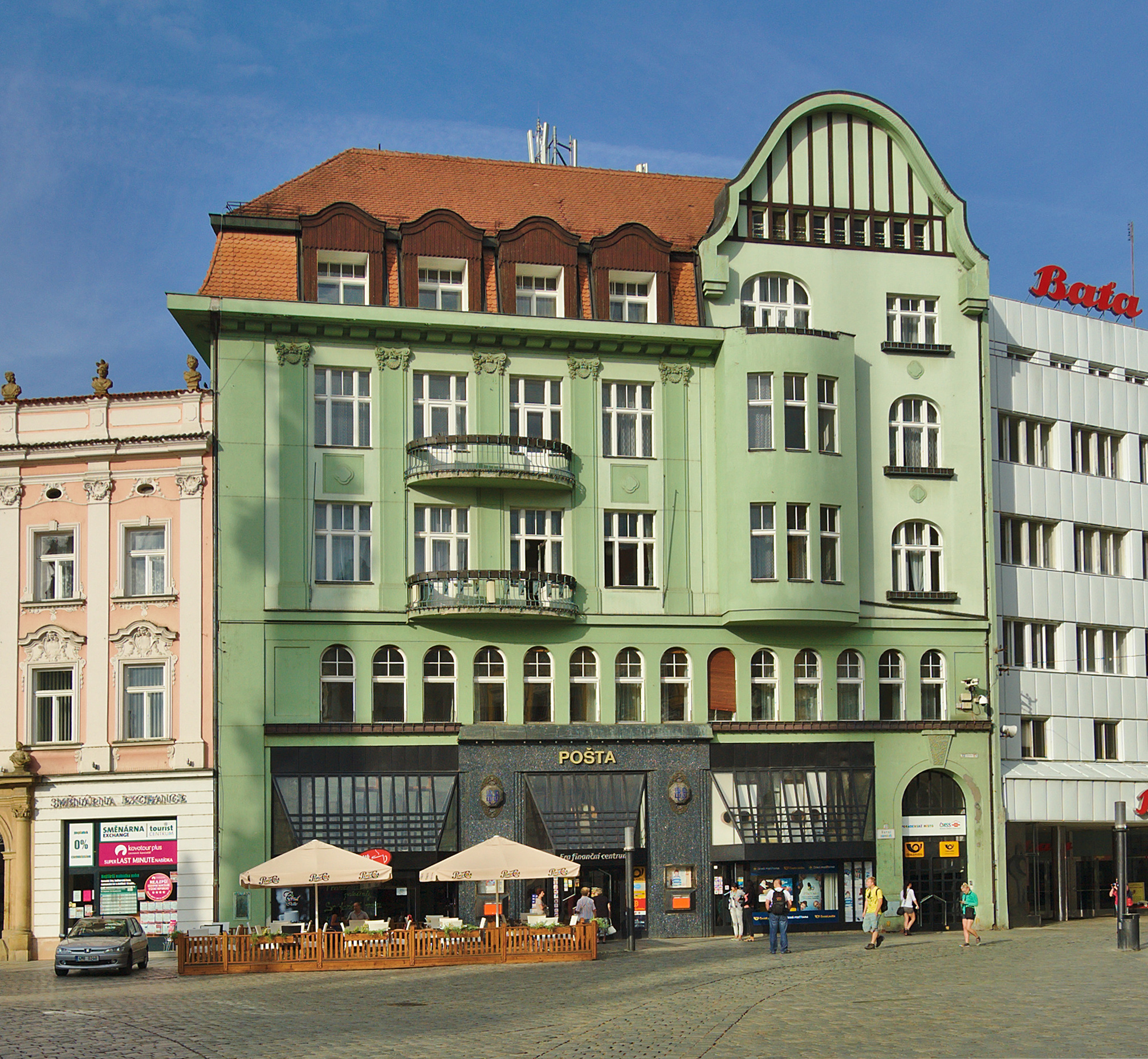
Former branch in Olomouc, later Post Office

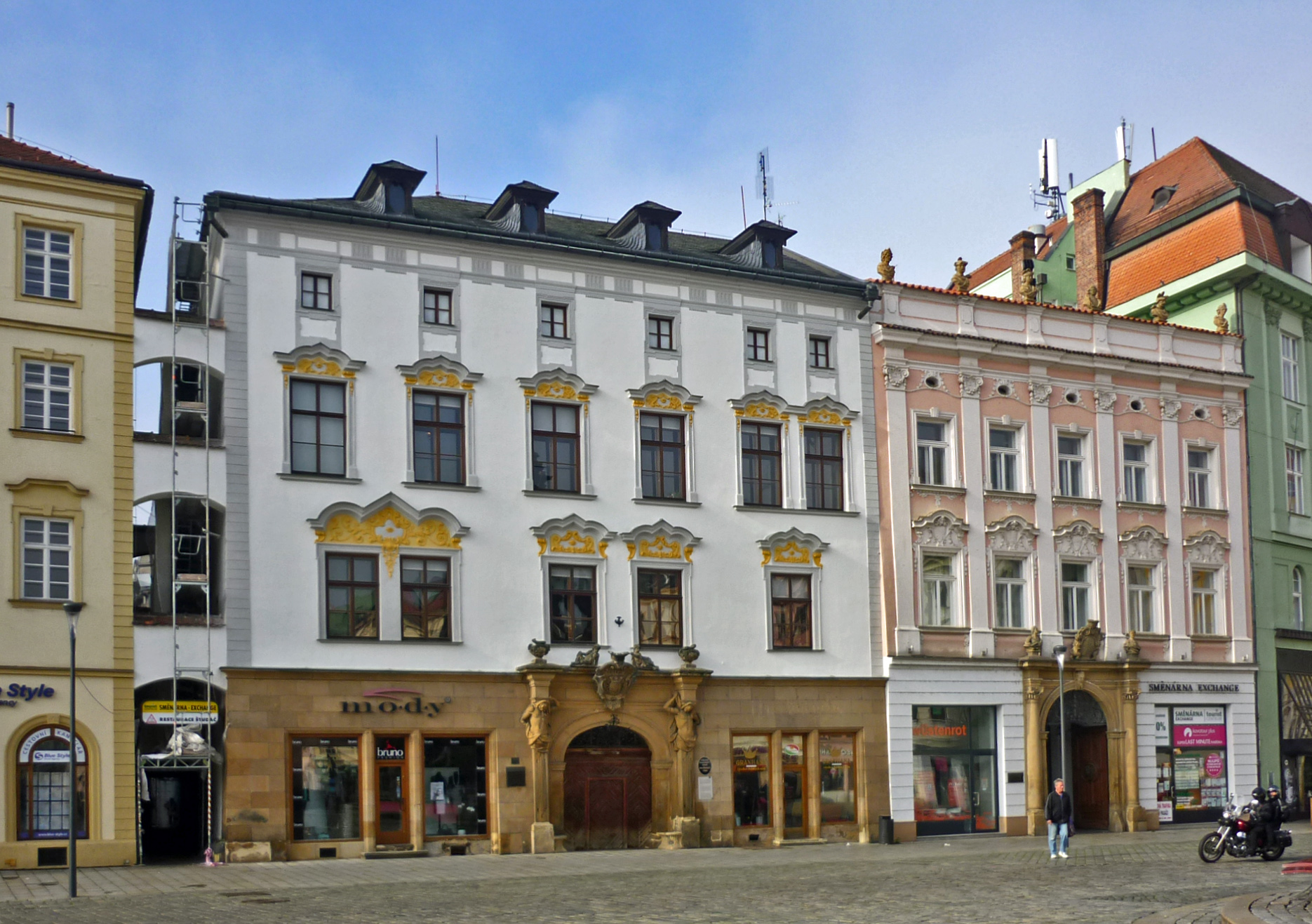
Earlier site of the Olomouc branch (until 1913) in the Petrasch Palace

The Böhmische Union-Bank was established by conversion of the former Prague branch of Vienna-based Union-Bank, itself formed recently by merger, into a stand-alone institution on 20 February 1872. The initial capital was 10 million Austro-Hungarian guldens. The BUB was soon involved into the short-lived Crédit foncier für das Königreich Böhmen, but that venture was wound up in 1874 following the panic of 1873. Also in 1874, BUB acquired two other Prague-based banks founded in 1872, the Böhmischer Sparverein and Böhmische Handels-, Gewerbe- und Realitätenbank. In 1888, it took over the operations of liquidated Reichenberger Bank in present-day Liberec.

By 1914, the BUB had 23 branches and branch offices in Cisleithania: 15 in the Czech lands with a concentration in the Sudetenland (present-day Bielsko, Brno, Broumov, Dvůr Králové nad Labem, FrýdekJablonec nad Nisou, Krnov, Liberec, Nový Jičín, Olomouc, Opava, Rumburk, Šumperk, Vrchlabí, and Žatec), and 8 further south in Celje, Dornbirn, Graz, Klagenfurt, Leoben, Linz, Salzburg, and Villach.

=== In Czechoslovakia ===
Following World War I and the collapse of Austria-Hungary, BUB had to give up its branches outside the newly formed territory of Czechoslovakia. Still, it was one of the largest financial institutions in the country, and the largest associated with the German community. In 1920, Banca Commerciale Italiana acquired a stake in BUB. That same year, BUB opened a new branch in Ostrava in the Kraus villa, and in 1928 it acquired the small Varnsdorf Bank in Varnsdorf. Like other Czechoslovak banks, it was severely affected by the European banking crisis of 1931. It subsequently absorbed the Allgemeiner Böhmischer Bank-Verein which had been formed in 1921 from the former operations of Wiener Bankverein on Czechoslovak territory.

In 1937, BUB had 34 branches, mainly in the German-speaking border areas and large industrial cities with a high concentration of German-speaking population; of these, only one was in Slovakia (in Bratislava). 23 of these were lost following the Munich Agreement in 1938, and taken over by Deutsche Bank.

=== World War II and aftermath ===
In March 1939, after the establishment of the Protectorate of Bohemia and Moravia, Deutsche Bank executive Walter Pohle led the aryanization process under oversight by the Gestapo. The Jewish members of the supervisory board were dismissed, and the other members of the board all resigned. Deutsche Bank took majority control of BUB, simultaneously as Böhmische Escompte-Bank went to Dresdner Bank, while Deutsche's de facto subsidiary Creditanstalt-Bankverein took over the BUB's Bratislava branch. BUB also established an aryanization office to foster expropriation and dismissal of Jews in its client companies.

Deutsche Bank planned a full absorption of BUB in 1942, but this plan was not executed. By 1943, Deutsche Bank owned 91 percent of BUB's equity capital, of which 33 percent indirectly through Creditanstalt-Bankverein.

After the end of the war, the Czechoslovak authorities decided in August 1945 to liquidate BUB given its German associations. The management was taken over by a national administrator, and the confiscation was formalized by Presidential Decree No.108/1945 of 24 October 1945. BUB remained legally in existence (under the name Česká Banka Union) as a national enterprise in liquidation until at least 1969.

== See also ==
- Živnostenská Banka
- Anglo-Czechoslovak and Prague Credit Bank
- List of banks in the Czech Republic
