= Böhmische Industriebank =

Former bank in Prague

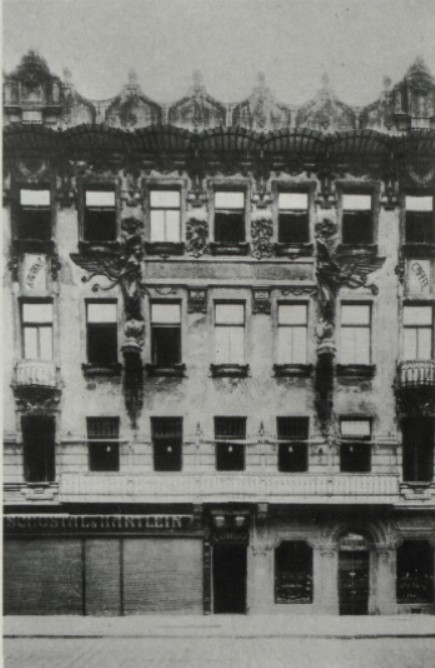
- Böhmische Industriebank head office in Prague, photographed before demolition in 1936
- Company type: Private company
- Industry: Financial services
- Founded: 1898
- Defunct: 1943
- Fate: Forcible merged
- Successor: Živnostenská Banka
- Headquarters: Prague, Czech Republic
- Products: Banking services

The Böhmische Industriebank (Czech: Česká průmyslová banka, lit. 'Czech Industrial Bank') was a Czech bank based in Prague, founded in 1898. By 1914, it was among the three largest banks in the Czech lands. The bank came to an end in 1943 when it was merged with Živnostenská Banka.

== Overview ==
The bank's creation in 1898 was supported by the Czech National Economic Society (Czech: Česká společnost národohospodářská), with the aim of providing better credit conditions for industrial development in the country. It took over several local banks in the early 1920s. In 1943, it was forcibly merged into Živnostenská Banka under orders from the German occupation authorities.

== See also ==
- Böhmische Union Bank
- Böhmische Escompte-Bank
- Anglo-Czechoslovak and Prague Credit Bank
- List of banks in the Czech Republic
