= Zemská Banka =

Former bank in Prague

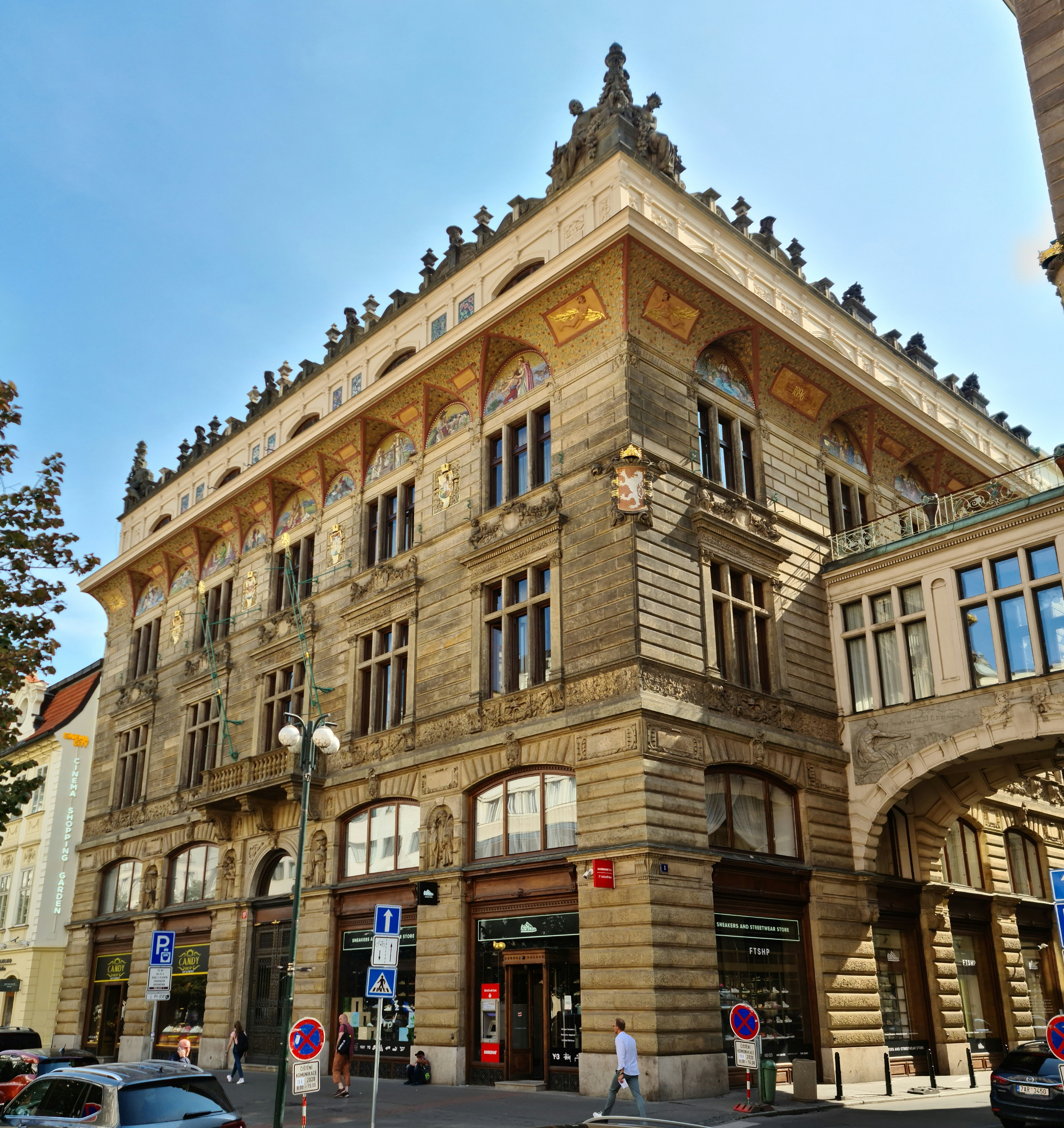
The ornate former head office of Zemská Banka on Na příkopě, Prague

Zemská Banka (German: Landesbank) was a significant state-sponsored financial institution in Prague during the late 19th and early 20th centuries. It was founded in 1890 as the Landesbank des Königreiches Böhmen (Czech: Zemská banka království Českého, French: Banque du Royaume de Bohëme, English: Royal Bank of Bohemia). Following the independence of Czechoslovakia, from 1920 it was known simply as Zemská Banka, or to differentiate it from other banks of the same name, Zemská banka v Praze ("in Prague") or Zemská banka pro Čechy ("for Bohemia"). During Nazi occupation it was known as the Landesbank für Böhmen, while its operation in the Slovak Republic were transferred to an institution newly established for that purpose, the Slovenská hypotečná a komunálna banka (SHKB, lit. 'Slovak Mortgage and Municipal Bank'). In 1948, both Zemská Banka and SHKB merged into the state-owned Investiční Banka.

== History ==
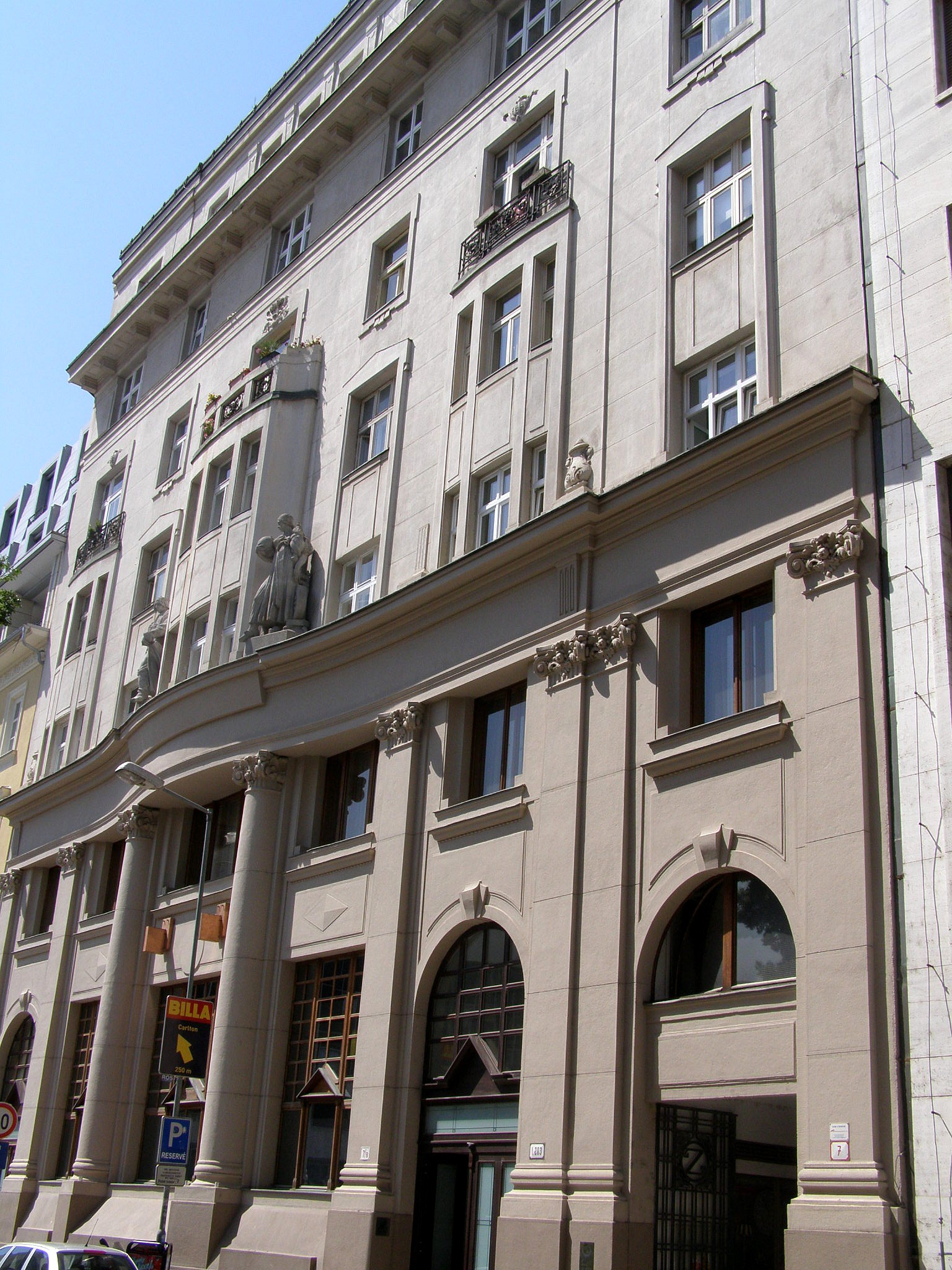
Former Bratislava branch building, Gorkého 7

Zemská Banka was established in 1890 by the authorities of Bohemia under the Habsburg Monarchy. It complemented the Hypothekenbank des Königreichs Böhmen, established in Prague in 1865 with a government guarantee, considered the original mortgage bank in the Habsburg monarchy.

In the period of turmoil immediately after World War I, Zemská Banka had more assets than any of the joint-stock banks in Czechoslovakia. It opened a branch in Bratislava in 1924 and another one in Uzhhorod in 1937.

As a consequence of the First Vienna Award in November 1938, the assets and operations of the Uzhgorod branch were transferred to Bratislava and Prague. Following the establishment of the separate Slovak Republic, on 1 July 1939 all transactions and tangible assets of the Bratislava branch were transferred to a purpose-created entity, the SHKB established by law of 24 April 1939. The branch itself ceased business in October 1939, and its residual operations were managed from Prague. Long-term commitments in the territory occupied by Hungary remained managed from Prague, and those in Slovakia were transferred to SHKB in 1940.

In the wake of the 1948 Czechoslovak coup d'état, a legislative act of 20 July 1948 mandated the transfer of all operations of Zemská Banka, SHKB, and several other institutions to the newly formed Investiční Banka, most of which was merged into State Bank of Czechoslovakia in 1958.

== Head office in Prague ==
The former head office of Zemská Banka was built on the Na příkopě thoroughfare in 1894–1896, on the location of a former baroque palace that served as Bohemian Museum (Czech: Zemské muzeum) between 1847 and 1890 and was demolished in 1893. It is a highlight of Art Nouveau in Prague, in which many of the era's recognized artists participated. For its decoration, architect Osvald Polívka involved sculptors Celda Klouček, Bohuslav Schnirch, František Hergesel, Stanislav Sucharda, and Alois Folkmann; painters Mikoláš Aleš, Anna Boudová Suchardová, František Urban, Max Švabinský, Karel Vítězslav Mašek, Karel Klusáček, and Emil Holárek; and decorative artists Rudolf Říhovský and Vratislav Nechleba. The building was later altered in 1908–1909 on designs by Polívka, then again in 1927–1928, 1948, and 1988–1989.

The Zemská Banka building had become property of Živnostenská Banka (ZIBA) when the latter was privatized in the 1990s, and thus is also known as the Živnostenská Banka building. UniCredit purchased ZIBA in 2002 and sold the Zemská Banka building in 2011 to CPI Property Group. In 2015, it was announced that Chinese conglomerate CEFC China Energy would purchase the property from CPI to serve as its European headquarters. In late 2018, CNN reported that China's state-owned conglomerate CITIC Group had taken over CEFC's former assets in the Czech Republic.

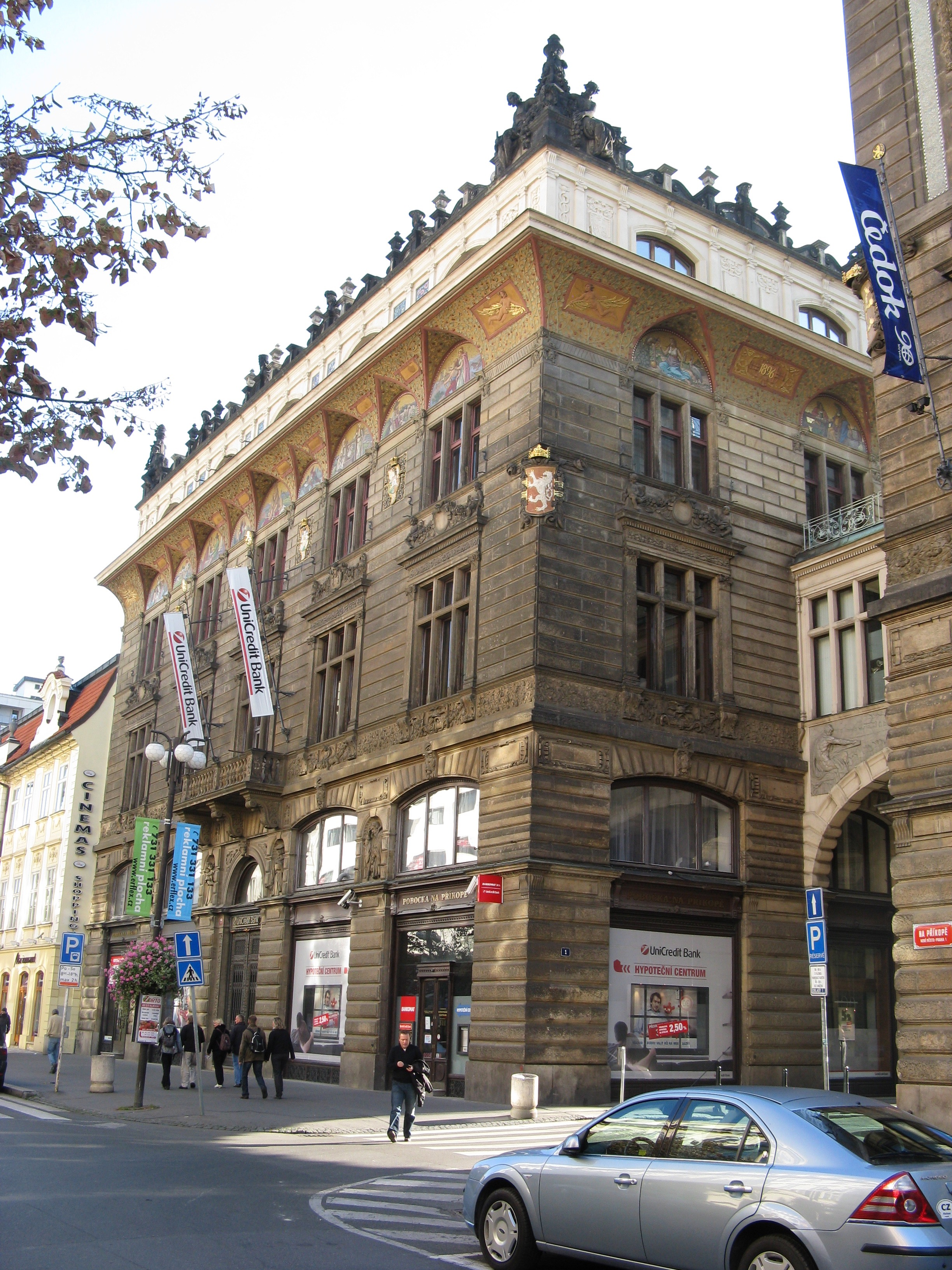
Prague head office, general view

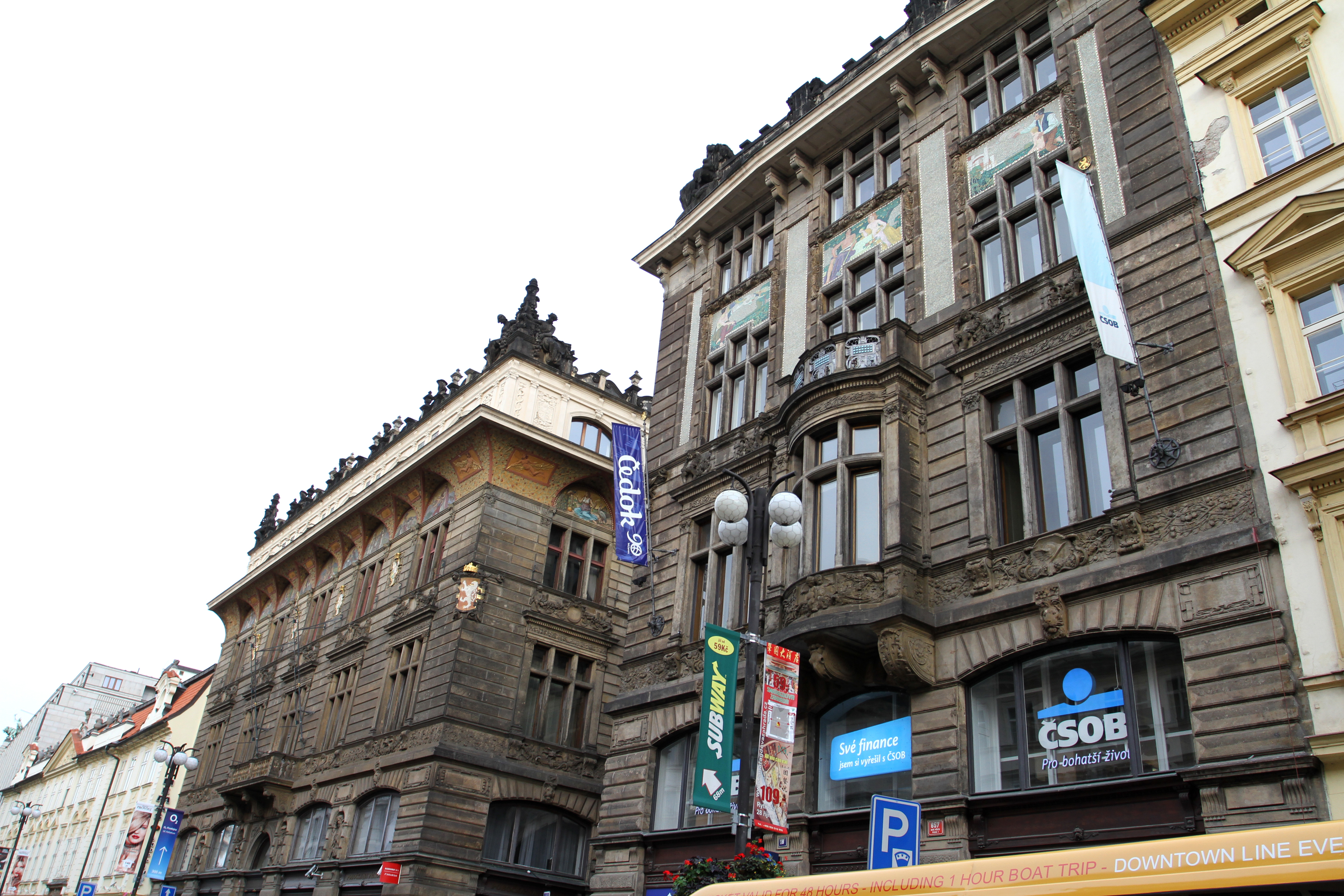
Main building (left) and annex (right) on Na příkopě

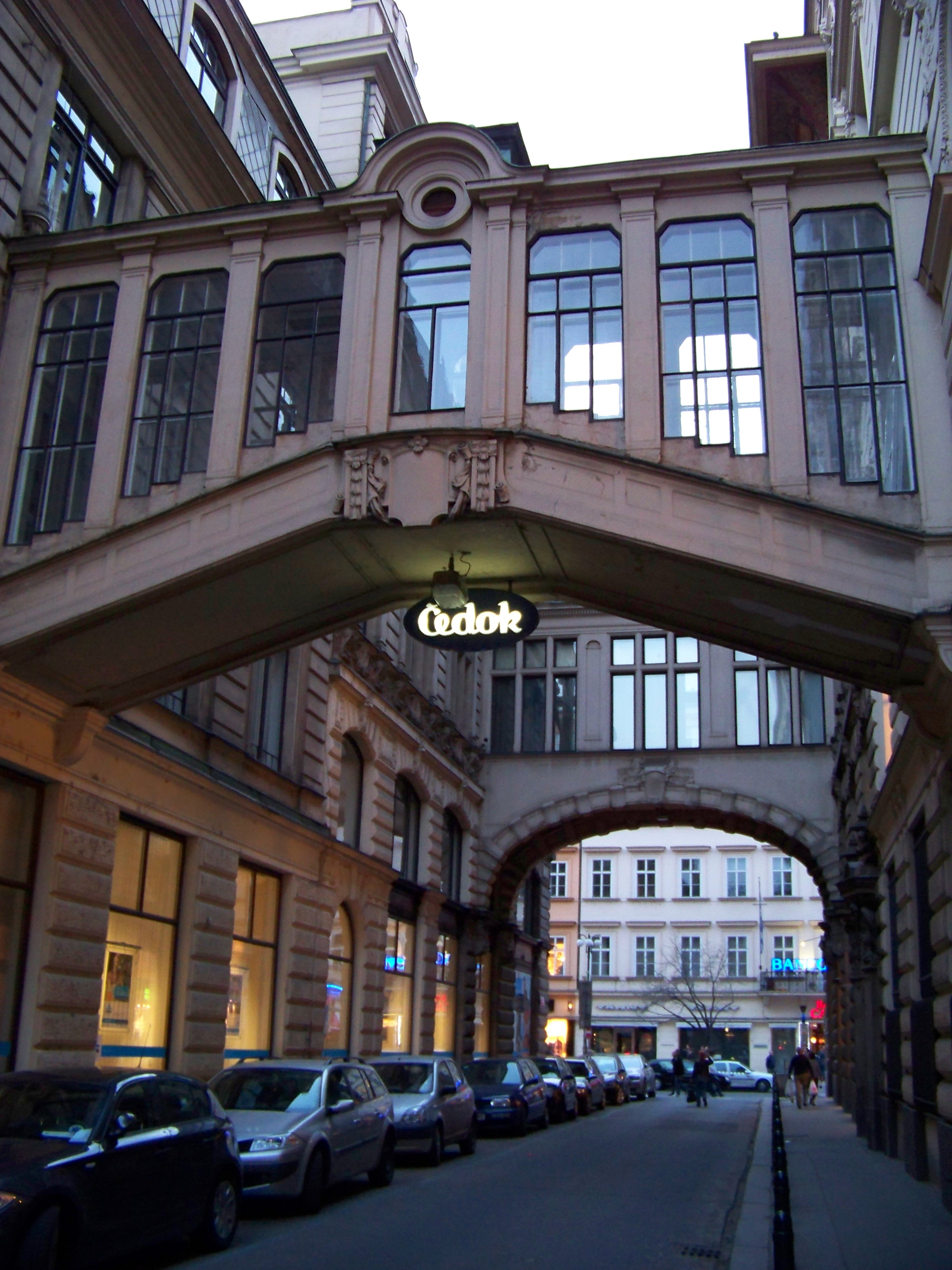
Bridges linking the two buildings, erected in 1908–1909

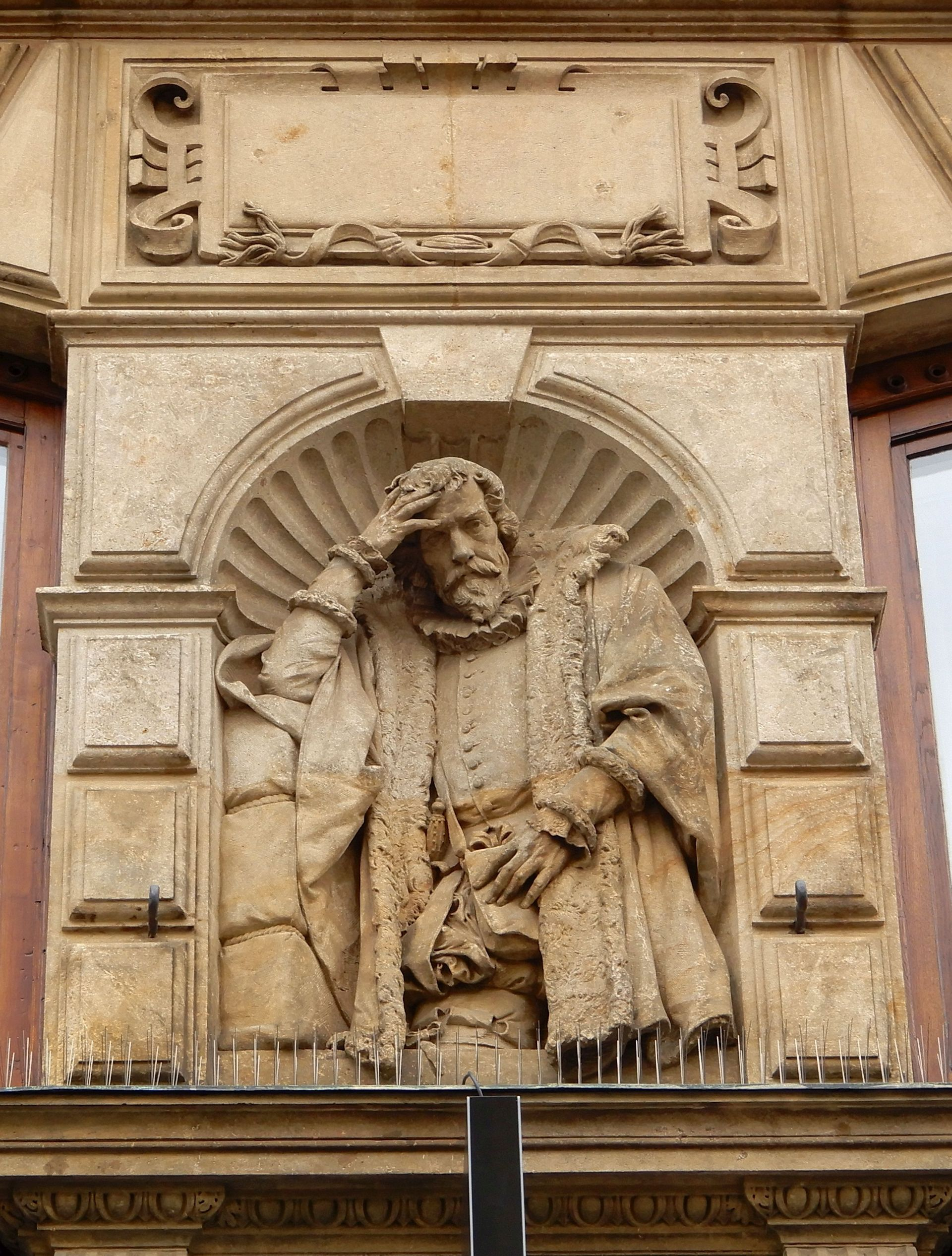
Commerce by Stanislav Sucharda

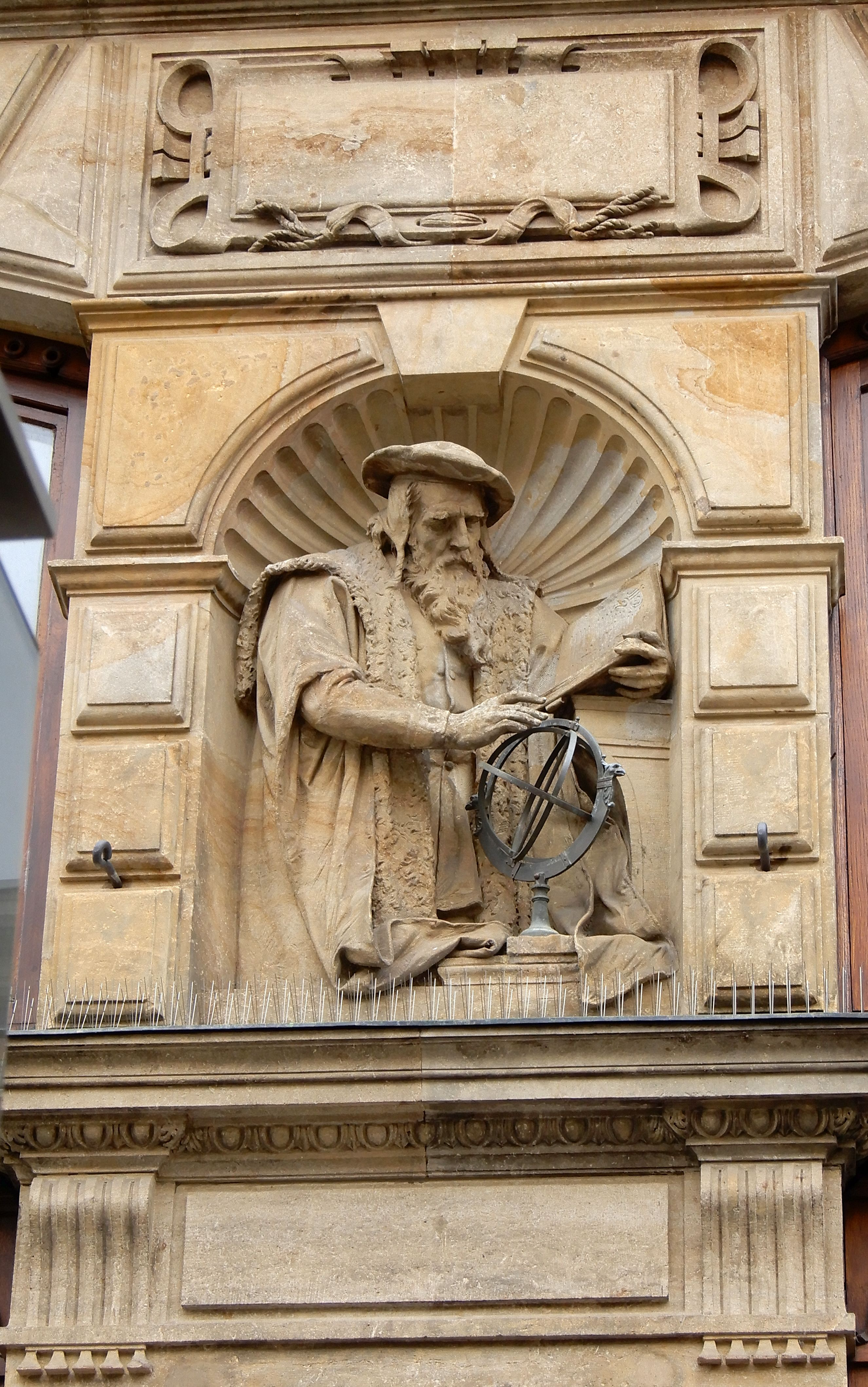
Science by Stanislav Sucharda

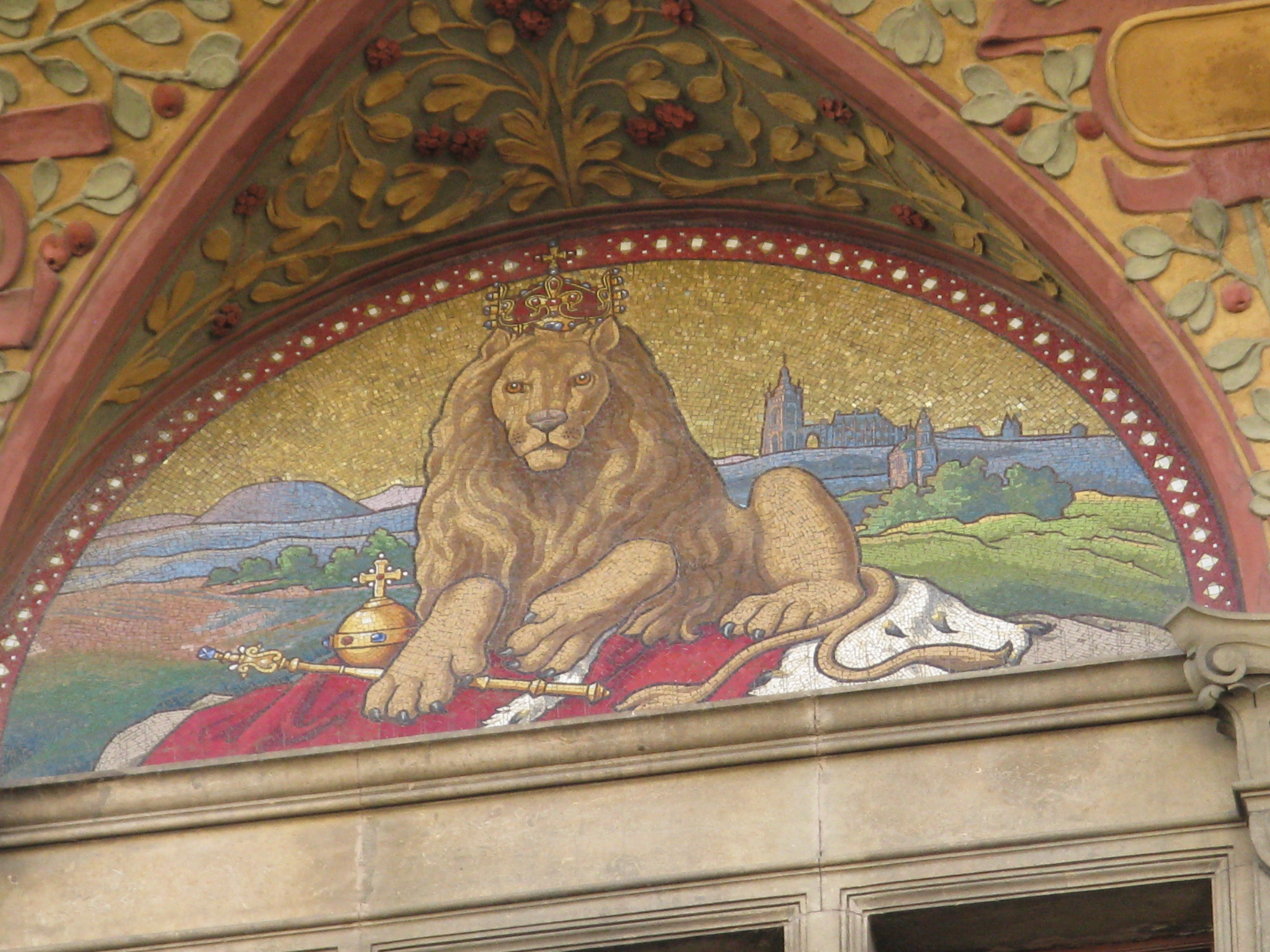
Mosaic allegory of the Kingdom of Bohemia by František Urban

== See also ==
- Živnostenská Banka
- Bank Krajowy
- Landesbank
- List of banks in the Czech Republic
