= Osvald Polívka =

Czech architect (1859–1931)

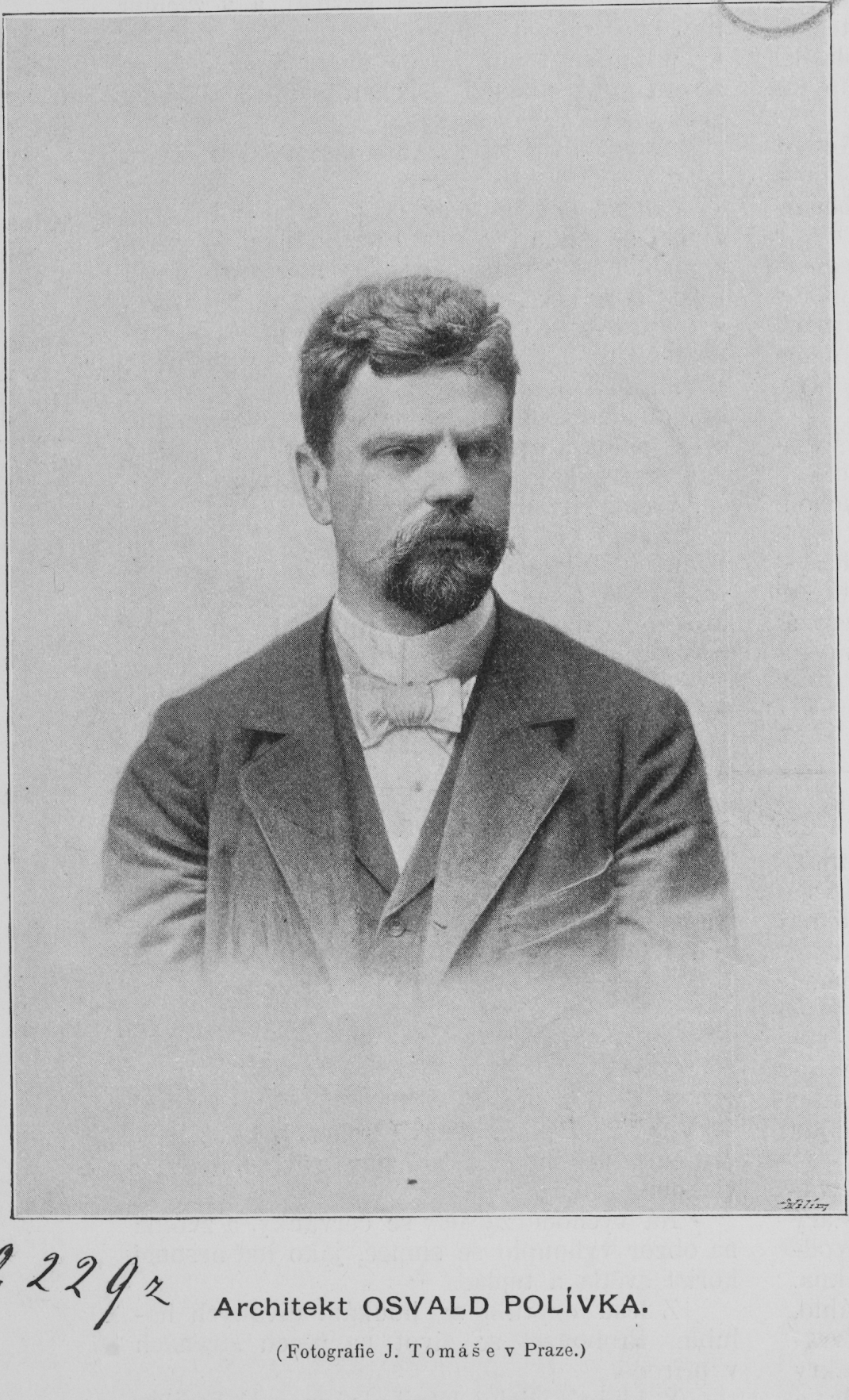
Polívka in 1896

Osvald Polívka (24 May 1859 in Enns – 30 April 1931 in Prague) was Czech architect associated with the Art Nouveau period in Prague. Polívka designed many of Prague's significant landmarks of the era, plus other work in Brno and elsewhere.

After graduating from Czech Polytechnic in Prague, his first important commission was a collaboration with Antonín Wiehl, the 1894 Prague City Savings Bank. Polívka's style evolved through his active years but he remained devoted to collaborating with artists for aesthetic effect. For the ornate landmark Municipal House he coordinated the work of many significant Czech muralists and sculptors of the time, including his friend Alfons Mucha.

He is buried at Olšany Cemetery in Prague.

== Major architectural projects ==
- Prague City Savings Bank, Old Town Square, together with Antonín Wiehl, 1894, with distinctive architectural sculptural groups by Bohuslav Schnirch
- Zemská Banka head office, Na příkopě, 1895-1896
- Assicurazioni Generali offices, now the Viola Building, with Friedrich Ohmann, #7 Wenceslas Square, 1897
- U Nováků department store, 1902–1903
- co-architect with Municipal House (Obecní dům), with Antonín Balšánek, 1904–1912
- Topič House, c. 1905
- the New Town Hall of Prague, 1908–1911, with architectural sculpture by Stanislav Sucharda, Josef Mařatka and Ladislav Šaloun
- Gallery of Modern Art in Hradec Králové, 1912, with allegorical sculpture by Šaloun flanking the entrance
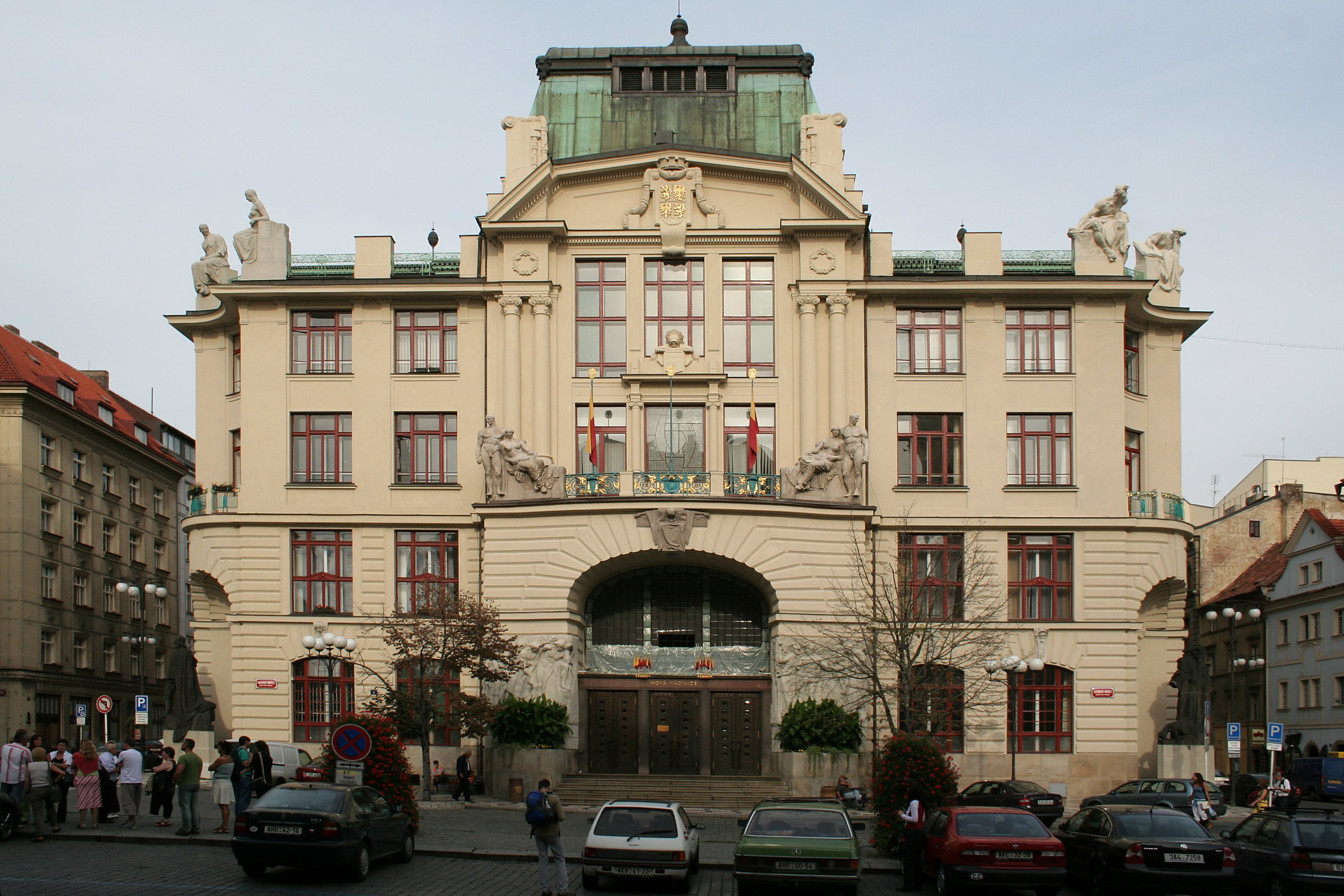
New Town Hall, Prague

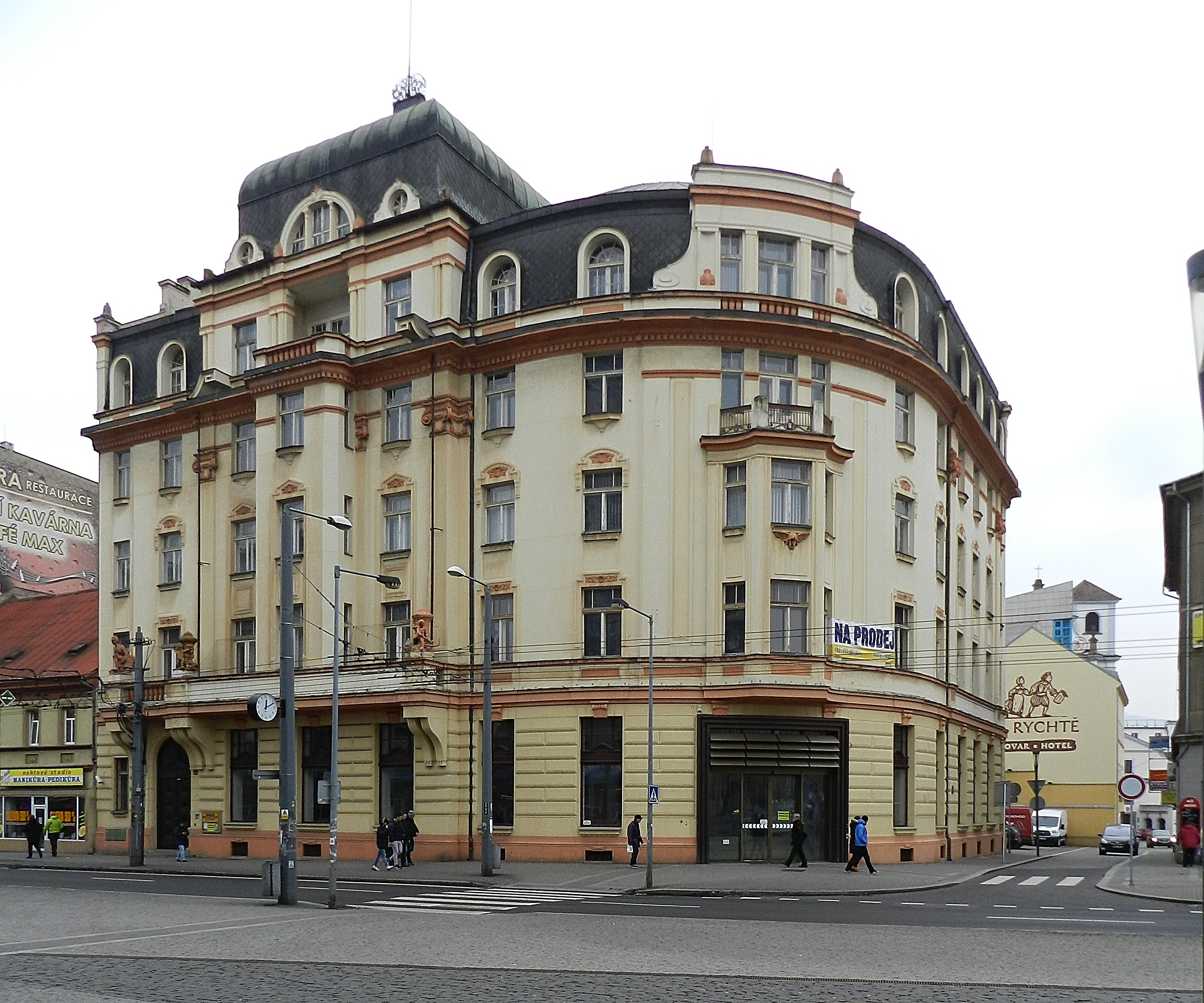
Czech Trading Company, Prague

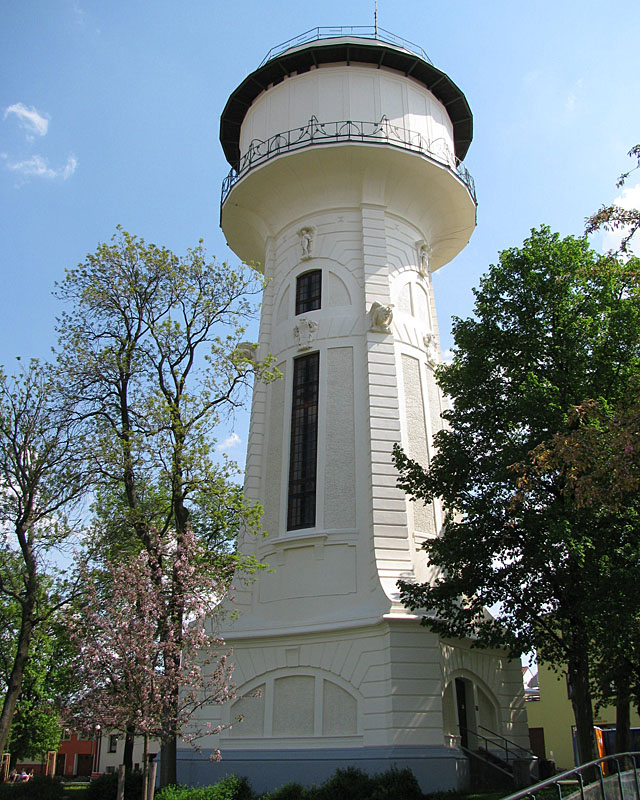
Teuna Waterworks

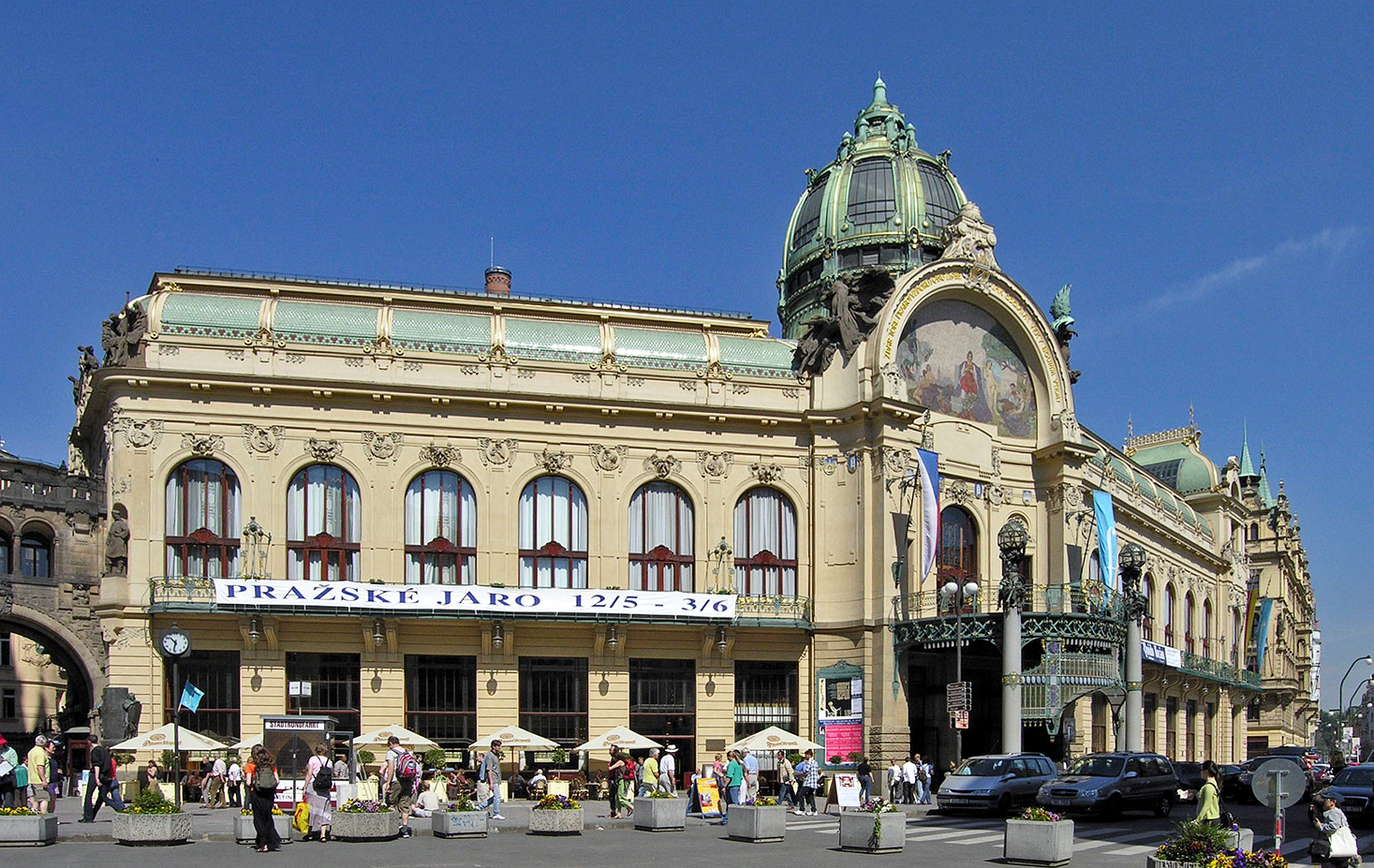
Municipal House, Prague
