= Antonín Popp =

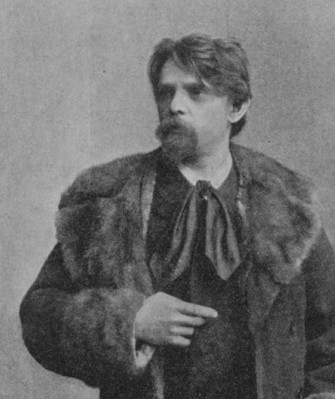
Antonín Popp (date unknown)

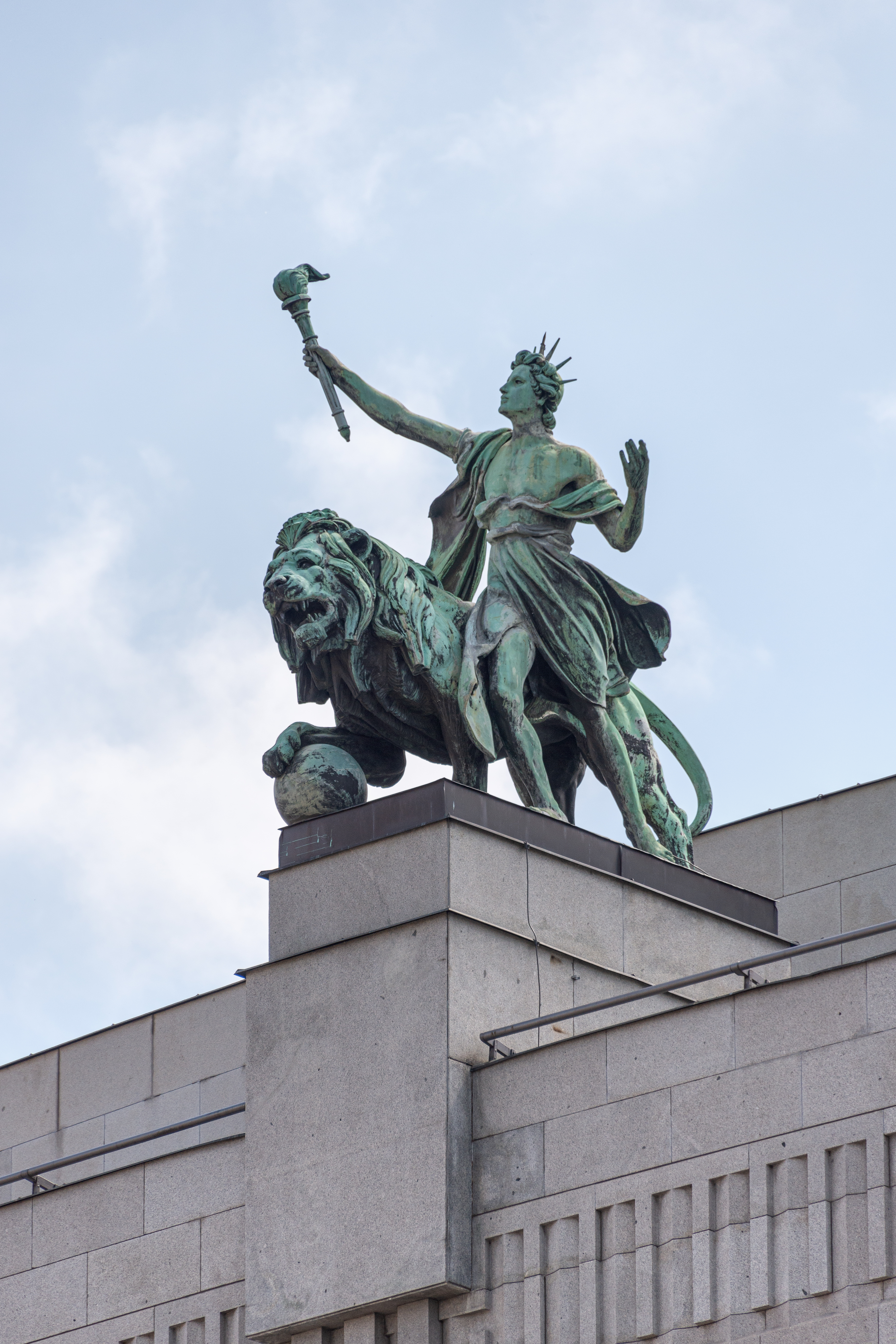
Lion, with guardian spirit, on the Czech National Bank; originally on the Živnostenská banka (1898–1938)

Antonín Popp (30 July 1850 – 10 June 1915) was a Czech sculptor, medallist and teacher.

== Life and work ==
Popp was born on 30 July 1850 in Prague. He was the second of five sons born to the sculptor and porcelain modeller, Ernst Popp, originally from Coburg, and his Czech wife Aloisie, née Bartoníčková. His older brother, Karel, became a photographer. His works are sometimes confused with his father's, as they worked together on several projects, and both signed their names as "AP" (Ernst is "Arnošt" in Czech).

After graduating from the local Realschule, he learned his trade in his father's workshop, while attending classes at the industrial school of the Jednota ku povzbuzení průmyslu v Čechách (Union for Encouraging Industry in Bohemia). In 1870, he began to study drawing at the Prague Academy of Fine Arts, but never completed the full course. Later, he made study trips to Munich and Vienna.

Upon returning to Prague, in 1873, he opened his own studio. He is best known for his monumental, decorative sculptures of historical and allegorical figures, most of which are on public buildings in Prague; including the Česká spořitelna (savings bank) and the original building of the Stock Exchange, which is now part of the New National Museum. He also created busts for the hallway of the National Theatre and the Pantheon of the National Museum.

Outside of Prague, his works may be seen in Domažlice, Pardubice and Kladno.

In addition to his sculpting, he taught modelling at Prague Polytechnic (now the Czech Technical University in Prague), where he became an associate professor in 1896. He also taught at the Academy of Arts, Architecture and Design (UMPRUM).

Popp died on 10 June 1915 in Prague. He is interred at Vinohrady Cemetery. A collection of his plaster models is stored at the National Museum.
