= Foreign currency account =

Transactional account denominated in another state's currency

Foreign currency account (FCA) is a transactional account denominated in a currency other than the home currency and can be maintained by a bank in the home country (onshore) or a bank in another country (offshore).

Foreign currency accounts are generally not covered by national deposit insurance schemes. However, such accounts are covered in the United States, within the usual limits, as long the financial institution is insured and the deposits are available for withdrawal inside the U.S.
