= Böhmische Escompte-Bank =

Former bank in Prague

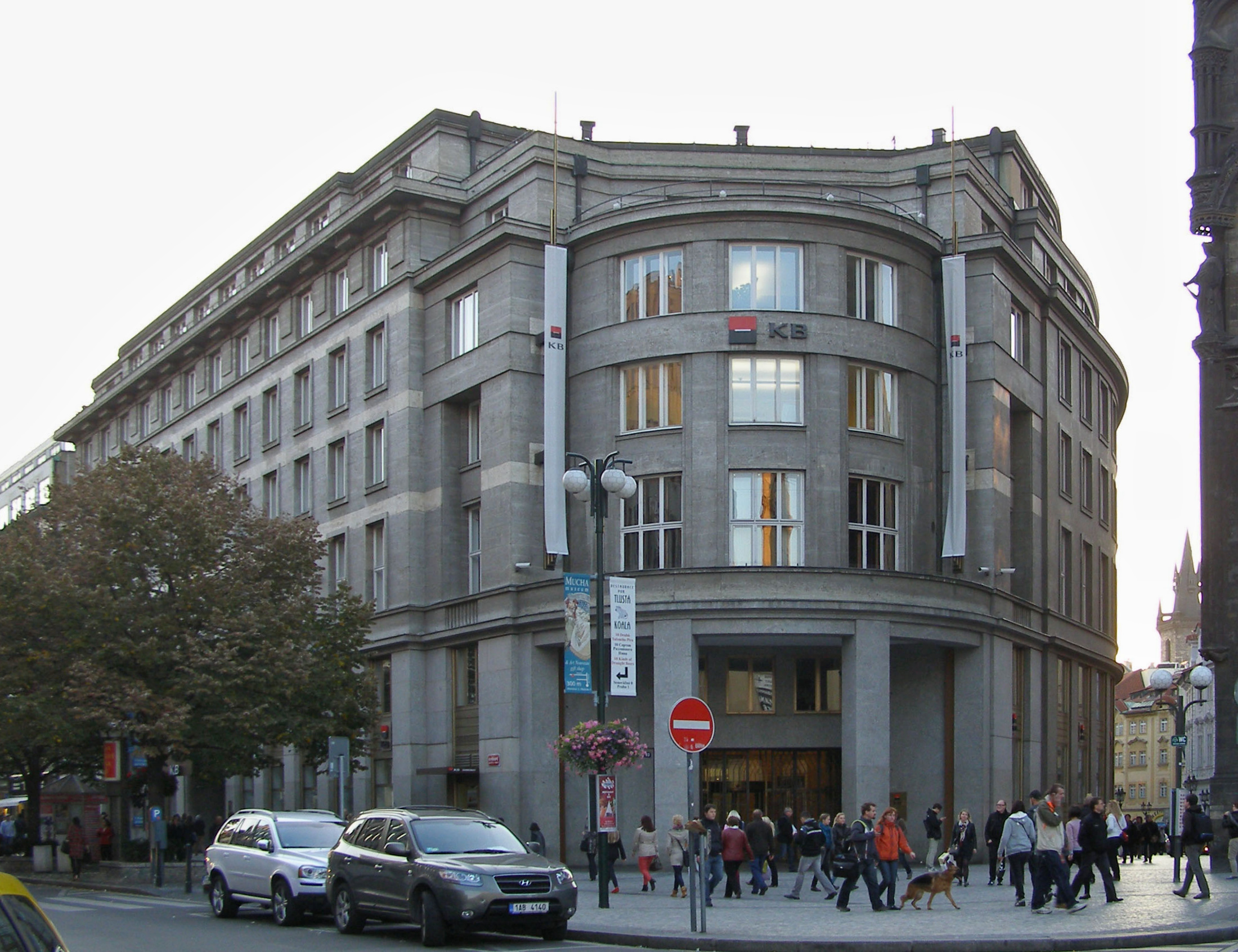
BEBCA head office in Prague, built in 1933 on a design by architect Karl Jaray

The Böhmische Escompte-Bank (German: [ˈbøːmɪʃə ʔɛsˈkõːtˌbaŋk]; Czech: Česká eskomptní banka [ˈtʃɛskaː ˈɛskontɲiː ˈbaŋka]; lit. 'Bohemian Discount Bank'; BEB) was a significant Prague-based bank with branches in most major towns of Bohemia and, later, Czechoslovakia. In 1919 it was renamed Böhmische Escompte-Bank und Credit-Anstalt (BEBCA). Its name was changed back to Böhmische Escompte-Bank in 1939, and it ceased activity in 1945.

== Austria-Hungary ==
The Böhmische Escompte Bank was founded in 1863 with sponsorship from the Vienna-based Niederösterreichische Escompte-Gesellschaft, aiming at promotion of industry with a main clientele of German-speakers and Bohemian Jews. In 1901, it was wholly taken over by the Niederösterreichische Escompte-Gesellschaft.

== Czechoslovakia ==
In 1919, the Niederösterreichische Escompte-Gesellschaft was expropriated under the Czechosolovak policy of "nostrification", and Prague-based Živnostenská banka became the bank's controlling shareholder. Also in 1919, the Böhmische Escompte-Bank took over the former operations of Creditanstalt (CA) in what had become Czechoslovakia, and had CA's former Prague branch building remodeled in 1924 by Karl Jaray. The bank subsequently changed its name to BEBCA. It ranked third or fourth among Czechoslovakia's joint-stock banks during most of the interwar period.

== Nazi era and aftermath ==
Immediately after the conclusion of the Munich Agreement, the management of BEBCA sought talks with Deutsche Bank and Dresdner Bank in early October 1938 in order to achieve the best possible sale of its Sudetenland branches. At that time, political or racial motives played a subordinate role in the takeover negotiations, which were conducted jointly with the Jewish and German-Bohemian members of the BEBCA management. The positions taken during the talks were determined exclusively by banking, business organization, and competition policy considerations.

However, the major German banks had a much greater interest in the far more powerful Živnostenská Banka, instead of the less significant and financially more vulnerable BEBCA. In contrast, the German political authorities recognized the need to cooperate with Czech companies if they were to achieve their goal of integrating Bohemia and Moravia economically into the new Greater German Reich. For this reason, the Reich Commissioner for Banking, Friedrich Ernst, rejected all attempts by German banks to take over Živnostenská.

After the creation of the Protectorate of Bohemia-Moravia, Dresdner Bank took a majority stake in BEBCA, which it renamed Böhmische Escompte Bank. It also took over the Commercial & Industrial Bank (Czech: Banka pro obchod a průmysl, German: Bank für Handel und Industrie, French: Banque du Commerce et de l’Industrie), previously the Czechoslovak affiliate of the Austrian Länderbank. During World War II the bank, headed by Rudolf Reiner, was one of the institutions participating in the so-called Reinhardt's fund, namely the confiscation of jewels, silver and gold from concentration camp inmates. It also financed construction of some of the concentration camps through commercial credits to the SS and its subsidiary DEST company. The bank ceased activity in 1945 under the Beneš decrees and was gradually liquidated afterwards.

From 1945 to 1960, the former head office of the bank in Prague was used as headquarters by the Central Secretariat of the Communist Party of Czechoslovakia. After that, it went to the pioneers of the Czechoslovak Youth Association. After the Velvet Revolution, it became the head office of the newly established Komerční banka, since 2001 a subsidiary of France's Société Générale.

== See also ==
- Živnostenská banka
- Anglo-Czechoslovak and Prague Credit Bank
- List of banks in the Czech Republic
