= Na příkopě =

Coordinates: 50°5′8″N 14°25′32.5″E

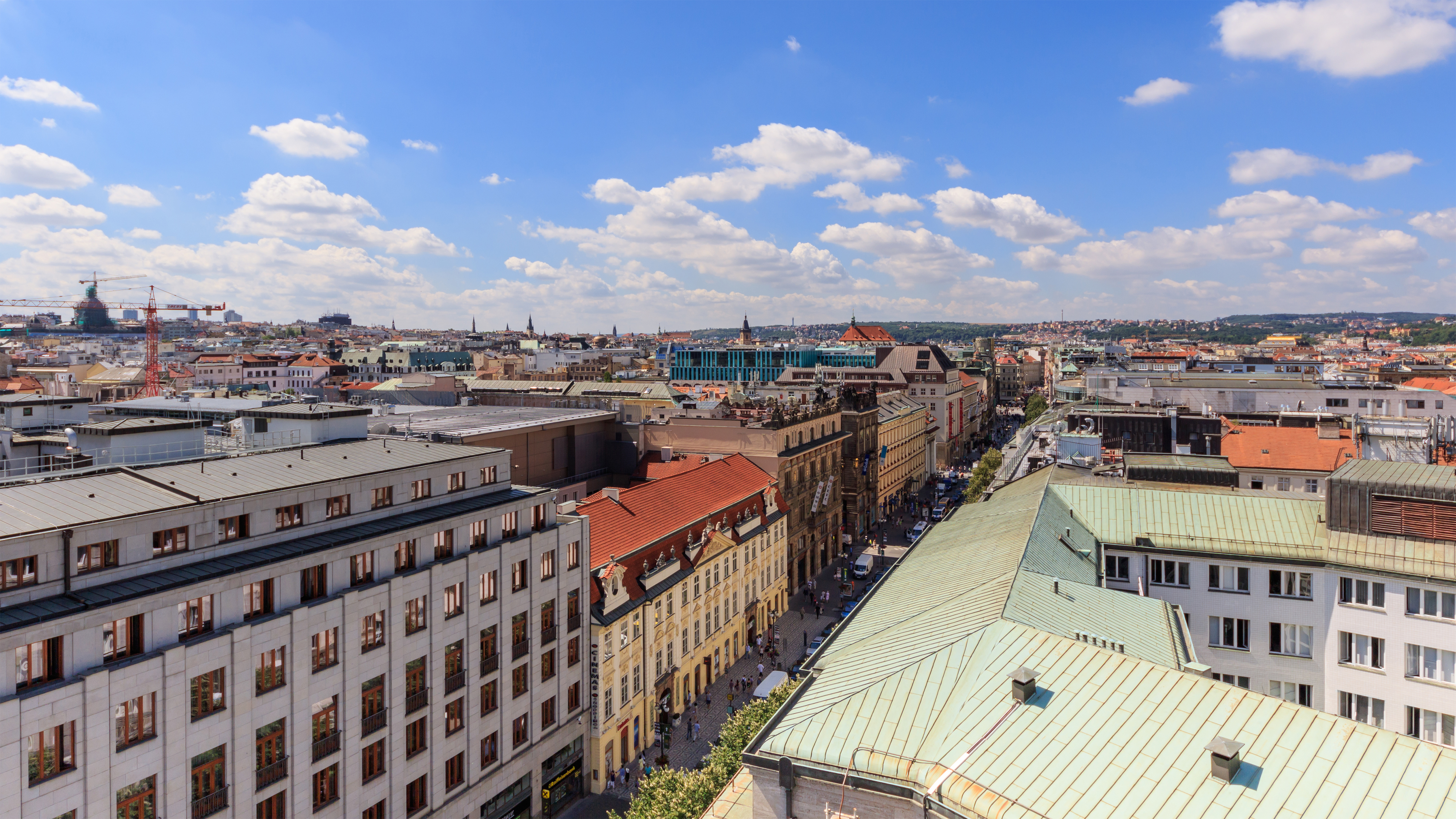
Na příkopě

Na příkopě (German: Graben, literally "On the moat"), informally also Na Příkopě, Na Příkopech or Příkopy, is a street in the center of Prague, Czech Republic, connecting Wenceslas Square with the Republic Square.

It separates the Old Town from the New Town. It is a place of representative buildings including the headquarters of the Czech National Bank, old palaces and luxurious shops.

Na příkopě is the most expensive street among the all states of the V4. In 2019, the amount of rent was 2,820 euros (72,478 CZK) per square meter per year, ranked 18th among the most expensive shopping streets in the world.

== History ==
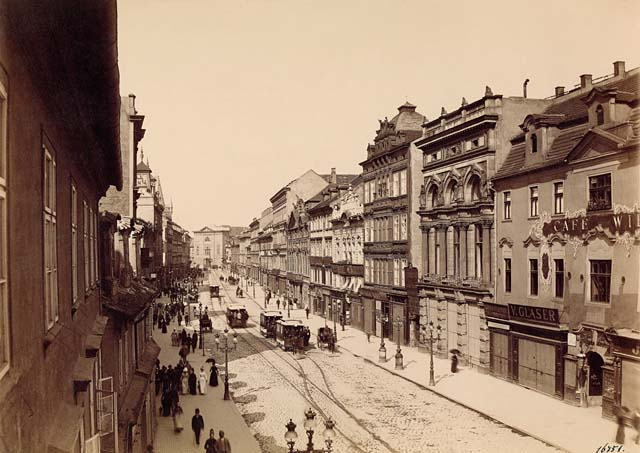
Tram line on the street in 1890

Na Příkopě street leads on the site of former 10-meter-wide and 8-meter-deep moat from 1234, which led along the medieval walls of the Old Town. Water flowed directly from the Vltava river and when the moat was filled, the Old Town formed a closed island. The moat was covered in 1760. After covering, chestnut trees were planted here and the street was named Ve starých alejích (In old alleys). In 1845-70 the street was named Kolowratská třída and since 1871 bears the name Na Příkopě.

Because it was one of the few very wide streets in Prague, it soon became a traffic artery. In 1875, the first line of the Prague horse-drawn tram was established here; in 1899, it was electrified. In 1919, Můstek became the first intersection in Prague to be controlled by a traffic policeman. In 1927, then the second intersection with the light signaling (the first being Hybernská-Dlážděná-Havlíčkova intersection).

In the 1960s, traffic jams were getting worse. However, in 1978 the metro station was opened at Můstek, and Line B followed the street since 1985 for almost its entire length to the Republic Square. Nearly century-old tram line was canceled in 1985 and the bustling urban street turned into a pedestrian zone. On the street appeared many new stores and it became an important business center of Prague promenade.
