= Petschek =

Petschek is a German-language surname of West Slavic origin, as a Germanization of Polish name/surname Pietrzyk or Czech "Petřek" - all eventually deriving from "Peter". Notable people with the surname include:

- Julius Petschek
- Frank C. Petschek
- Otto Petschek
- Isidor Petschek
