= Otto Petschek =

German-Jewish industrialist (1882–1934)

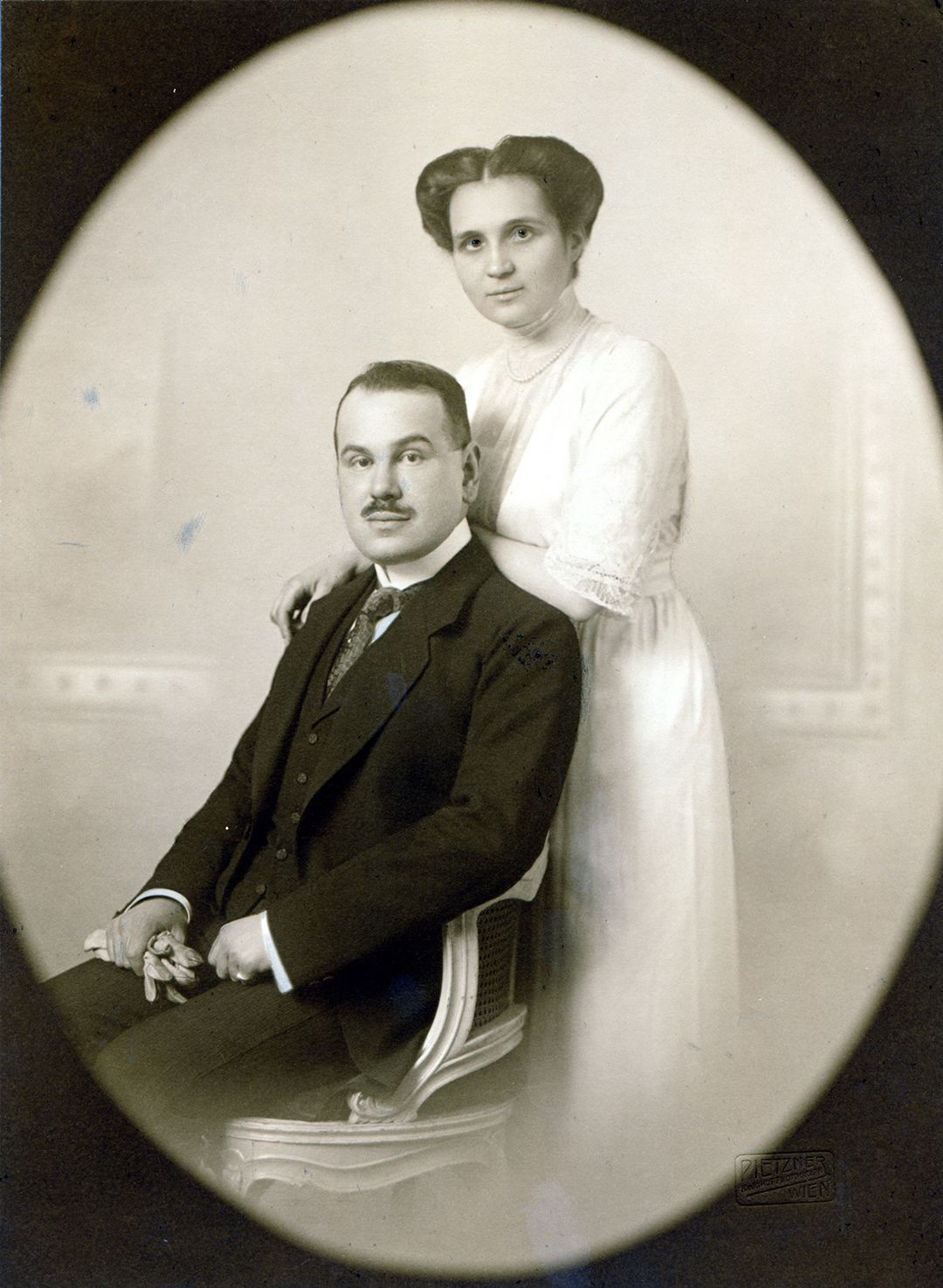
- Photograph of Petschek with his wife, Martha
- Born: 17 October 1882
- Died: 2 July 1934 (aged 51); Vienna, Austria
- Resting place: New Jewish Cemetery, Prague
- Occupation: Industrialist
- Spouse: Martha Popper
- Children: 4
- Parent(s): Isidor Petschek; Camilla Robitschek
- Relatives: Frank C. Petschek (cousin); Julius Petschek (uncle)

Otto Petschek (17 October 1882 – 2 July 1934) was a European industrialist known for building the Petschek Villa in Prague.

== Early life ==
He was the eldest of four sons of Isidor Petschek and Camilla (née Robitschek) Petschek, who were German speaking Jews. His younger brothers were Paul (1886–1946), Friedrich (1890–1940) and Hans (1895–1968), who later served as president of the family's investment firm, United Continental Corporation.

Among his family were uncles Julius Petschek and Ignaz Petschek, all of whom were originally from Kolín. Among his first cousins was Frank C. Petschek, a son of his uncle Ignaz.

== Career ==
The Petschek family founded various international mining and chemical enterprises in Prague, Czechoslovakia (now Czech Republic). Their concern controlled also 30% of the German and, in total, almost 50% of the European brown coal mining industry in the years after World War I. In 1920, his uncle Julius founded the Petschek Brothers Bank (Bankhaus Petschek & Co.). Between 1923 and 1929, the family built Petschek Palace. His cousin Walter (Julius' son) and Otto's brother Hans Petschek ran the company until 1938 when they moved to New York as a consequence of the Munich Agreement.

After the death of his uncle, Ignatz Petschek, Otto was considered the head of the Petschek family.

== Personal life ==
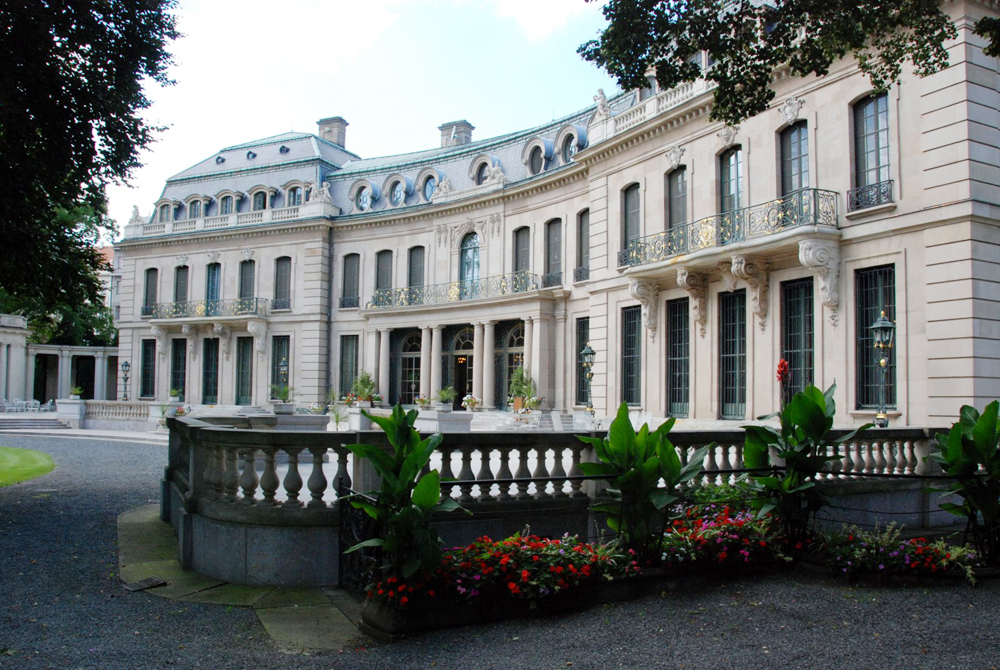
The Petschek Villa in Prague.

Petschek was married to Magda "Martha" Popper, the daughter of JUDr. Julius Popper. An optimist, Otto built the Petschek Villa in Prague in the early 1920s between the two World Wars. Today it is home to the U.S. Ambassador to the Czech Republic. Together, they were the parents of four children:

- Viktor Petschek (1914–2005), who married Miriam Rachel "Mary" Fogelman.
- Eva Petschek (1920–2014), who married the journalist Robert B. Goldmann, an immigrant from Germany. She lived in New York City.
- Rita Petschek (1922–2006), who married Alexandre Kafka, son of Bruno Kafka, a member of the parliament of Czechoslovakia .
- Ina Louise Petschek (b. 1922), who married Adolf Schlesinger.

Petschek died on 2 July 1934 in Vienna, Austria. He was buried at the New Jewish Cemetery in Prague. His widow died on 9 May 1940 in Toronto, Canada.

=== Descendants ===
In December 1966, Otto's granddaughter, Angela Conway Petschek, was married to Alain Patrick Maze-Sencier of Paris and New York, the Count de Brouville. Alain was a son of Jean Maze-Sencier and the late Nicole Maze-Sencier, Countess de Brouville. Angela Conway Petschek was the daughter of Mrs. Viktor Petschek and the late Capt. Sydney Conway of the British Army Medical Corps. She was the adopted daughter of Mr. Petschek.
