= Isidor Petschek =

German Bohemian lawyer (1854–1919)

- Born: 15 March 1854; Kolín, Bohemia, Austrian Empire
- Died: 18 June 1919 (aged 65); Prague, Czechoslovakia
- Occupations: Lawyer and entrepreneur
- Known for: Founded the Prague branch of the Petschek business dynasty

Isidor Petschek (15 March 1854 – 18 June 1919) was a German Bohemian lawyer and entrepreneur. Together with his brother Julius Petschek, he founded the Prague branch of the Petschek business dynasty, which was one of the richest Jewish families in Europe in the late 19th and early 20th centuries.

== Early life and education ==
Isidor Petschek was born on 15 March 1854 in Kolín, Bohemia. He was the first-born child of Moses Petschek (1822–1888) and Sara Petschek, née Wiener (1827–1894). He had a sister, Rosa Petschek (1855–1934), and two brothers, Julius Petschek (1856–1932) and Ignaz Petschek (1857–1934). The family was German-speaking.

Together, Isidor and Julius Petschek attended the k.k. Gymnasium in Plzeň and boarding school. Together they studied law at the German-speaking Charles University after completing their A-levels. Isidor Petschek completed his seven-month court clerkship from December 1877 to June 1878 at the Imperial and Royal Bohemian Higher Regional Court in Prague and graduated as Dr. iur.

Two years later, his brother Julius also obtained his doctorate. While Isidor Petschek opened a law firm in Prague, Julius Petschek initially worked in the civil service at the Imperial and Royal Bohemian Procurator's Office. Isidor Petschek married in 1881. His marriage to Camilla Robitschek produced four sons: Otto (1882–1934), Paul (1886–1946), Friedrich (1890–1940) and Hans (1895–1968). A short time later, Julius Petschek also married Bertha Robitschek, the sister of Isidor Petschek's wife. The marriage between Julius and Bertha Petschek produced three children, who spent their childhood together with the children of Isidor and Camilla Petschek.

== Business and banking ==
After the death of their father, Moses Petschek died in Prague on 30 July 1888, Isidor Petschek's law firm developed into the center of the family empire. The brothers successively acquired shares in companies in the coal, paper, glass and chemical industries. In 1894, Isidor Petschek was elected to the supervisory board of Brüxer Kohlen-Bergbau-Gesellschaft as vice president. From this point onwards, the name Petschek became synonymous with lignite in Austria-Hungary. Brüxer Kohlen-Bergbau-Gesellschaft was regarded as the largest coal mining company in the Danube Monarchy. The company's shares were among the Petscheks' most important objects of speculation on the Vienna Stock Exchange. Moses Petschek had already acquired the company's first securities in 1871.

At the beginning of the 20th century, Julius Petschek gave up his civil service and became a business partner of Isidor Petschek. They thus founded the "Prague line" of the Petschek family. This was opposed by the "Aussiger Linie" of their brother Ignaz Petschek's family. Ignaz Petschek had shown little interest in school and studies. He left grammar school after the 6th grade, but had inherited a great entrepreneurial talent and his father's ruthlessness in business. In 1880, at the age of 23, he founded his first coal trading company in Aussig and was regarded as the inventor of the coal commission business.

Initially together, the Petschek brothers expanded abroad from 1905 onwards by acquiring shares in mining companies and joining the supervisory boards of coal companies and banks. In Germany, the brothers brought 27.8% of the lignite industry under their control in this way by 1912. In 1913, Ignaz Petschek succeeded in the spectacular takeover of Hohenlohe Werke AG in Upper Silesia, thereby penetrating the East Elbe lignite region without the involvement of his brothers. In contrast, Isidor and Julius Petschek acquired the majority of the Brüxer Kohlen-Bergbau-Gesellschaft in 1917 and excluded Ignaz Petschek from a shareholding. It was at this time that the final break between the "Prague Petscheks" and the "Aussiger Petscheks" occurred.

From 1906, Julius Petschek was a member of the supervisory board of the Anglo-Austrian Bank in Vienna. Together they founded the "Prager Kommorzgesellschaft GmbH" in 1917 to manage their financial transactions and in the same year, demonstratively in their brother's territory, the "Aussiger Montangesellschaft mbH". Through this company, the Prague Petscheks managed the sale of coal throughout northern Bohemia, which meant that Ignaz Petschek completely lost his sales opportunities in the northern Bohemian lignite mining region. In addition, Isidor and Julius Petschek acquired the majority of shares in Nordböhmische Kohlenwerke AG in Brüx and, following the complete takeover of Montan- und Industrialwerke A.G., vorm. J.D. Starck, they gained a decisive position in the Falkenau coalfield, the second largest lignite basin in what was then Austria-Hungary.

After the First World War, Isidor and Julius acquired interests in many other industrial and financial sectors throughout Europe. Ultimately, the Petschek dynasty controlled a total of 50 percent of European coal production and 30 percent of German lignite plants. East of the Elbe, their share fluctuated between 66 and 70 percent. Isidor and Julius Petschek also became the main shareholders of the Bohemian Escompte Bank and the Bohemian Union Bank as well as shareholders in several banking houses in Germany, Holland, Spain, England and the USA. Their holdings included:

- Bankhaus Petschek & Co., Prague (from 1920)
- Anhaltische Kohlenwerke AG, Halle (Saale)
- Werschen-Weißenfelser Braunkohlen AG, Halle (Saale)
- Nordböhmische Kohlenwerke AG, Brüx
- Brüxer Kohlen-BIsidor
- Aussiger Montangesellschaft mbH, Aussig

Petschek did not live to see the founding of the Petschek & Co. bank, which prospered to become the largest private bank in the First Czechoslovak Republic. He suffered from atherosclerosis, but until his death he was regarded as the "head" of the Prague Petscheks and the actual founder of the Petschek & Co. bank. In the business world, he was known as "Big Petschek" and Ignaz Petschek as "Little Petschek". Isidor Petschek died of coronary thrombosis on 18 June 1919 in Prague, at the age of 66. His grave is located in the New Jewish Cemetery in Prague.

== Descendants ==
After his death, his first-born son Otto became the head of the family. His uncle Julius entrusted him with the administration of all the joint property, including the management of the Petschek & Co. bank. Isidor Petschek's second-born son, Paul Petschek, represented the family interests in Germany from October 1928 and lived in Berlin-Wannsee. From May 1936, he was the family representative in London. Julius Petschek died in January 1932 and Otto Petschek in July 1934.

When the Nazis came to power, the Petscheks were persecuted and their businesses Aryanized. The Petscheks from Prague then sold their shares in the company in Central Europe and established themselves first in England and from 1938 in the USA.

The immense wealth of the family dynasty is evidenced by 13 luxurious villas in Prague. Three of them now serve as residences for the Chinese, Russian and US embassies.

== See also ==
- Aryanization
- Coal industry
- The Holocaust in Bohemia and Moravia
- Petschek Villa
