= New Jewish Cemetery, Prague =

Cemetery established in 1889

New Jewish Cemetery
- Nový židovský hřbitov
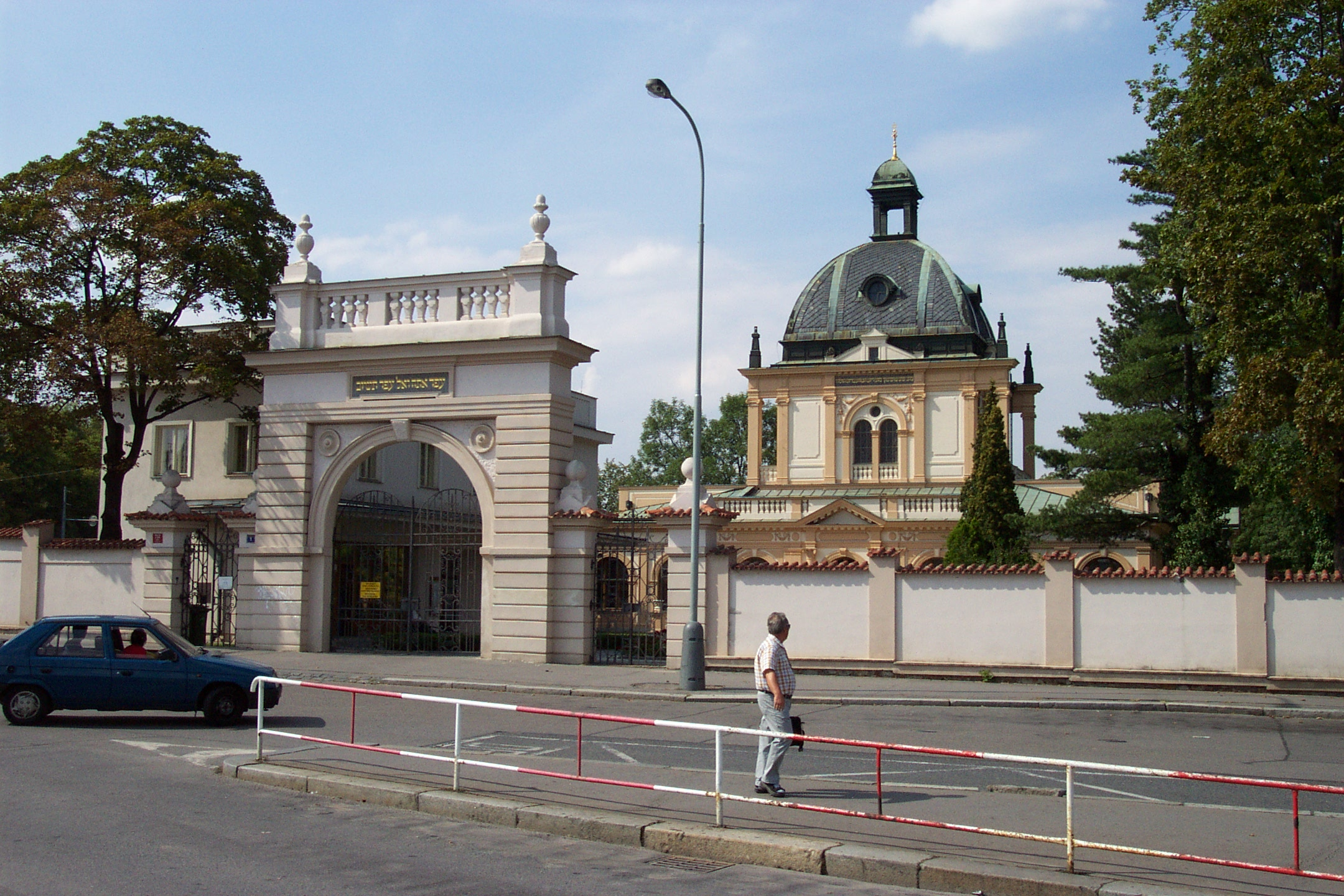
- Entrance gate
- Interactive map of New Jewish Cemetery

Details
- Established: 1889–1990
- Location: Prague-Žižkov
- Country: Czech Republic
- Coordinates: 50°4′49″N 14°28′36″E
- Type: Judaic
- Style: Art Nouveau
- Owned by: The Jewish Community in Prague
- Find a Grave: New Jewish Cemetery

The New Jewish Cemetery (Czech: Nový židovský hřbitov) in Žižkov, Prague, Czech Republic, was established in 1890 to relieve the space problem at the Old Jewish cemetery in Žižkov, where the Žižkov Television Tower now stands. As of 1964 it is declared as a cultural monument.

== History ==
The cemetery that was founded in 1889 was officially opened on 6 July 1890, even though the first funeral took place two days earlier. The cemetery was designed to be 10 times bigger than the Old Jewish Cemetery in Josefov and provides space for approximately 100,000 graves, therefore having the capacity to serve for a century. But in 1920 and 1933 it was expanded and a new ceremonial hall was built too.

There is also a specially designated area for urns, though the Jewish tradition does not allow cremation. The cemetery is still in use today and operated by the Jewish Community in Prague.

== Ceremonial Halls ==
The cemetery has today two ceremonial halls. The first and oldest one that was designed by architects Bedřich Münzberger and Alfons Wertmiler, was built between 1891 and 1893. It is located at the highest part of the cemetery next to the entrance. Behind it is the ''beit tahara'' (house of purification) and a mortuary designed in a classic style, that is used by the Funeral society.

The second ceremonial hall was built in 1933 by architect Leopold Ehrmann, in a functionalist style at the new eastern area .

== Gravestones ==
In the cemetery there are around 25,000 preserved gravestones in the Art Nouveau style. Some of them are memorials and symbolic graves for Holocaust victims. Other memorial gravestones belong to well known people in various fields, including politics, culture and industry. Among the notable families are Petschek, Waldes family that the last pieces of art made by the important Czech sculptor Josef Václav Myslbek, creator of the Wenceslas Square famous statue of St. Wenceslas, and Bondy family.

Other notable people buried there are the authors Franz Kafka, Jiří Orten, Ota Pavel, František R. Kraus, Arnošt Lustig, and Lenka Reinerová, artists Jiří Kars and Max Horb (whose tomb was designed by Jan Štursa in the form of a mourning peacock), and singers Ladislav Blum and Rabbi Gustav Sicher.

In 2001, a symbolic tomb was unveiled in the open area of the new section, containing remains exhumed from the site of Prague's oldest Jewish cemetery, in the area known as the Jewish Garden.

== Notable interments ==
- Oskar Baum (1883–1941), music educator and writer
- Alois Epstein (1849–1918), pediatrician
- Vilém Flusser (1934–1996), philosopher, writer and journalist
- Juraj Herz (1934–2018), Slovak film director
- Franz Kafka (1883–1924), writer
- Eugen von Kahler (1882–1911), painter
- Georges Kars (1880–1945), painter
- František R. Kraus (1903–1967), writer
- Egon Lánský (1934–2013), politician and journalist
- Arne Laurin (1889–1945), journalist
- Arnošt Lustig (1926–2011), writer
- Heda Margolius Kovály (1919–2010), writer and translator
- Jiří Orten (1919–1941), poet
- Ota Pavel (1930–1973), journalist and author
- Julius Petschek (1856–1932), industrialist
- Otto Petschek (1860–1923), industrialist
- Yvonne Přenosilová (1947–2023), singer and presenter
- Lenka Reinerová (1916–2008), writer, translator and journalist
- Gustav Sicher (1880–1960), chief rabbi and translator
- Petr Skoumal (1938–2014), musician and composer
- Jindřich Waldes (1876–1941), industrialist and philanthropist
- Jiří Weiss (1912–2004), film director and screenwriter
