= Gustav Sicher =

Gustav Sicher (August 31, 1880 in Klatovy – October 5, 1960) was a chief rabbi of Prague.

Sicher was a student at the Vienna Rabbinical Seminary and also studied philosophy at Charles University under Tomáš Garrigue Masaryk. He first held rabbinical office in 1905 in Náchod, and took part in Zionist organizations, participating in Mizrachi and founding an organization called the Sinai Association. During World War I, he served as a Feldrabbiner (chaplain) in the Austrian army. In 1921, he ran for office as a candidate of the Jewish Party (Židovská strana). He served as rabbi of the synagogue of Vinohrady in Prague from 1928 until he emigrated to Palestine in 1939. While in Palestine, he founded a synagogue for Czech Jews in Jerusalem. He was invited to be chief rabbi of Prague in 1945 and returned in 1947. Upon his death in 1960, Sicher was succeeded as chief rabbi of Prague by Richard Feder.

Sicher produced the first translation of the Torah into Czech, which he started in 1932-1939 with Isidor Hirsch and did not complete until 1950.

Gustav Sicher is buried at the New Jewish Cemetery in Prague, together with his wife, Elsa.

== Publications ==
- Volte život. Sborník z prací a úvah dr. Gustava Sichra. (lit. Choose Life) Praha : Rada židovských náboženských obcí v Praze, 1975. Collection of sermons, speeches and articles
- Rada židovských náboženských obcí (Council of Jewish Religious Communities), Jewish Studies: Essays in Honour of the Very Reverend Dr Gustav Sicher, Chief Rabbi of Prague (Prague, 1955)
