= Anglo-Czechoslovak and Prague Credit Bank =

Former bank in Prague

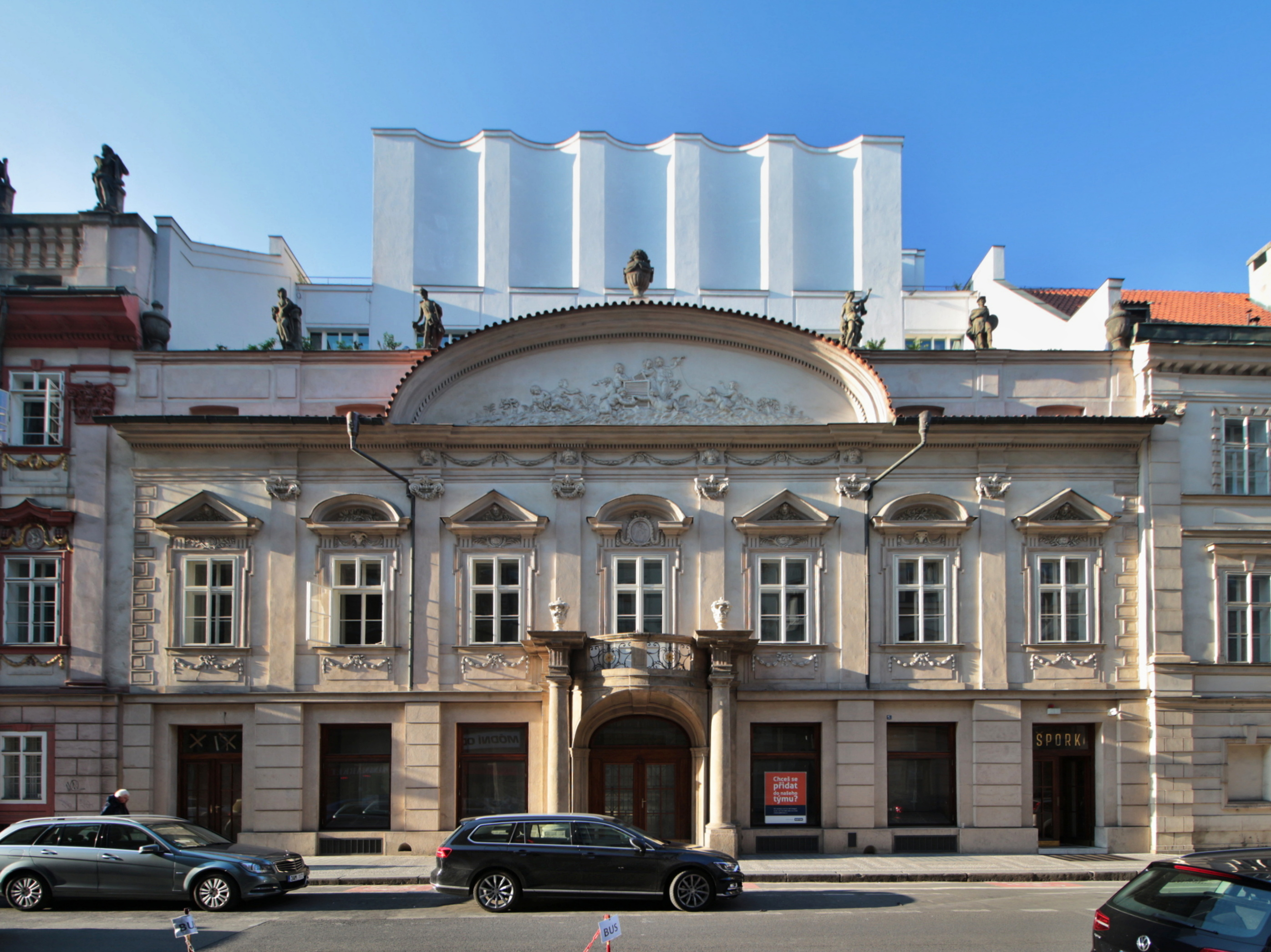
Former head office of the Anglo-Czechoslovak and Prague Credit Bank on Hybernská 5, Prague

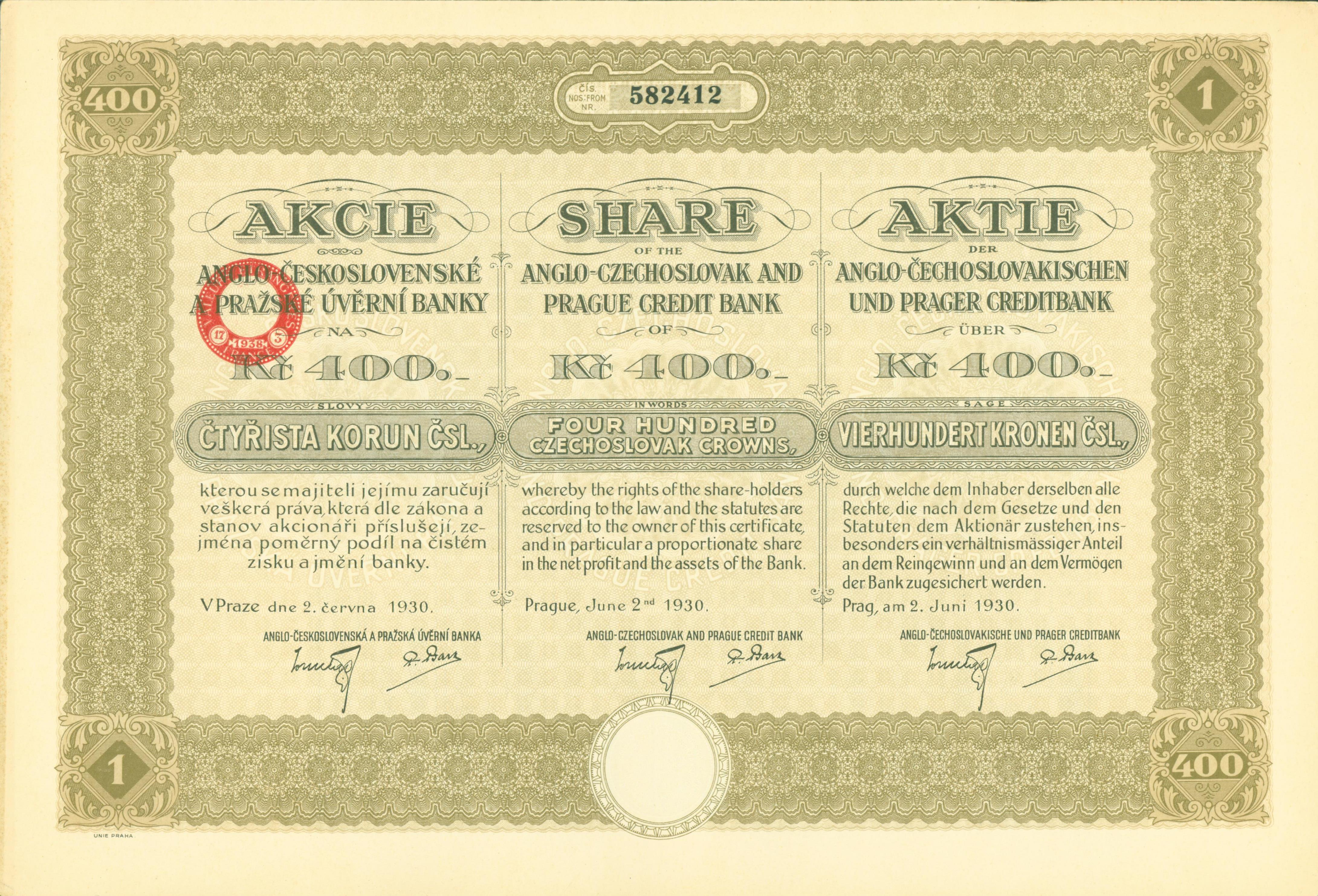
Trilingual share certificate of the newly formed Anglo-Czechoslovak and Prague Credit Bank, 1930

The Anglo-Czechoslovak and Prague Credit Bank (Czech: Anglo-československá a Pražská úvěrní banka, German: Anglo-Tschechoslowakische und Prager Creditbank), also known as Anglobanka, was the second-largest bank in Czechoslovakia during the 1930s. It resulted from the merger in 1930 of three Prague-based banks:

- the Anglo-Czechoslovak Bank (also Anglobanka, Czech: Anglo-československá banka, German: Anglo-Tschechoslowakische Bank), created in 1922 from the former activities of Anglo-Austrian Bank in the country
- the Prague Credit Bank (Czech: Pražská úvěrní banka or PÚB, German: Prager Creditbank), originally established in 1870 as Credit Bank in Kolín (Czech: Úvěrní banka v Kolíně) and relocated to Prague in 1899
- the Czech Commercial Bank (Czech: Česká komerční banka, German: Böhmische Kommerzialbank), established in 1921 from the former activities of Austria's Mercurbank

Following the establishment of the Protectorate of Bohemia and Moravia, the merged entity was renamed the Anglo-Prague Credit Bank (German: Anglo-Prager Creditbank, Czech: Anglo-Pražská úvěrní banka) in 1939, then again Prague Credit Bank in 1940. It was nationalized in 1946 and eventually absorbed in 1948 by Živnostenská banka.

== Anglo-Czechoslovak Bank ==
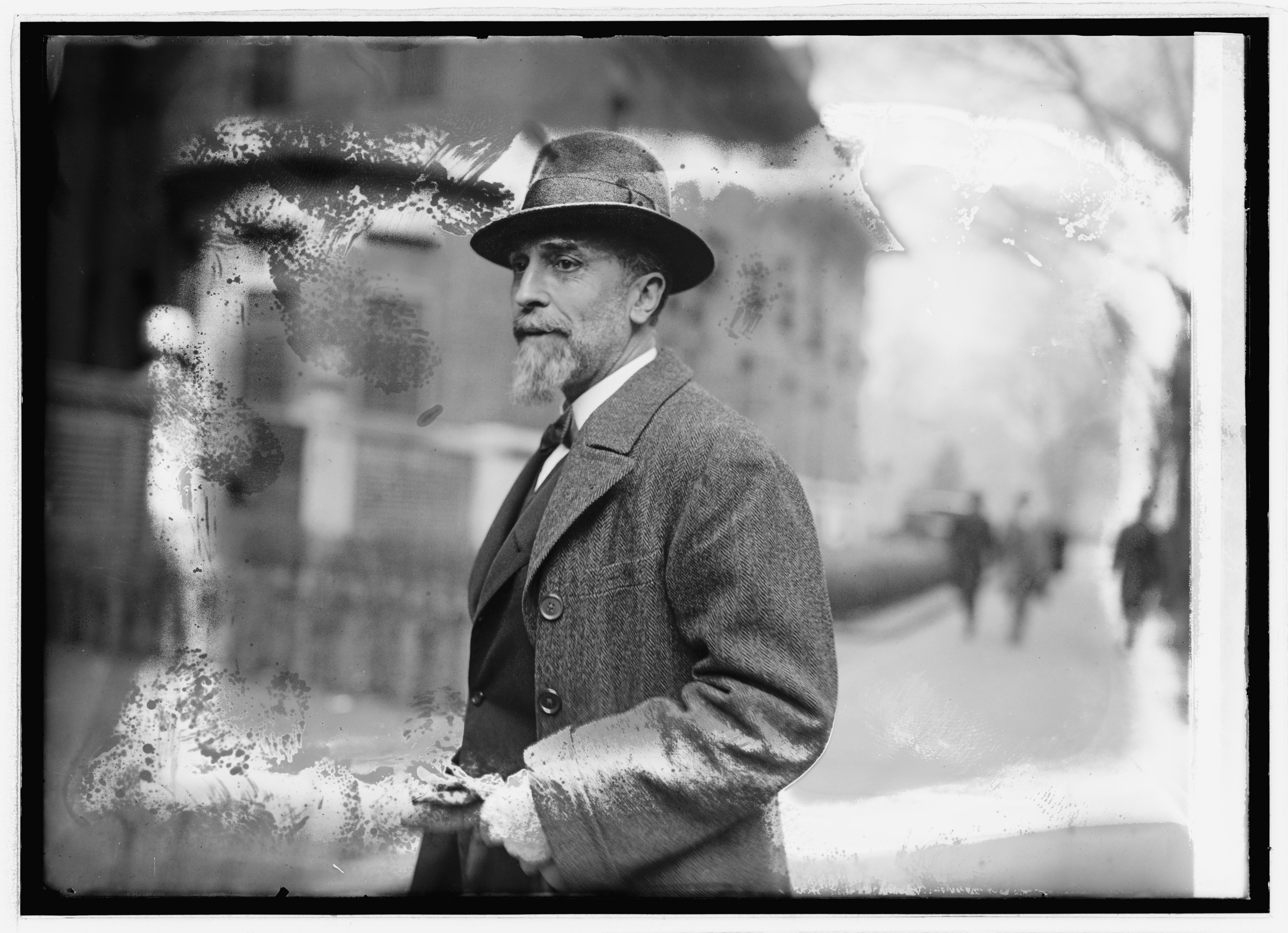
Montagu Norman (1871-1950) was instrumental in the formation of Anglo-Czechoslovak Bank in 1922

The Anglo-Austrian Bank opened a branch in Prague in 1880. Following the collapse of the Habsburg Monarchy in late 1918, more than 50% of the bank's assets were in what became Czechoslovakia and Yugoslavia, and 45 percent of its capital was held by Czechoslovak shareholders. The Bank of England soon became a major shareholder, through the mediation of the Petschek family and under direct watch of Governor Montagu Norman, and transferred the bank's head office to London.

Montagu Norman then negotiated an exemption from Czechoslovakia's policy of "nostrification" of the banking sector, allowing it to retain control of its Czech operations even though it placed them in a newly formed subsidiary, the Anglo-Czechoslovak Bank formally established on 12 April 1922. At the time of its establishment, it was larger (by either capital or total assets) than any of the nostrified banks, even though some long-established domestic banks were larger, namely the Böhmische Escompte-Bank (est. 1863), Živnostenská Banka (est. 1869), Böhmische Union Bank (est. 1872), Zemská Banka (est. 1890), and Böhmische Industriebank (est. 1898).

In 1923, the Anglo-Czechoslovak Bank opened a branch of its own in London. The Anglo-Austrian Bank, by then renamed as Anglo-International Bank, sold most of its shares in the later 1920s.

=== Buildings ===
In the 1920s, the Anglo-Czechoslovak Bank commissioned architect Josef Gočár for the remodeling of its head office in Prague, in the Sweerts-Sporck Palace which it had acquired in the early 20th century, and for the building of new branches in several Czechoslovak cities, including a notable exemplar of Czech Cubism at the Anglobanka branch building in Hradec Králové.

Gočár's remodeling of the Prague head office from 1923 to 1926 was an early example of facadism. The property was purchased in 2011 by developer SEBRE, which branded it the Spork Palace after renovating it from 2014 to 2018 on an award-winning design by architect Stanislav Fiala. SEBRE sold the Spork Palace to Generali in 2019.

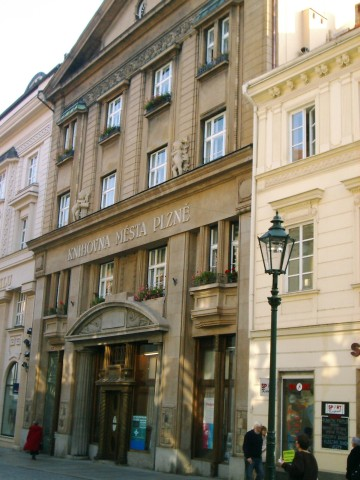
Former Anglo-Austrian Bank branch in Plzeň, built in 1914

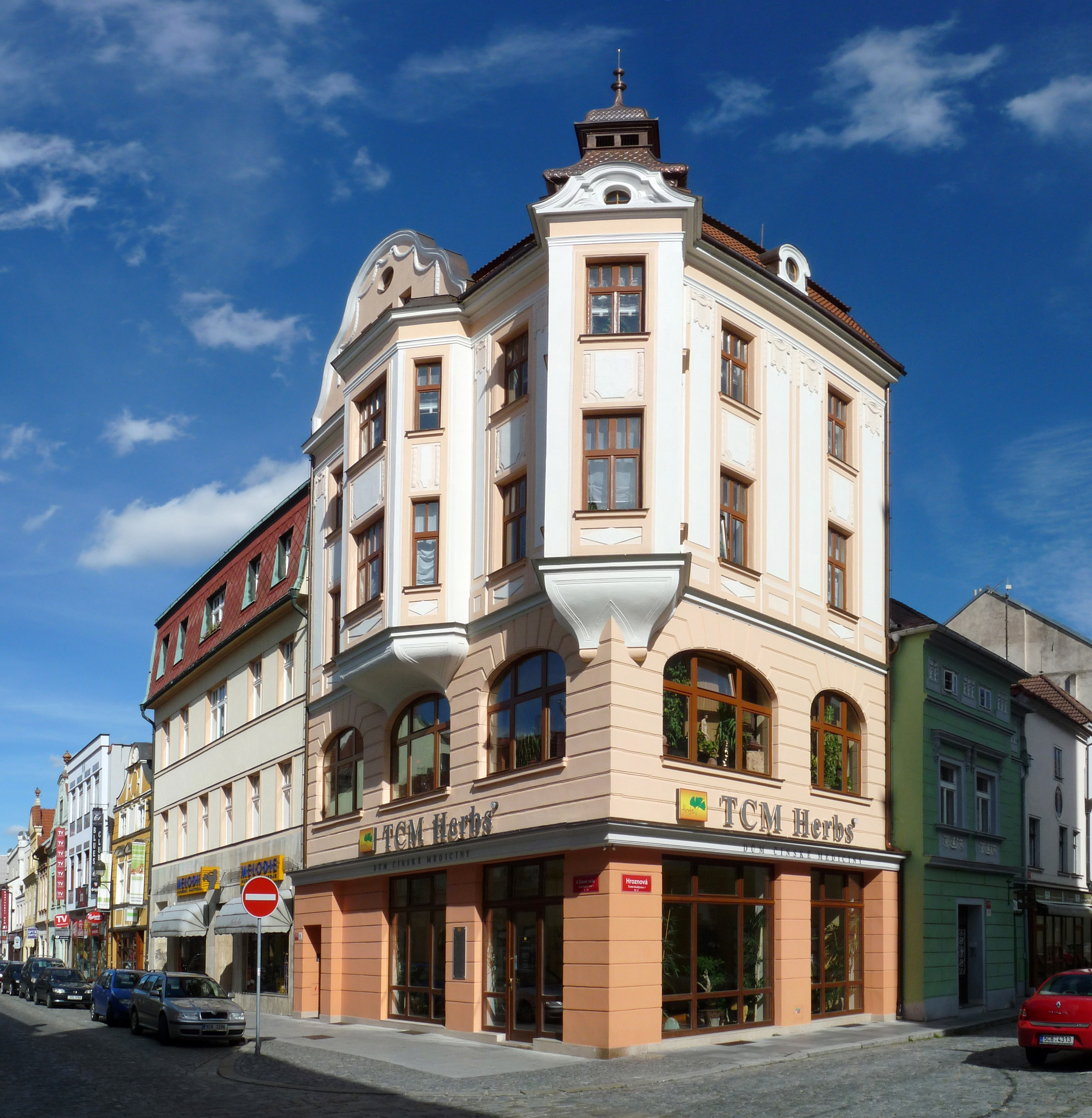
Former branch in České Budějovice

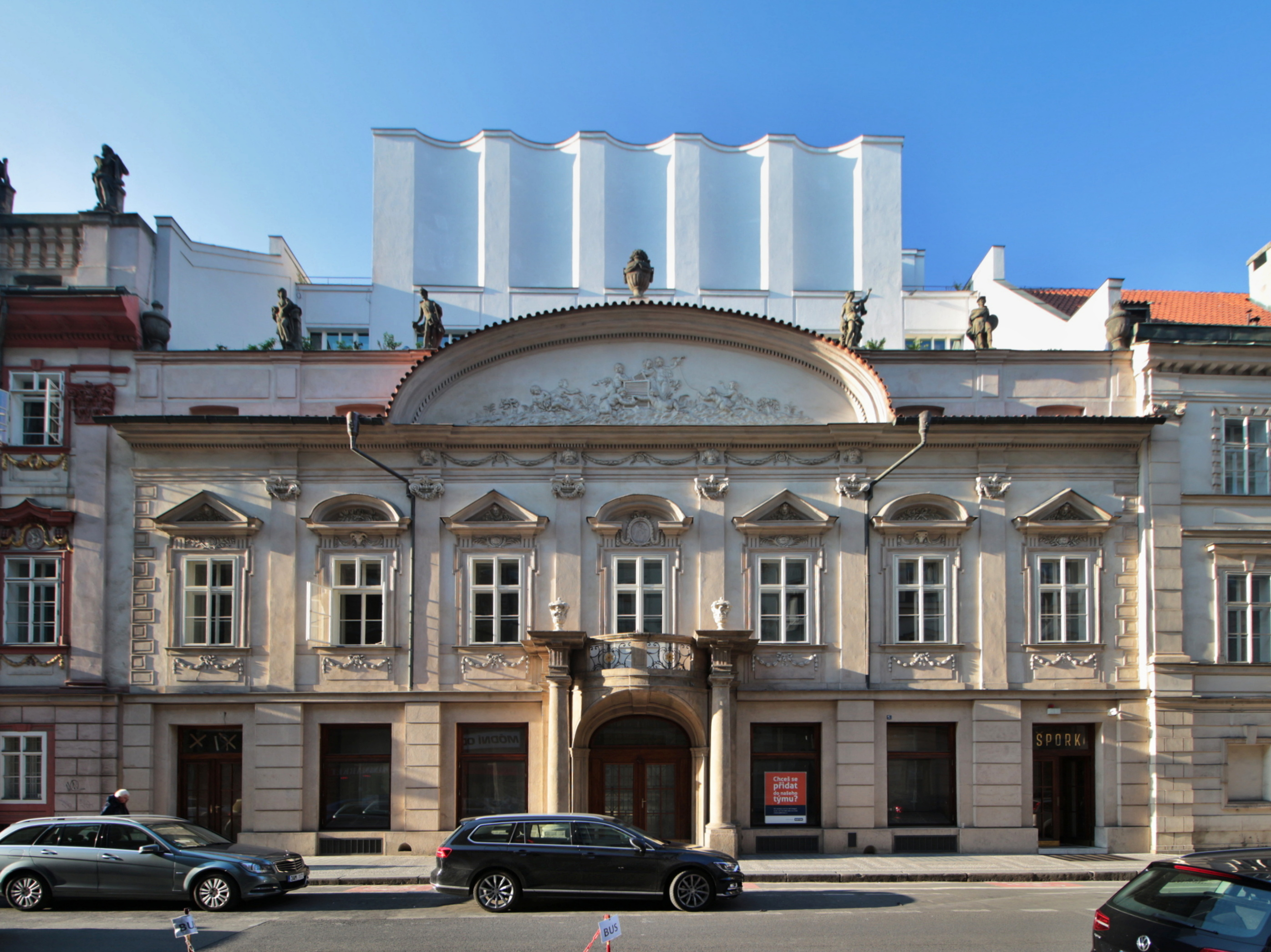
Prague head office, with the remodeling designed by Josef Gočár visible in the background

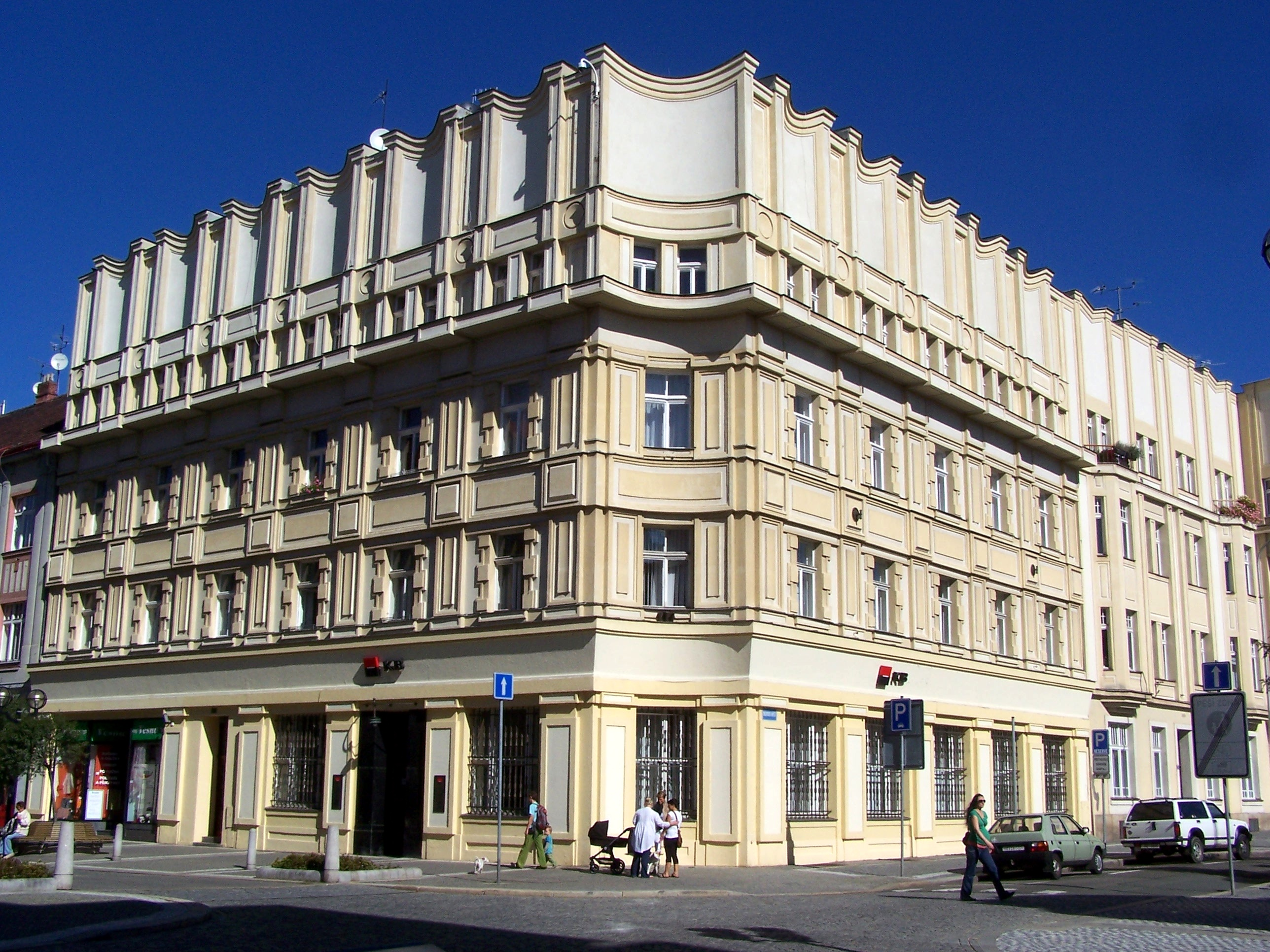
Former branch in Hradec Králové, designed by Gočár

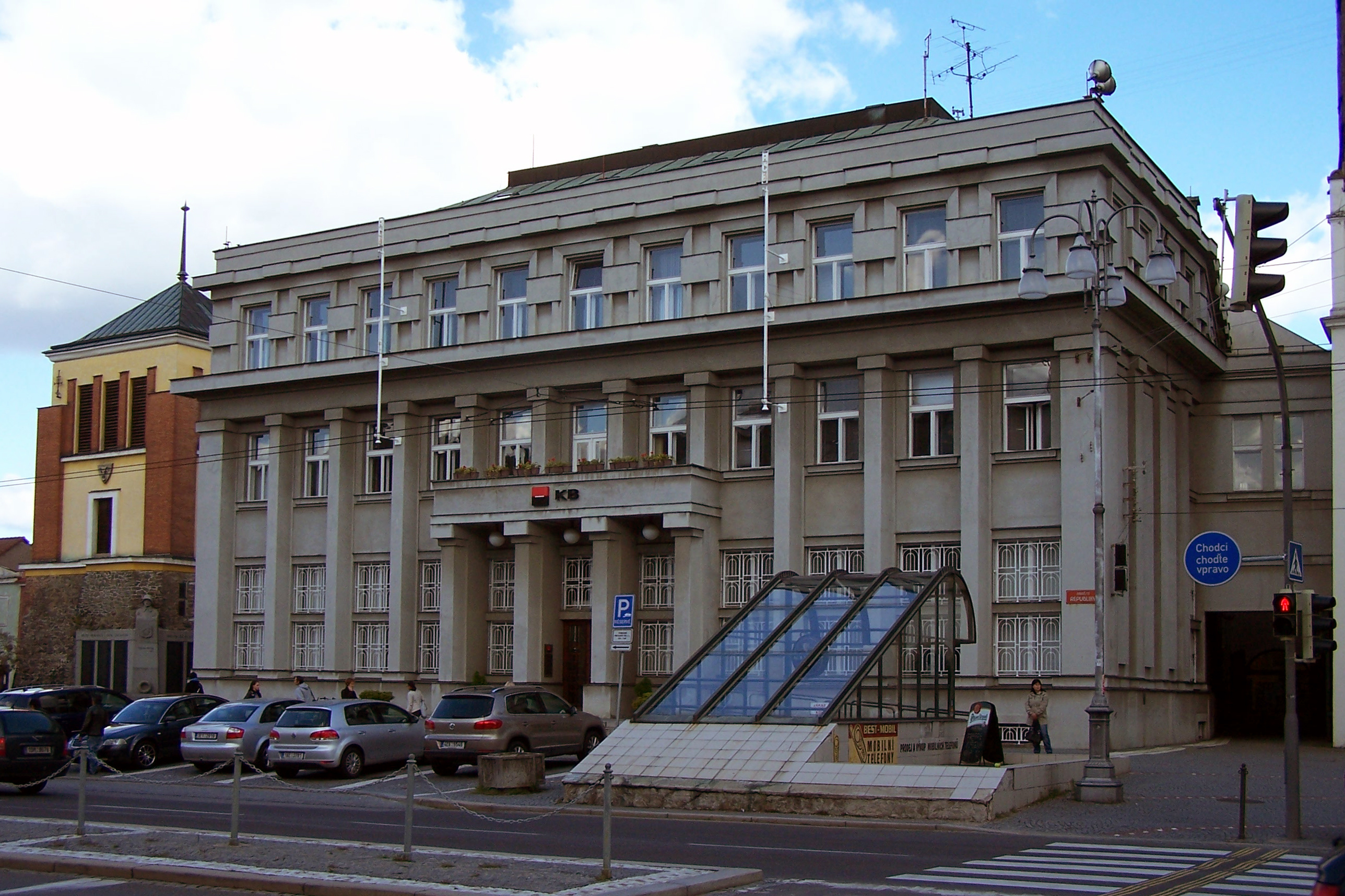
Former branch in Pardubice, designed by Gočár

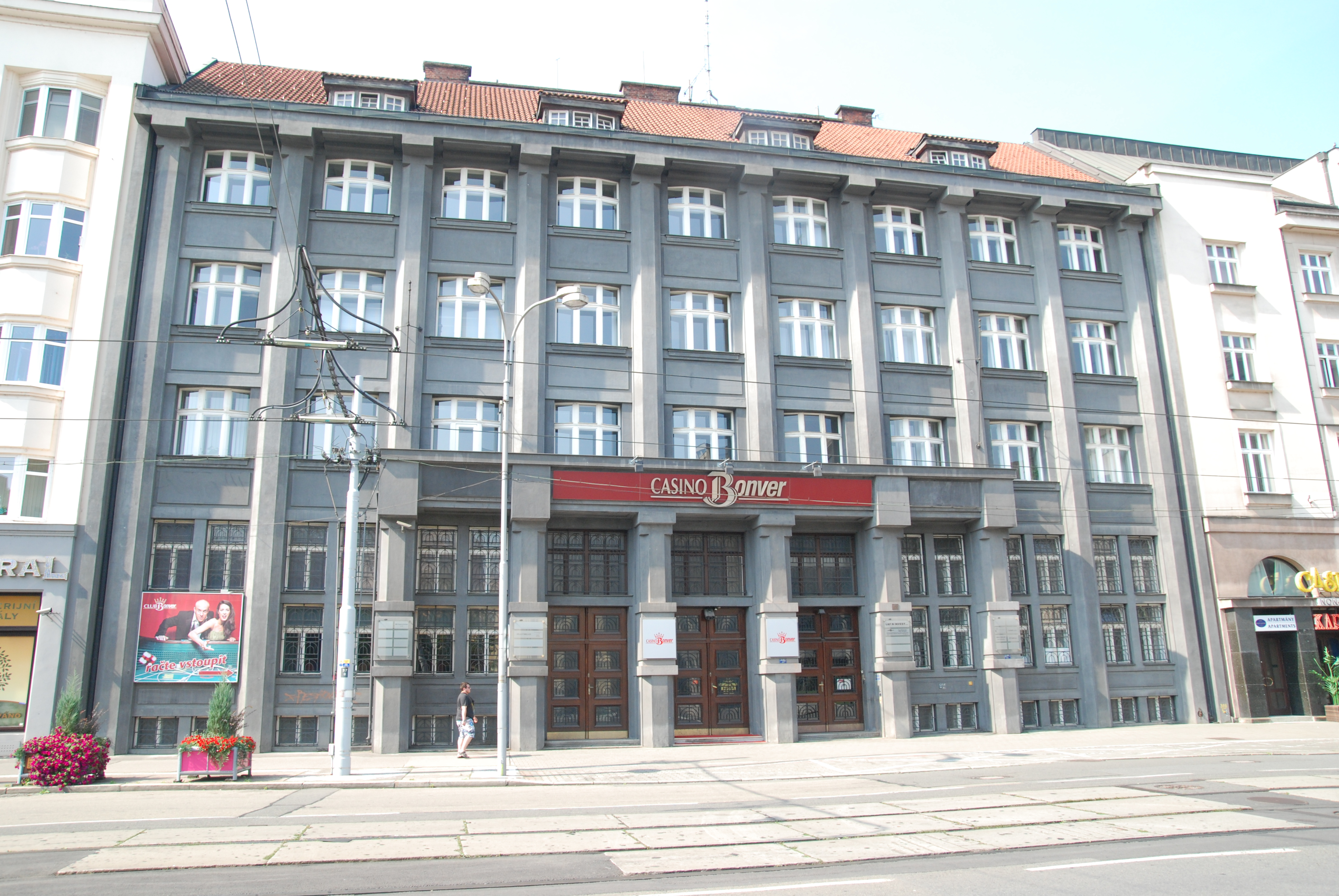
Former branch in Ostrava, designed by Gočár

== Prague Credit Bank ==
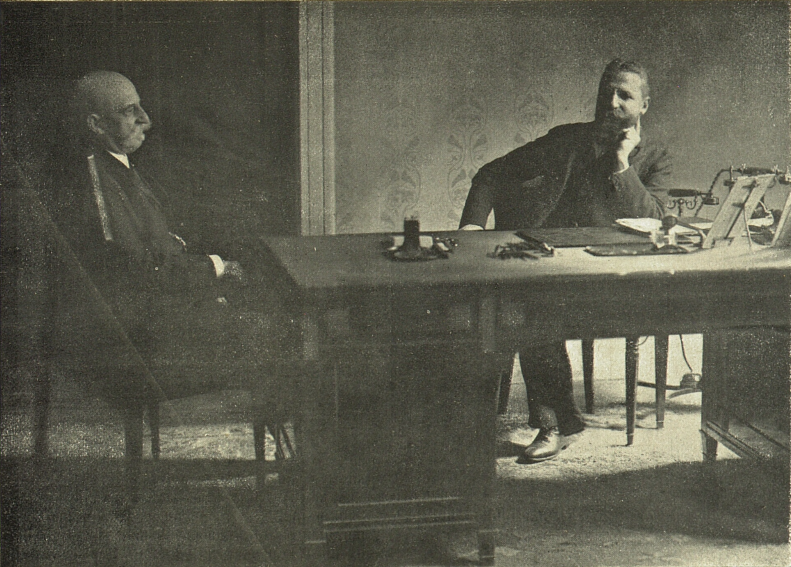
The Prague Credit Bank's long-standing general manager Julius Veselý and his colleague Eduard Kramer, 1904

The Prague Credit Bank was established in 1870 in Kolín, chaired by prominent businessman František Havelec until his death in 1879. It opened a branch in Prague in 1896, and relocated there in 1899. In 1900-1902, it built a new head office in Prague, 28. října 13, one of the earliest examples of Art Nouveau in Prague, on a design by architect Matěj Blecha and sculpture by Celda Klouček. The Prague Credit Bank opened a branch in Lviv in 1906 then expanded outside of Austria-Hungary, with a branch in Belgrade in 1910 and another one in Sofia in 1912. In 1919, it was shored up by a group of investors led by France's Société Générale. In 1920 it took a majority stake in the Romanian Trade and Industry Bank (Romanian: Banca Română de Comerț și Industrie) in Bucharest; conversely, in 1921 it liquidated its branches in former Austrian Galicia. Its operations in Yugoslavia were similarly liquidated in 1924, with assets taken over by the National Bank of the Kingdom of Yugoslavia.

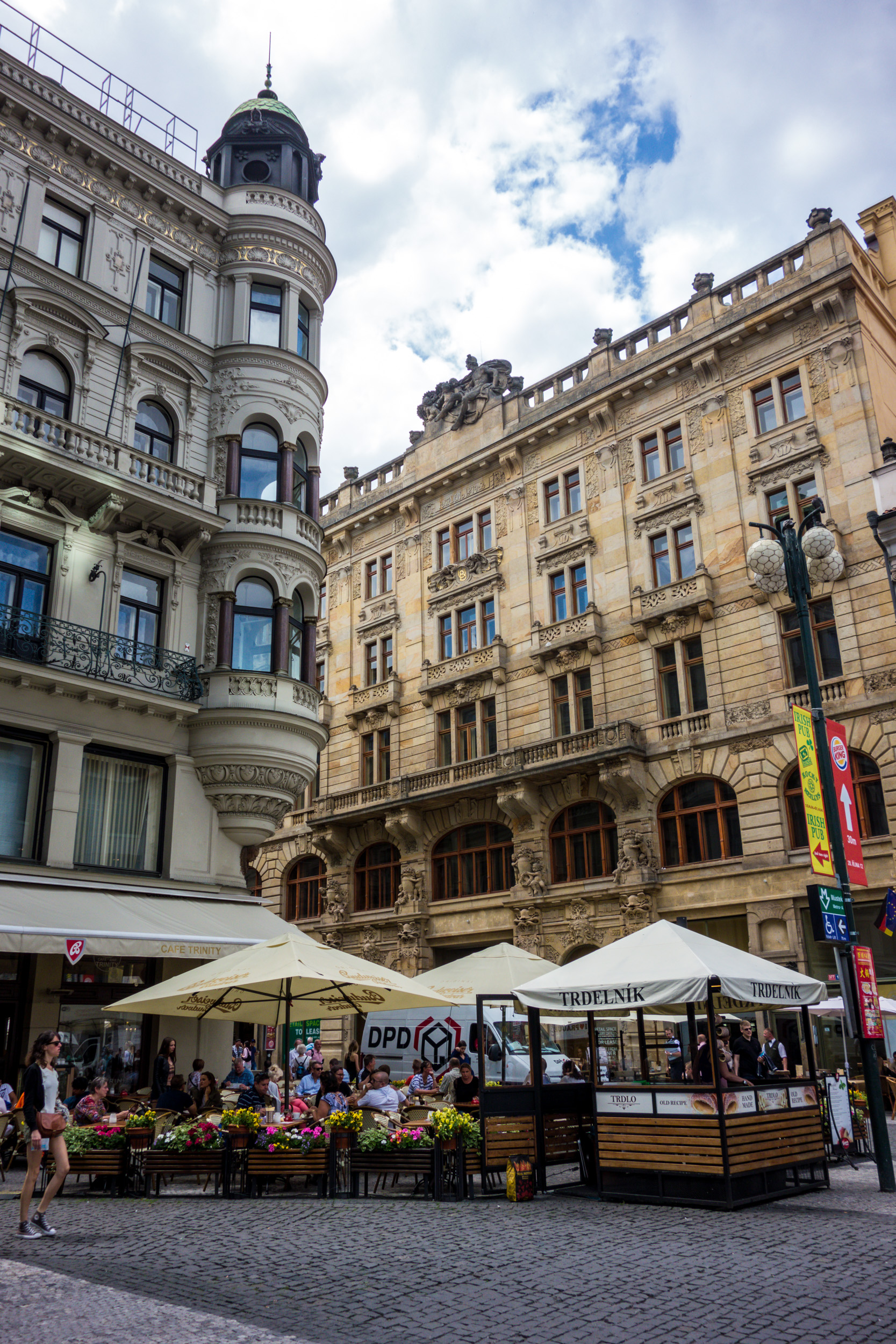
Former head office (right)

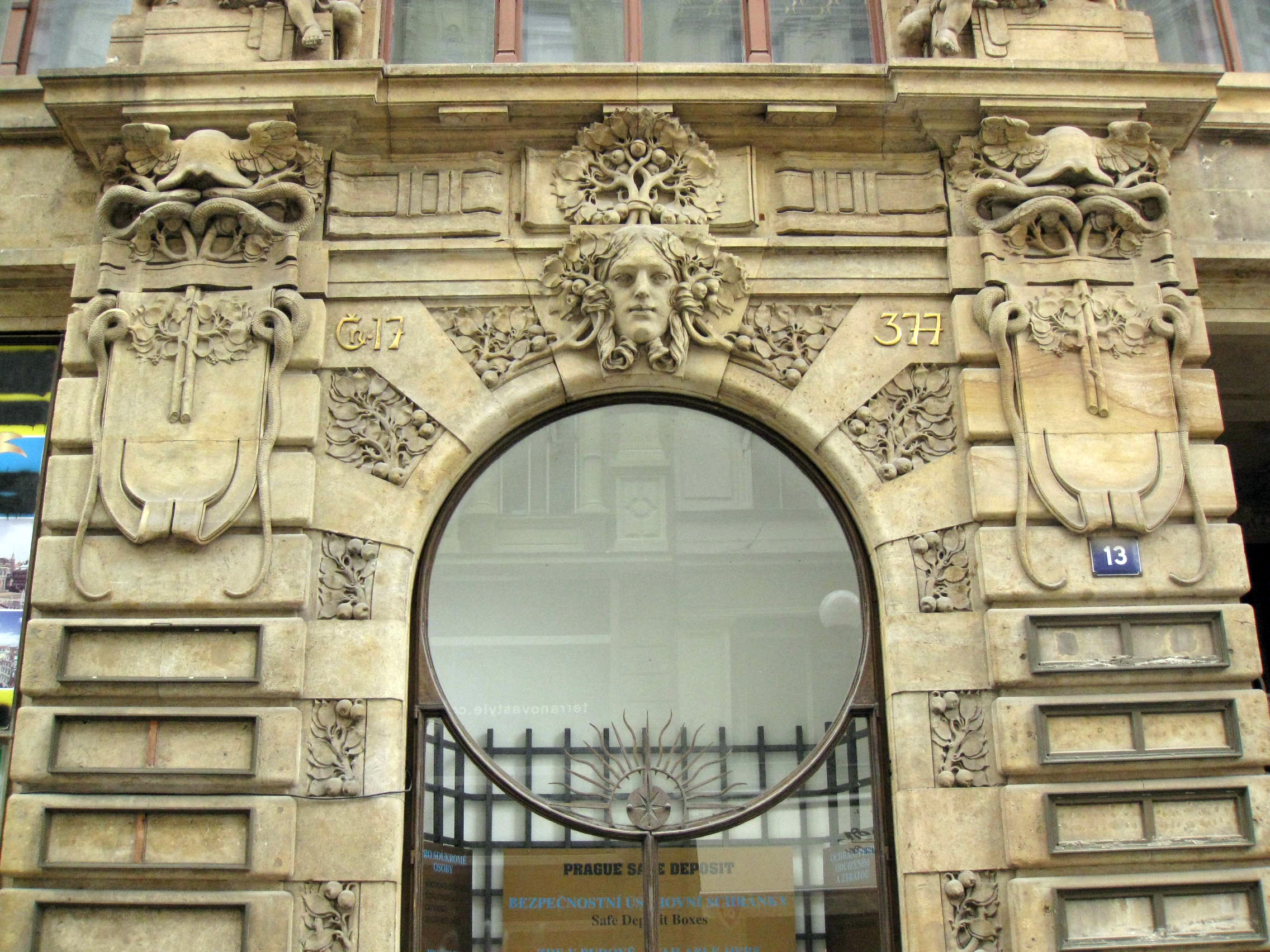
Detail of decoration

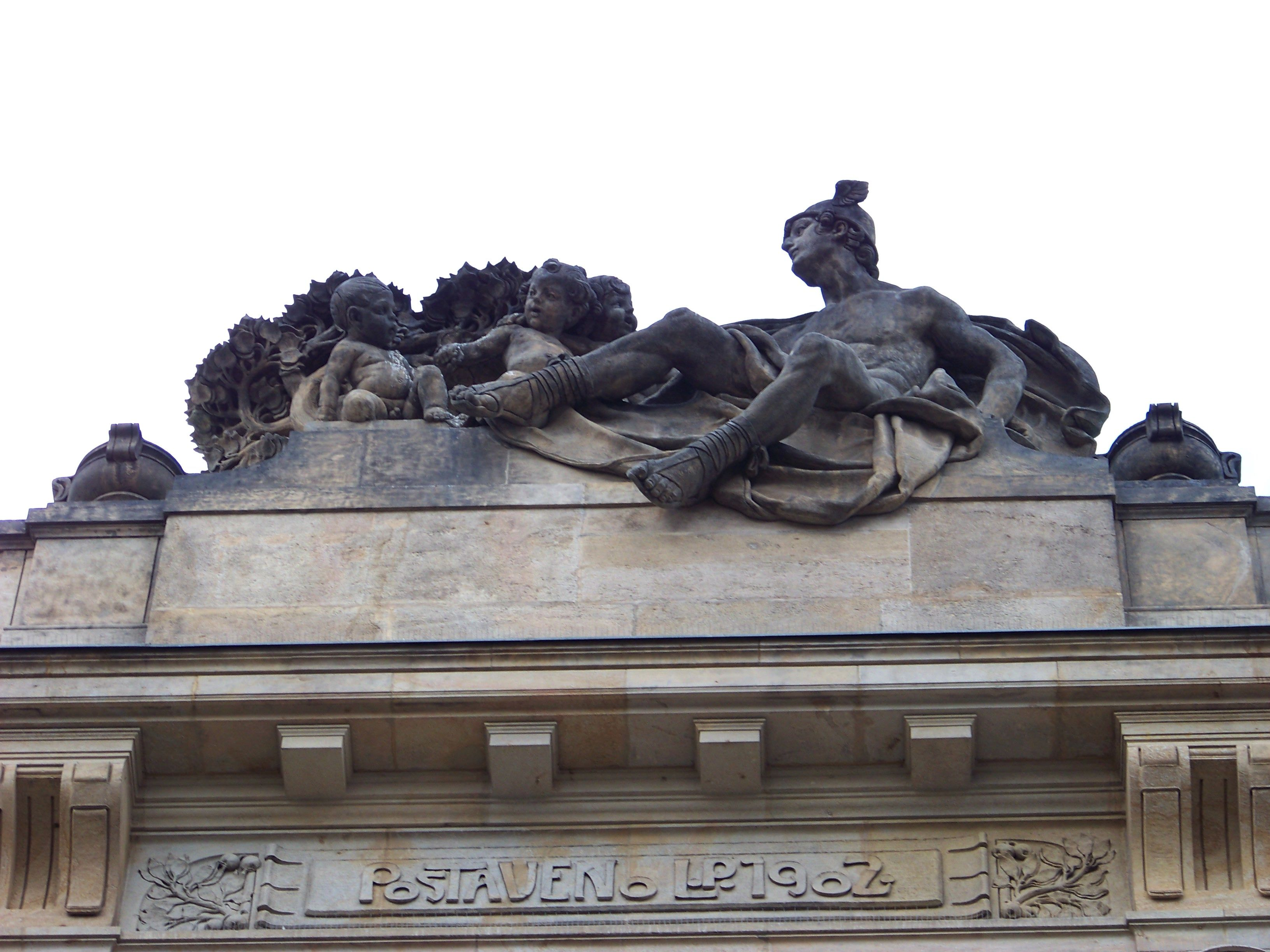
Crowing sculpture of Hermes

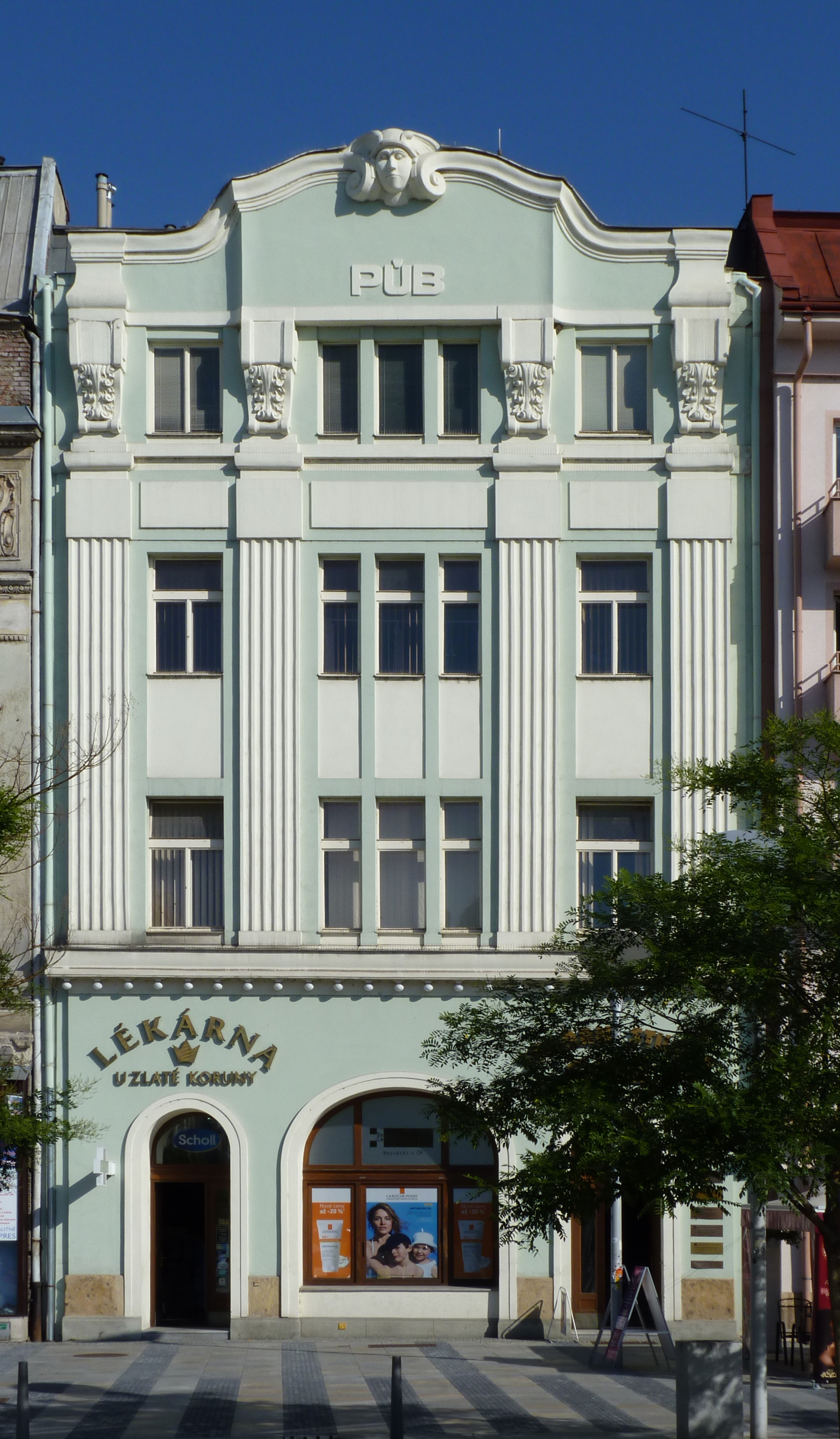
Former branch in Ostrava, with preserved monogram PÚB

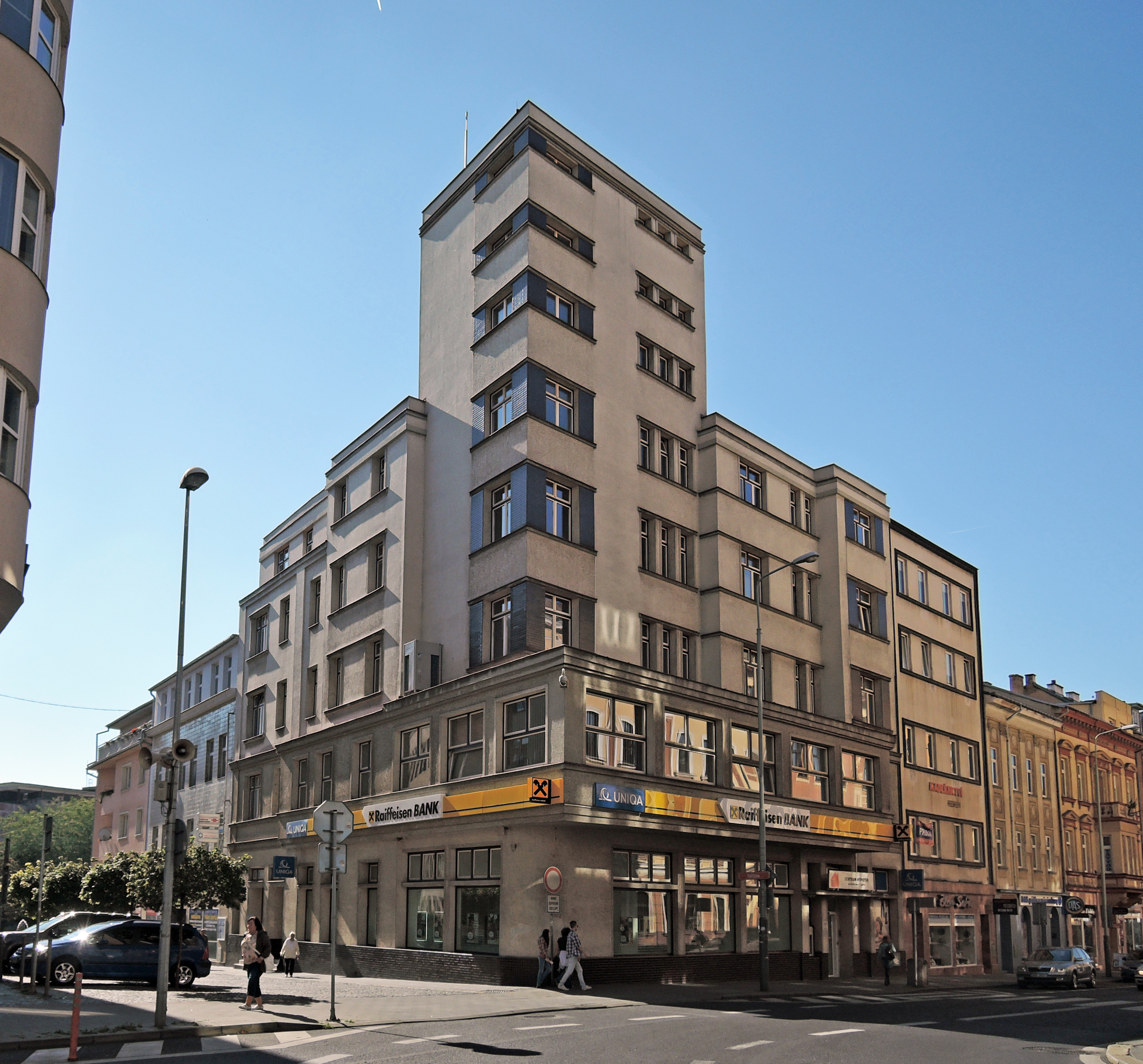
Former branch in Ústí nad Labem

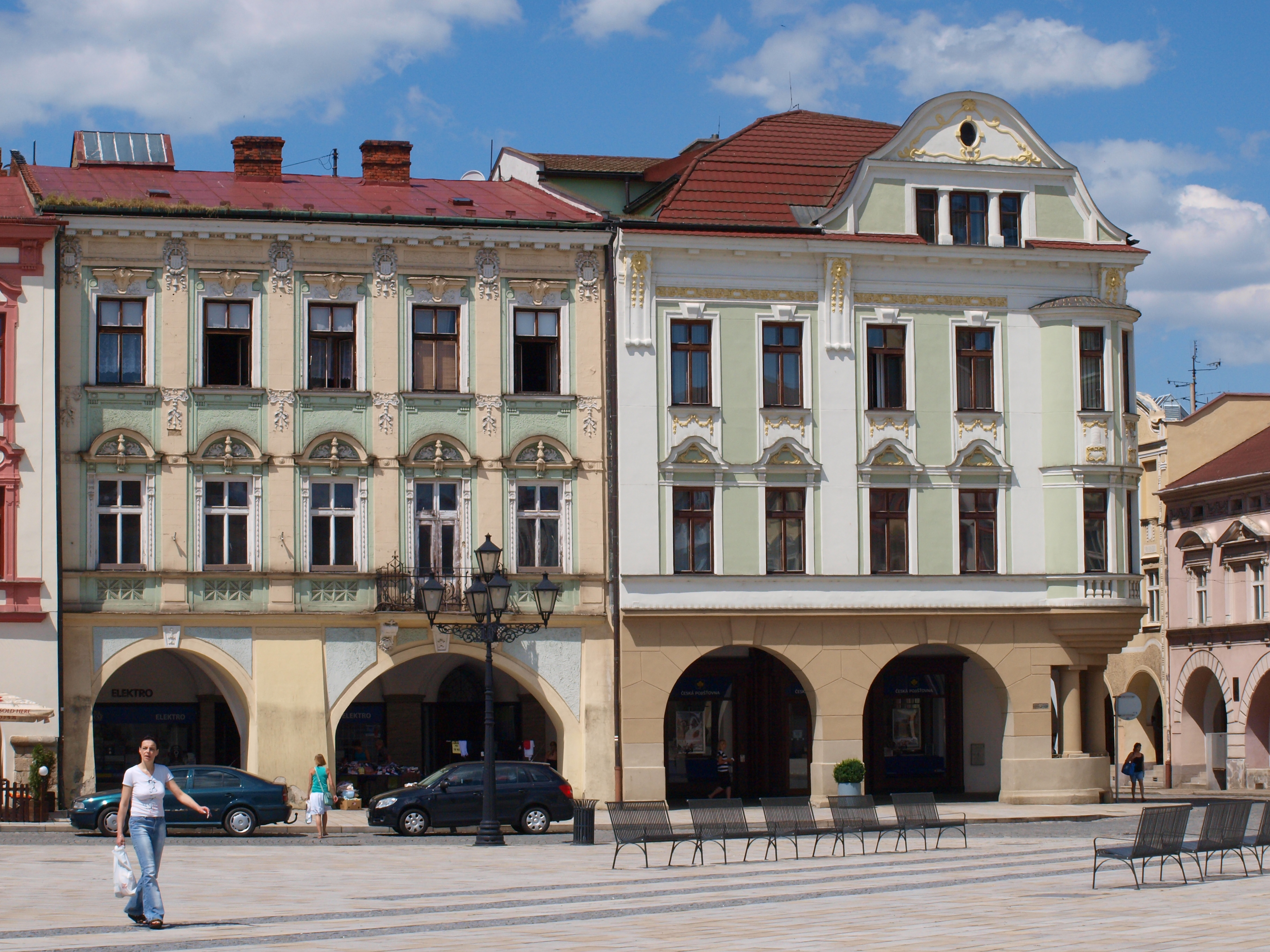
Former branch in Nový Jičín (right)

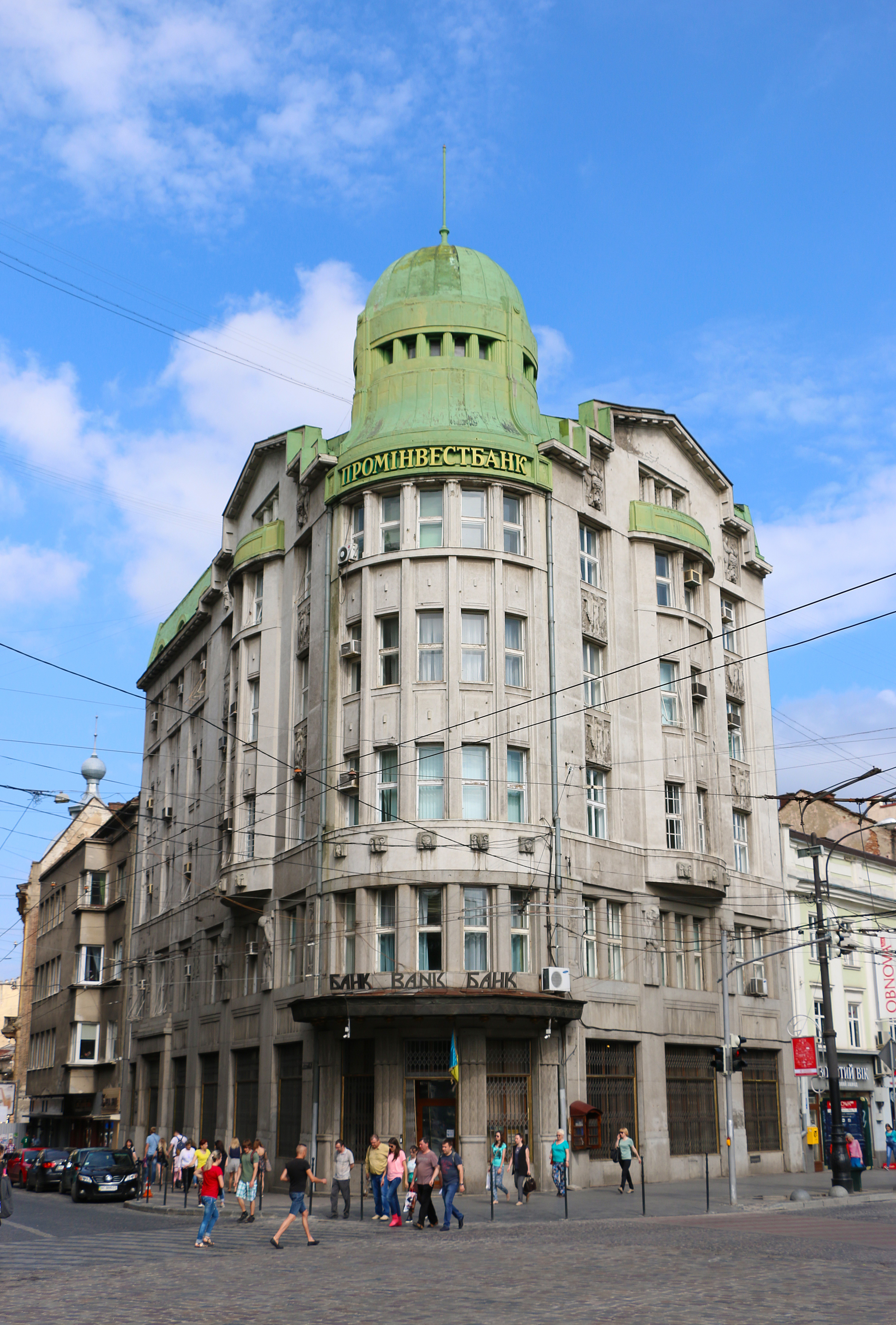
Former branch in Lviv

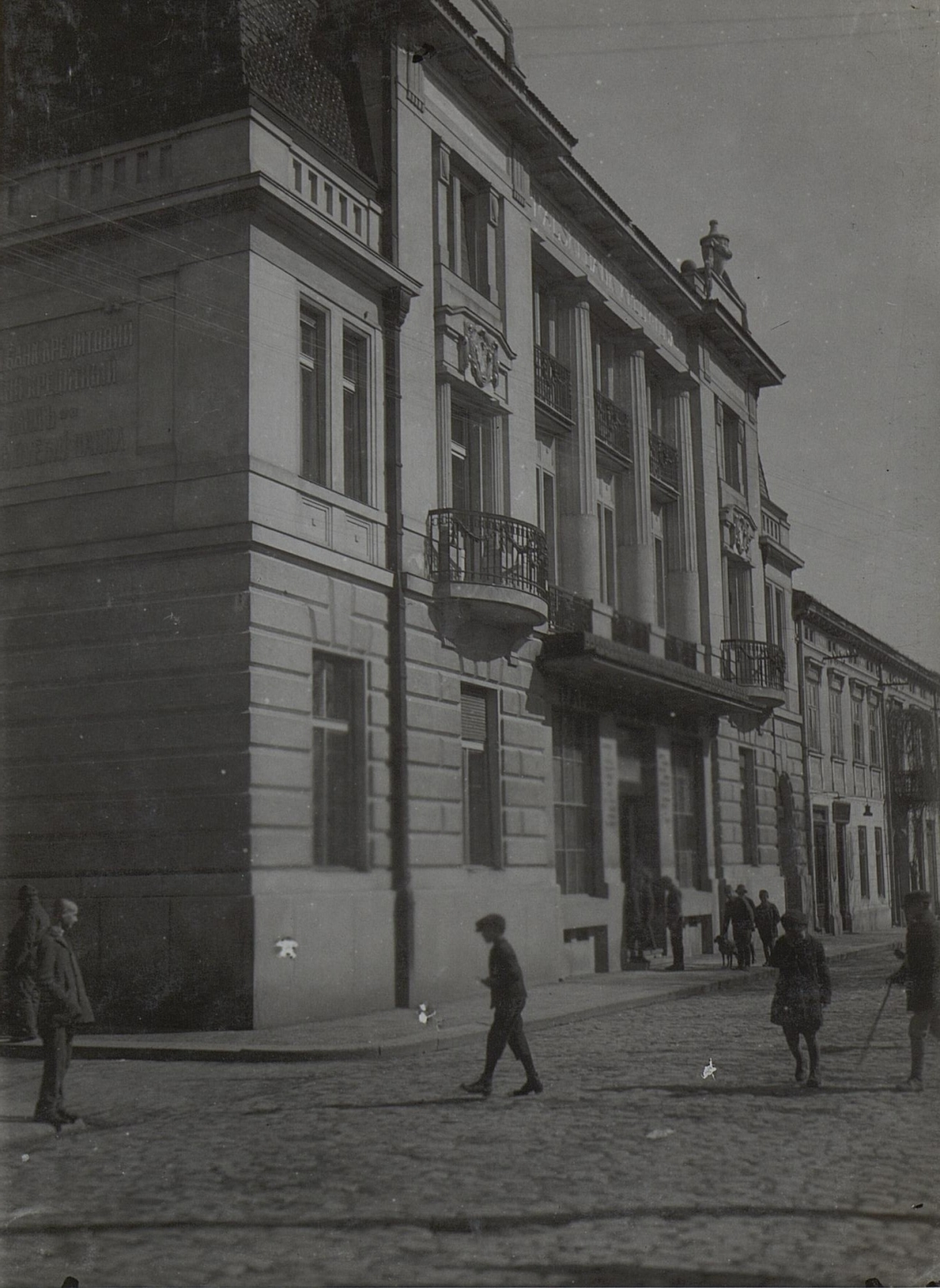
Branch in Brody, during World War I

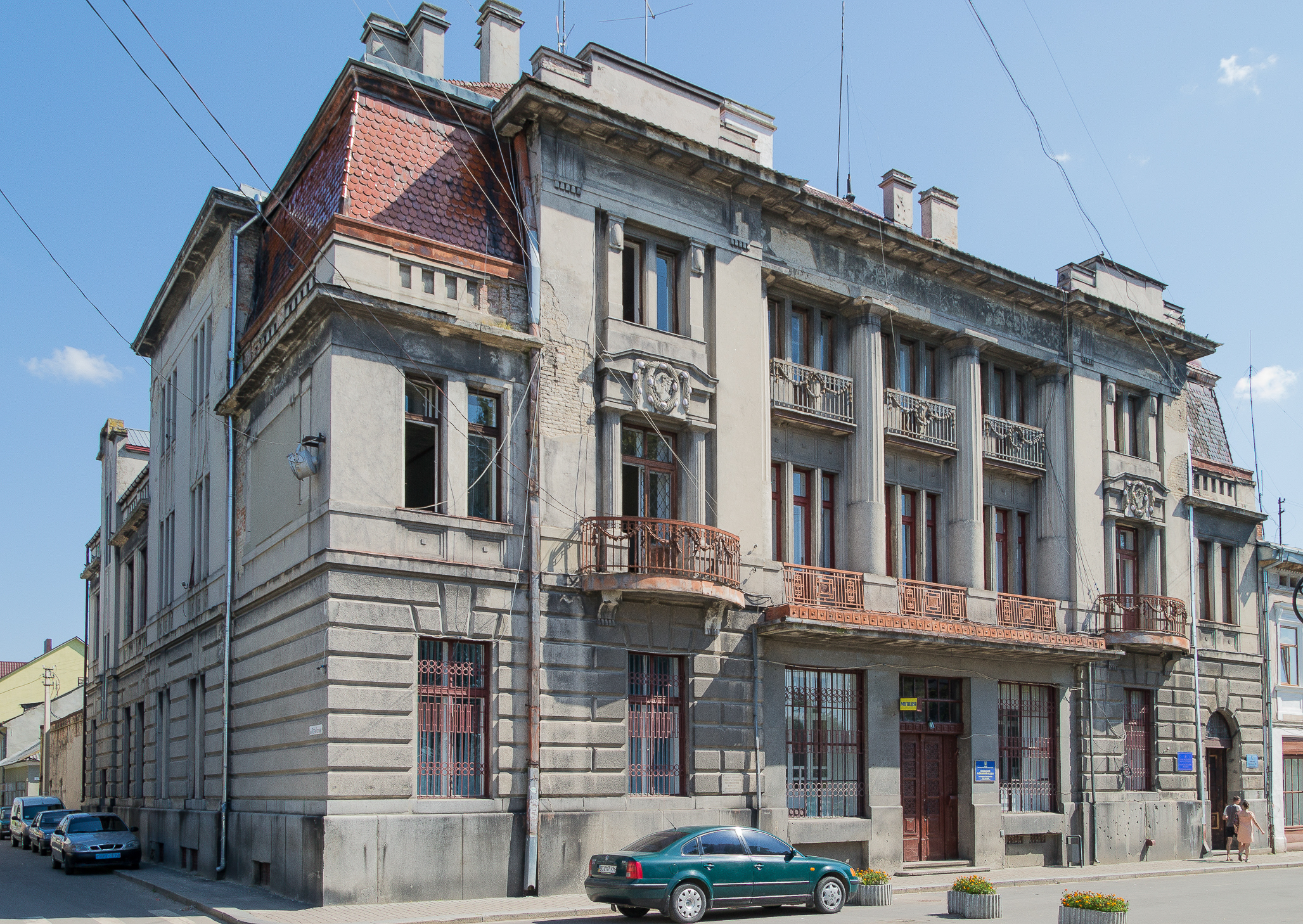
The same building in 2013

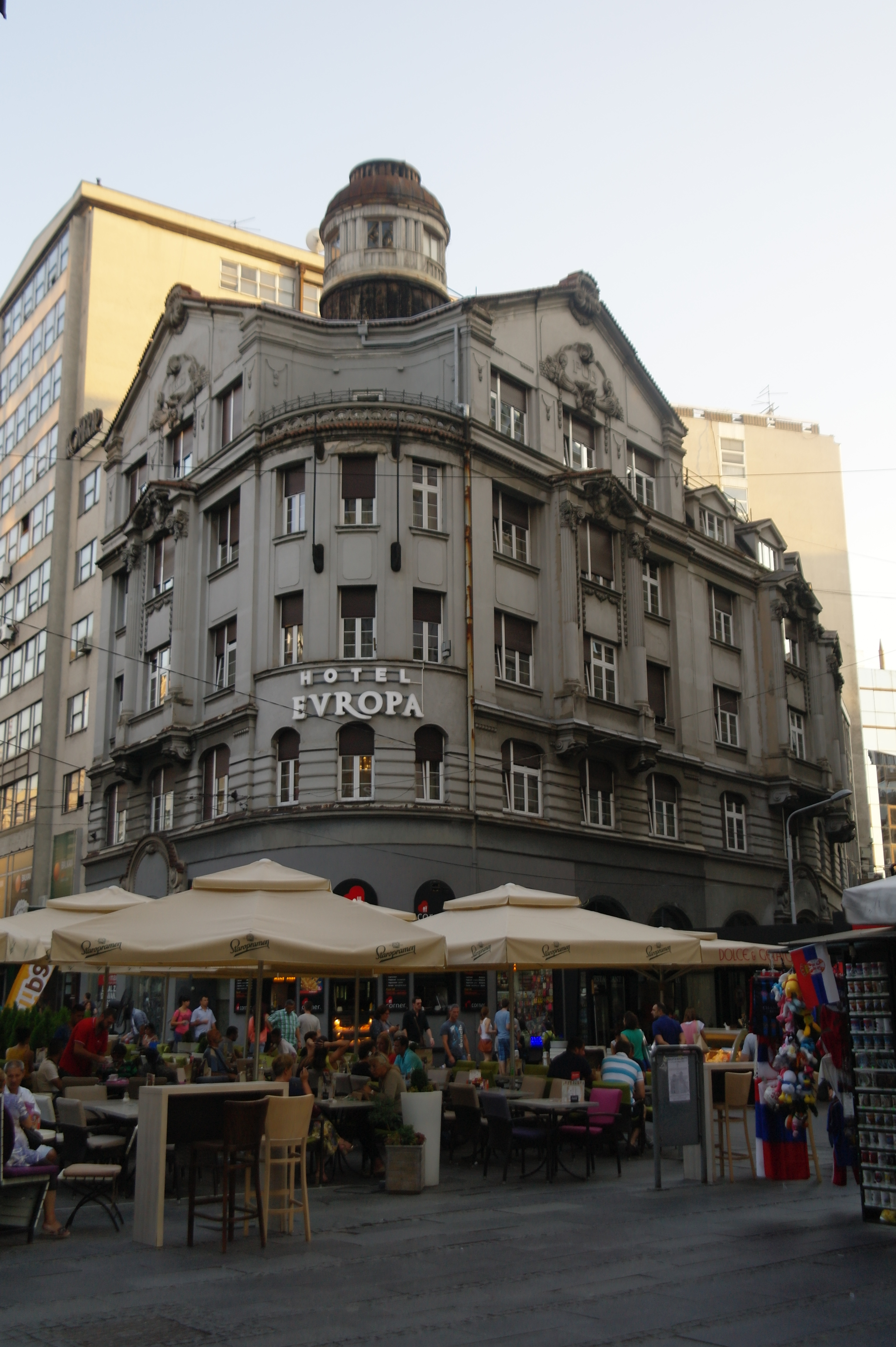
Former branch in Belgrade

== Czech Commercial Bank ==
The Czech Commercial Bank was created in 1921 from the nostrification of the operations of Vienna-based Mercurbank in Czechoslovakia. It suffered heavy losses in the turmoil of the early 1920s. Given the bank's lingering fragility in the late 1920s, its directors welcomed the prospect of merger.

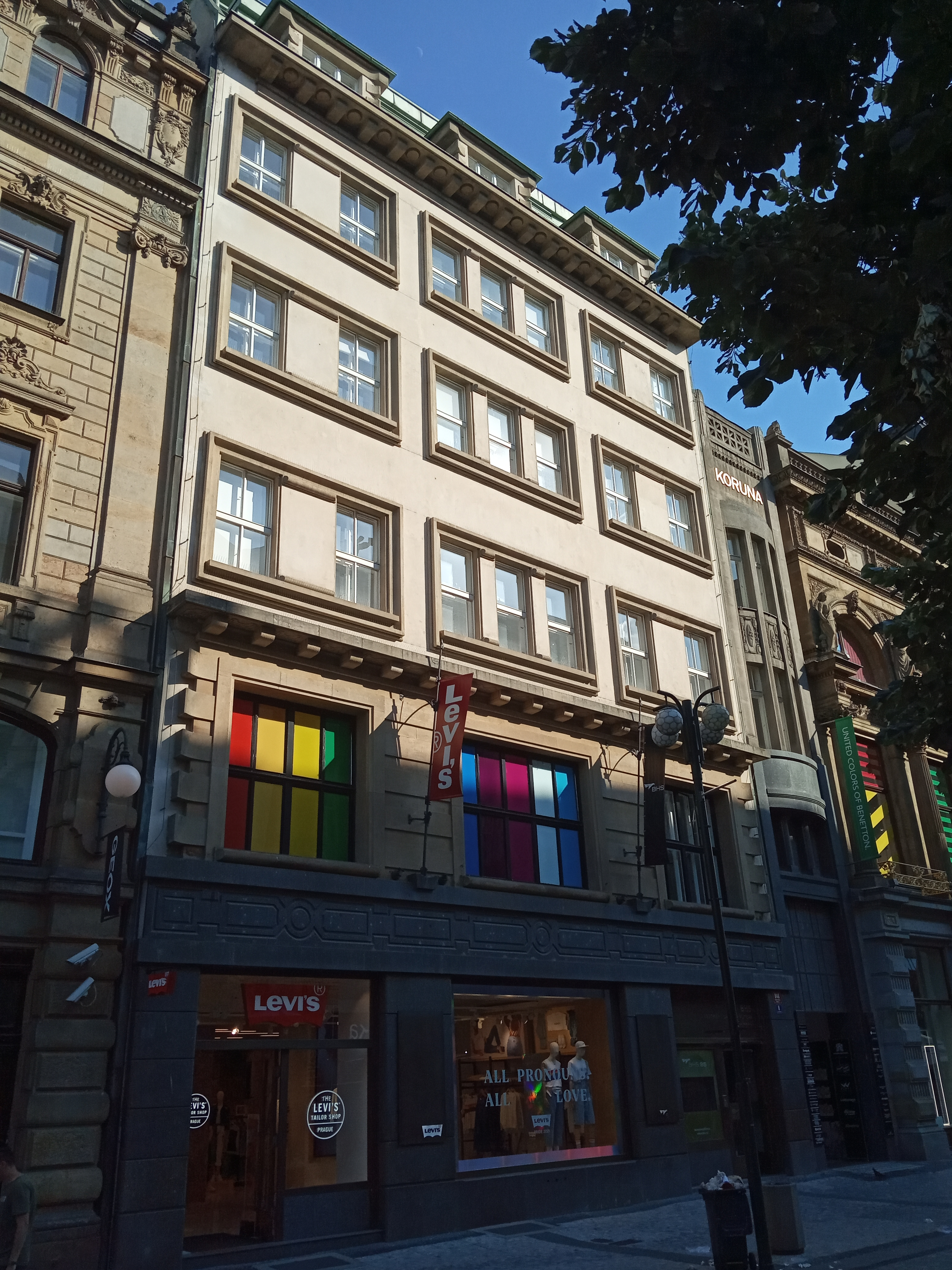
Former head office of Czech Commercial Bank, Na příkopě 6

== Merger and aftermath ==
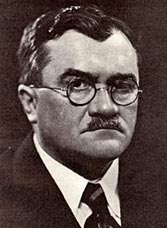
Karel Engliš (1880-1961) engineered the merger of the three banks in 1929-1930

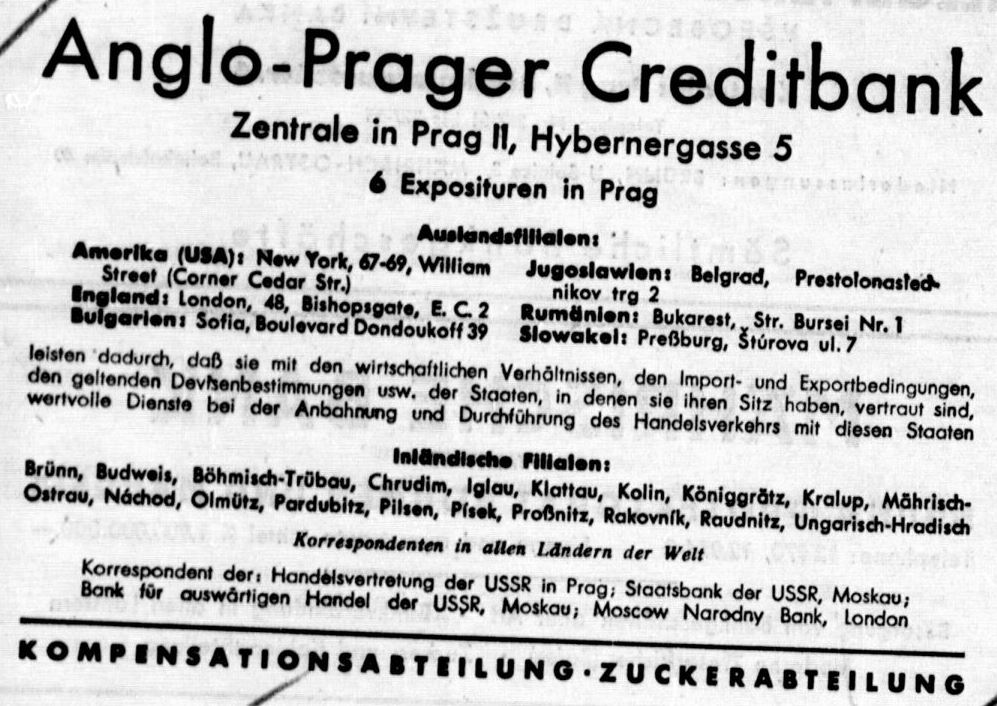
Advert of the Anglo-Prague Credit Bank, June 1940

In 1929, finance minister Karel Engliš, aiming to counter the dominance of Živnostenská banka, engineered the merger of the three banks to form the Anglo-Czechoslovak and Prague Credit Bank, which became the country's second-largest bank. The new bank established its head office in the former headquarters of Anglo-Czechoslovak Bank, which was the larger of the three, at Hybernská 5 in Prague. In 1939, it opened a branch in New York.

In late 1938, the bank ceded its operations in the annexed Sudetenland to the Allgemeine Deutsche Credit-Anstalt. Following Nazi invasion, it was again renamed in 1939 as Anglo-Prague Credit Bank, then in August 1940 back as Prague Credit Bank. By then, it maintained international branches in Belgrade, Bratislava, Bucharest, London, New York, Paris, and Sofia, as well as in 20 locations in Bohemia-Moravia. It took over the Meatpackers and Sausage-Makers Bank (Czech: Řeznicko-uzenářska banka v Praze, German: Fleischer- und Selcher Bank in Prag, est. 1921) in December 1941, then the Czech Discount Bank (Czech: Česká diskontní banka v Praze, est. 1920 as Československá družstevní banka) in early 1943. Its own activity was discontinued in December 1943 and taken over by German financial institutions. In May 1945, the bank restarted operations shortly after the completion of the Prague offensive. Like all Czechoslovak banks, it was nationalized in 1946 under the Beneš decrees. It was finally subsumed in 1948 into Živnostenská banka. Its branch in New York was transferred to Živnostenská banka but eventually closed in 1949.

== See also ==
- Anglo-Austrian Bank
- Anglo-Egyptian Bank
- Anglo-Portuguese Bank
- Anglo-South American Bank
- List of banks in the Czech Republic
