= Julius Petschek =

- Born: 14 March 1856; Kolín
- Died: 22 January 1932 (aged 75); Prague
- Resting place: New Jewish Cemetery in Prague
- Relatives: Isidor Petschek (brother); Frank C. Petschek (nephew); Otto Petschek (nephew); Bridget Gellert Lyons (granddaughter)

Julius Petschek (14 March 1856 – 22 January 1932) was an industrialist of Jewish origin in Austria-Hungary and later in Czechoslovakia. Together with his brother Ignaz, he was one of the wealthiest persons of interwar Czechoslovakia.

== Early life ==
Petschek was born in Kolín. He was a younger son of Moses Petschek (1822–1888) and Sara (née Wiener) Petschek (1827–1894). He had a sister, Rosa Petschek (1855–1934), and two brothers, Isidor Petschek (1854–1919), father of Otto Petschek, and Ignaz Petschek (1857–1934), father of Frank C. Petschek.

== Career ==
He and his brothers Isidor and Ignaz played an important role in the coal industry of the young Czechoslovakia. Their concern controlled also 30% of the German and in total almost 50% of the European brown coal mining industry in the years after World War I.

In 1920 Ignaz founded the Petschek Brothers Bank (Bankhaus Petschek & Co.) in Prague that was directed by 6 family members including Julius. After he died in 1932 his son Walter and Isador's son Hans ran the company until 1938 when they moved to New York as a consequence of the Munich Agreement. Julius is known for commissioning the bank's Petschek Palace in Prague that was used by the Gestapo in World War II.

== Personal life ==
Julius Petschek died in Prague on 22 January 1932 and is buried at the New Jewish Cemetery.
