= Bridget Gellert Lyons =

American literary scholar

- Born: Bridget Juliette Gellert; August 28, 1932; Prague, Czechoslovakia
- Died: May 8, 2023 (age 90); United States
- Occupations: Literary scholar, college professor
- Notable work: Voices of Melancholy (1971)
- Relatives: Julius Petschek (grandfather)

Bridget Juliette Gellert Lyons (August 28, 1932 – May 8, 2023) was a Czech-born American Shakespeare scholar and college professor. She was a professor at Rutgers University from 1965 to 2003. At Rutgers, she was chair of the English department, and dean of humanities in the School of Arts and Sciences.

== Early life and education ==
Gellert was born in Prague, the daughter of Leopold R. Gellert and Marianne (Mitzi) Petschek-Gellert. Her family fled Europe in the 1930s, and she lived in England and Cuba as a girl, before moving to Rye, New York, where her mother died in 1950. Her father was an investment banker. Her maternal grandfather, Julius Petschek, was a wealthy industrialist from a prominent Jewish family in Prague. She graduated from Radcliffe College in 1954, and earned a master's degree at the University of Oxford in 1956. She completed doctoral studies at Columbia University in 1967. Her dissertation was titled "Three Literary Treatments of Melancholy: Marston, Shakespeare and Burton".

== Career ==
Gellert Lyons studied English Renaissance literature, and taught at Rutgers University from 1965 until 2003. Her undergraduate course on Shakespeare enrolled hundreds of students every year. She was chair of the English department, director of graduate studies, and dean of humanities in the School of Arts and Sciences. She was editor of the journal Renaissance Quarterly. Gellert Lyons retired from Rutgers in 2003, and endowed a scholarship there with her husband in 2012, for graduate students in Renaissance studies.

== Publications ==
- "The Melancholy of Moor-Ditch: A Gloss of 1 Henry IV, I. ii. 87-88" (1967)
- "The Iconography of Melancholy in the Graveyard Scene of 'Hamlet'" (1970)
- Voices of Melancholy: Studies in Literary Treatments of Melancholy in Renaissance England (1971)
- "The Subplot as Simplification in King Lear" (1974)
- "The Iconography of Ophelia" (1977)
- "'Kings Games': Stage Imagery and Political Symbolism in Richard III" (1978)
- Chimes at Midnight (1988)
- Reading in an Age of Theory (1997, editor)

== Personal life ==
Gellert married fellow professor Robert B. Lyons in 1971. She died in 2023, at the age of 90.
