= Lenka Reinerová =

Czech writer

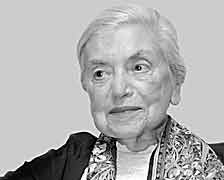
Reinerová in 2003

Lenka Reinerová (Czech pronunciation: [ˈlɛŋka ˈrajnɛrovaː]; 17 May 1916 – 27 June 2008) was a Czech writer of German and Jewish origin. She wrote exclusively in German. She was born in Prague.

== Life ==
Reinerová was born on 17 May 1916 in Karlín (now a district of Prague). She grew up in a German-speaking Jewish family, her mother a German-Bohemian from Žatec and her father an ironware dealer from Prague. Prior to World War II, she worked as a translator, an interpreter and an editor for the Arbeiter-Illustrierte-Zeitung. She fled to Paris in 1939 but after the beginning of the Second World War she was arrested and then interned in the camp of Rieucros in Southern France. She finally could leave the camp and reached Mexico at the end of 1941 where she stayed during the whole war. Among her companions during her exile in Mexico there were the communist and writer Egon Erwin Kisch. Both wrote for the German-language anti-fascist newspaper Freies Deutschland. She was the only member of her family to survive the Holocaust. In 1943, she married a fellow European Jewish exile, the writer and medical doctor Theodor Balk (pseudonym of Dragutin Fodor); the couple, who met in Prague before the war, moved to Belgrade after the war, where they had a daughter Anna.

The couple returned to Czechoslovakia after 1948. In the 1950s, Reinerová was jailed by Czechoslovak communist authorities and spent 15 months in prison; she recorded this experience in one of her novels, Alle Farben der Sonne und der Nacht. After her release she published sporadically. In 1958, she became the Editor of the German language publication 'Im Herzen Europas' (In the Heart of Europe) published by the Orbis Publishing House in Prague; in October 1968 she became the Editor in Chief. From the summer of 1968, and throughout the period following the Warsaw Pact invasion, Im Herzen Europas continued to support the Action Programme of the Communist Party. She remained as Editor in Chief until at least the end of 1969. Later she was not allowed to publish at all until the fall of communism, but in 1983 she began publishing some short stories at Aufbau Verlagsgruppe in East-Berlin. Since then, her works are still published at Aufbau. In 2004, she cofounded a cultural institution for German-language writing in the greater Czech region, the Prager Literaturhaus deutschsprachiger Autoren, with František Černý und Kurt Krolop.

On 25 January 2008, a speech Reinerová wrote but could not longer deliver personally due to ill health was read in German parliament in the course of an hour of remembrance for the victims of the Third Reich.

Reinerová had been largely a recluse ever since a spell in hospital in 2007, with the cause of her death not immediately known. Reinerová, the oldest living German-language writer in Prague, died on 27 June 2008 in Prague, in her apartment, at 92. Lucie Černhousová, head of Literaturhaus, the Prague publisher of German-language writers, disclosed her death. She was buried at the New Jewish Cemetery in Prague.

== Awards ==
In 1999, she was awarded the Schiller Prize. In 2003, she won the prestigious Goethe Medal.
