= Anglo-Portuguese Bank =

Two banks have borne the name Anglo-Portuguese Bank. The first was a short-lived (1862–1863) bank. The second operated under various names from 1929 to 2004.

== First Anglo-Portuguese Bank ==
The first Anglo-Portuguese Bank in 1863 had merged with the London and Brazilian Bank. Both banks had been founded in 1862.

== Second Anglo-Portuguese Bank ==
The origins of the second Anglo-Portuguese Bank lie in the Banco Nacional Ultramarino (BNU). The BNU, which had been founded in Lisbon in 1864, established a branch in London in 1919. Ten years later, BNU incorporated its branch as the Anglo-Portuguese Colonial and Overseas Bank. (That same year BNU also incorporated its Paris branch as Banque Franco-Portugaise d’Outre-Mer.) In 1955 Anglo-Portuguese Colonial and Overseas Bank changed its name to Anglo-Portuguese Bank.

At some point Sir Isaac Wolfson acquired Anglo-Portuguese. In 1975 Norwich Union acquired the bank and two years later the name changed again, this time to AP Bank. In 1984 Riggs National Bank, of Washington, DC, purchased AP Bank, which became Riggs AP bank in 1987, and then Riggs Bank Europe. In 2004 PNC acquired Riggs, which PNC liquidated the next year.

The Anglo-Portuguese Bank operated in Brazil, Mozambique, India (Goa), Macao, Timor, Cape Verde, Guinea, S.Tome and Principe. As part of BNU, the branch issued banknotes.
