= Bruno Kafka =

Czech politician

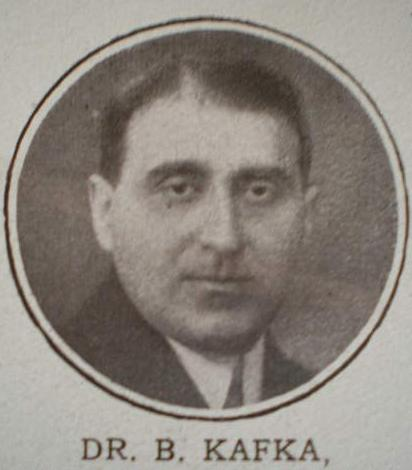
Bruno Kafka Portrait

Bruno Kafka (27 September 1881 – 12 July 1931) was a German-speaking Jewish Czech politician. He was the leader from 1918 to his death of the Czechoslovak German Democratic Liberal Party.

Son of Dr. Moritz Kafka, he was a second cousin of Franz Kafka and the father of Alexandre Kafka. He was a law professor, then dean, then rector of the German University in Prague. He converted to Christianity. During World War I, he became the director of the Prague War Welfare Office and in 1916 the leader of the German Progressive Party, then in 1918 of its inheritor, the German Democratic Liberal Party.

He was elected to the National Assembly in 1920 and in 1929.
