= Petschek Villa =

House in Prague

Coordinates: 50.1003°N 14.4050°E

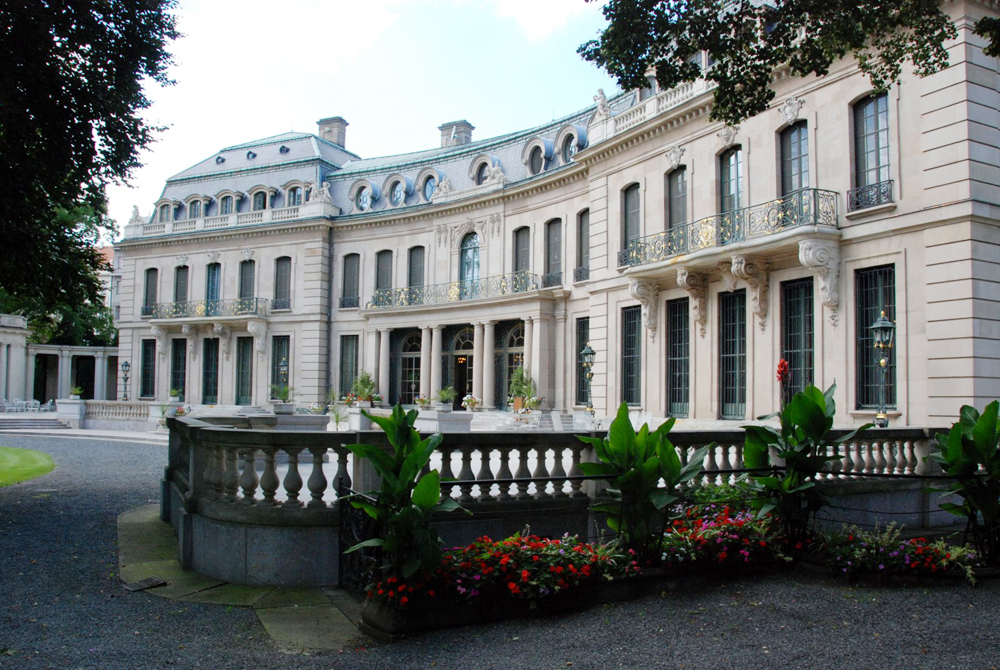
Petschek Villa

The Petschek Villa (Czech: Vila Otto Petschka) is a palatial home built by Otto Petschek in the early 1920s in Prague. Since 1945 it has been the residence of the United States Ambassadors first to Czechoslovakia, and subsequently, to the Czech Republic.

== History ==
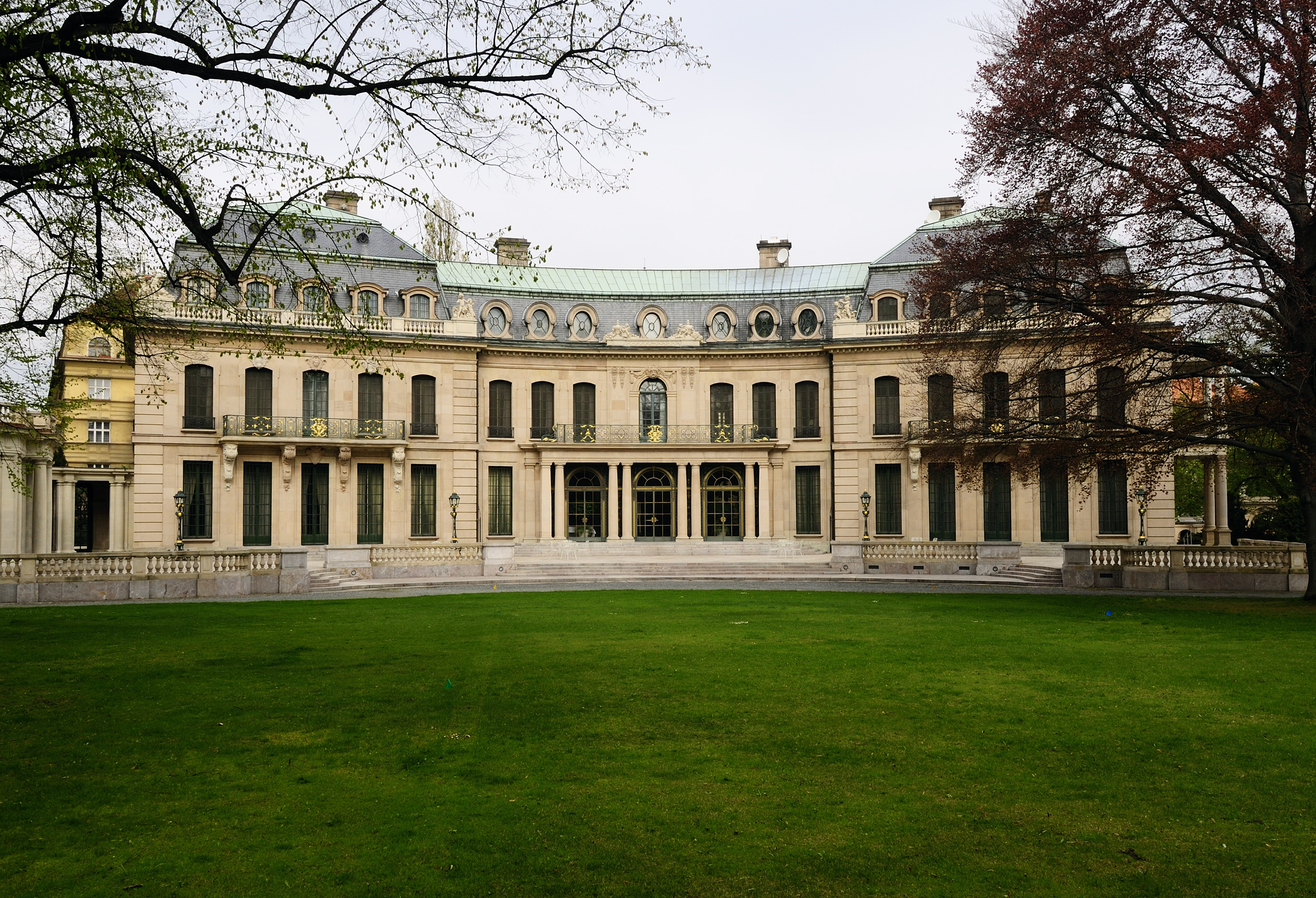
Petschek Villa

The house was built by Otto Petschek, a member of a German-speaking, Jewish family, with financial interests in coal mines and banking. The Petschek family departed Prague in 1938, fearing conquest by Nazi Germany. They immigrated to the United States.

During the German occupation of Czechoslovakia, the Villa became the residence of General Rudolf Toussaint, commander of the German army occupying Czech lands. At the end of the Second World War, the Soviet Army occupied the Residence for several days, after which it became Headquarters for the Czechoslovak General Staff.

In 1945 Laurence Steinhardt, American Ambassador, leased the Residence from the Czechoslovak Ministry of National Defense and it became the American Ambassadorial Residence. In 1948, the American government purchased the Villa, and the adjacent buildings now used as the Deputy Chief of Mission's house, and the Staff-house for $1,570,000.

== Architecture ==
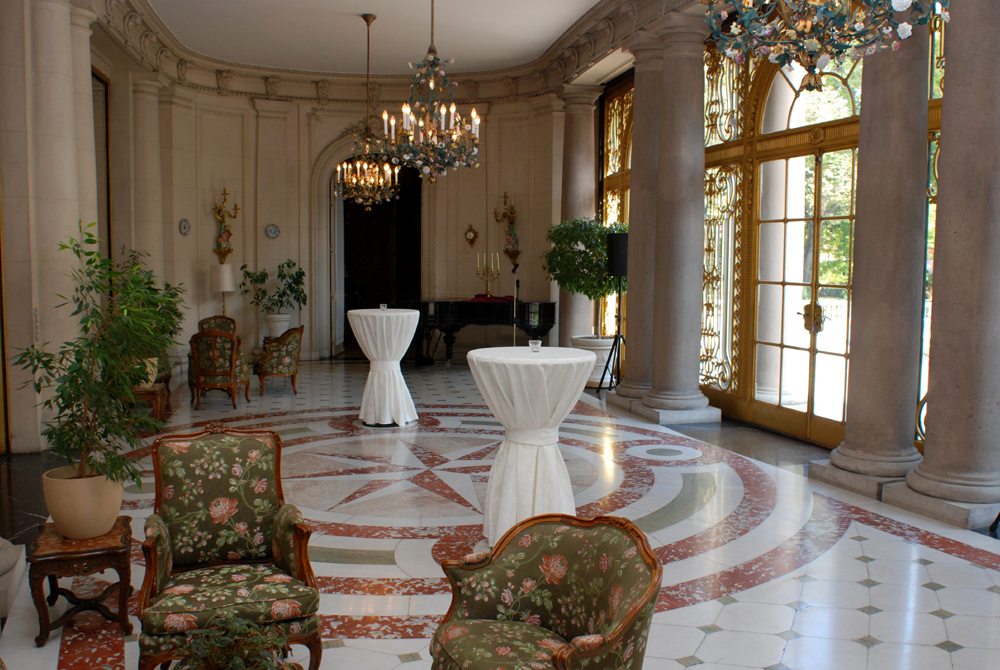
interior view

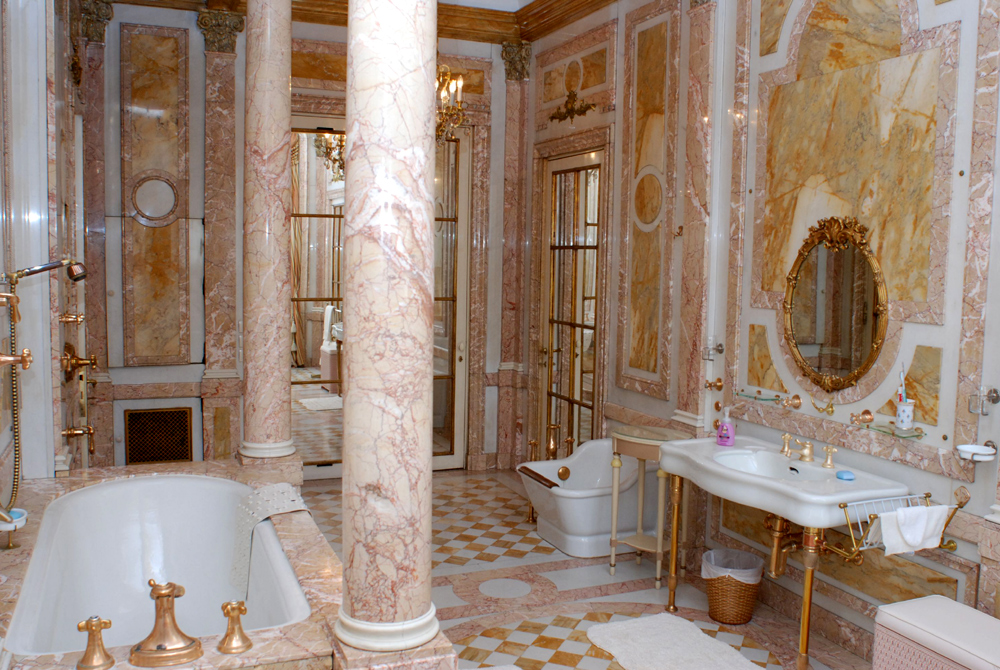
interior view

The Villa was designed by architect Max Spielmann and built by the Matěj Blecha construction company between 1924 and 1930.

== The Last Palace ==
In 2018, Norman L. Eisen, United States Ambassador to the Czech Republic in the Obama administration, published a history of the Villa, The Last Palace: Europe's Turbulent Century in Five Lives and One Legendary House.

== See also ==
- Petschek Palace
