= Alexandre Kafka =

American economist

Alexandre Kafka (January 25, 1917 – November 28, 2007) was an international economist mainly known for his work as an executive director in the International Monetary Fund (IMF).

== Biography ==
Kafka was born in Prague to a family with Jewish heritage in the Austro-Hungarian Empire. His father, Bruno Kafka, was a member of the parliament of Czechoslovakia and a second cousin of author Franz Kafka. He was educated at the University of Prague (now Charles University), the Geneva Graduate Institute, where he attended lectures by Ludwig von Mises, Wilhelm Röpke and Fritz Machlup, and at Balliol College at Oxford University. The invasion of Czechoslovakia by Germany in 1939 pushed his family to emigrate, settling in Brazil in 1940, with Kafka becoming a Brazilian citizen. As Denis Healey, a contemporary at Balliol, would remember in his memoirs: "There were also (in Balliol) a handful of refugees from Central Europe, some of whom had to change their names. One kept his name but changed his nationality. When I was Chancellor of the Exchequer I was astonished to meet my Czech friend, Alex Kafka, as the Brazilian Director of the IMF."

It was in his adoptive country where he began his professional career, by teaching economics at the School of Sociology and Politics in São Paulo. In 1944, he became economic adviser at the Federation of Industries of the State of São Paulo. In 1949, he then moved to Washington, D.C. and joined the staff of the IMF, as Assistant Chief of the Latin American Division in the Research Department. He left after just two years to return to Brazil to organize the Brazilian Institute of Economics at the Getúlio Vargas Foundation in Rio de Janeiro. He later was an adviser to Finance Minister Eugenio Gudin. By this time, he was one of the leading figures in Brazilian economics, known for his intellectual prowess and keen wit, and had developed a worldwide reputation.

In 1956, Kafka moved north again to work at the United Nations in New York. For the next decade he held overlapping appointments at the UN, as a professor at the University of Virginia, and in various posts in Brazil. In July 1966, he went back to the IMF for good, initially as alternate to the executive director for Brazil, Mauricio Chagas Bicalho. In November, he was elected by Brazil, Colombia, the Dominican Republic, Haiti, Panama, and Peru to succeed Mr. Bicalho as executive director. Although he continued to hold adjunct or visiting academic positions at Virginia, Boston University, and The George Washington University all through the 1970s and 1980s, the IMF was his main vocation from then on.

As the representative of an important group of Latin American nations, Kafka faced tough challenges during his more than three decades as executive director, as several of his countries faced balance of payments crises time and again, and went to the IMF for financial assistance recurrently. The relationship between Brazil and the IMF was particularly intense.

However, from the very beginning, Kafka made it clear that he was not going to focus narrowly on relations between his constituency and the Fund. Rather, he was going to speak out for the interests of the developing world and make sure that their voices were heard. In 1966, the Compensatory Financing Facility (CFF) was just beginning to be a major source of financing for commodity-exporting countries. Some of his earliest interventions aimed to strengthen its role. Throughout his tenure on the Board, he fought to expand the usefulness of the CFF and to prevent it from being reduced to a standard conditional facility. In the 1960s, he helped formulate the special drawing rights (SDR) system in a way that would benefit developing as well as industrial countries. In the 1970s, he was instrumental in the creation and design of the Extended Fund Facility, and he helped build a consensus for the oil facilities of 1974 and 1975. Following the collapse of the Bretton Woods system in the early 1970s, he served as vice-chairman of the Deputies of the Committee of Twenty, the forerunner of the International Monetary and Financial Committee (IMFC). In the 1980s, he stressed the importance of enlarged access to Fund resources, insisted that the international debt crisis could not be solved until the developed countries assumed more responsibility for it, and worked for the creation and expansion of concessional lending facilities for low-income countries. In the 1990s, he continued to advocate systemic solutions to the problems of the developing world, through innovations such as the HIPC Initiative.

Kafka was elected executive director sixteen times, through many major shifts in the balance of political power in Brazil and the other countries in his constituency. For more than three decades, he was a mentor to executive directors and staff and a master at brevity of expression in his interventions. Those who knew him primarily through his economic writing looked up to him as a senior professional colleague and not just as a member of the executive board. Those who worked with him on missions to his countries were impressed with his thoroughness and effectiveness in preparing for and participating in discussions with the authorities, regardless of whether the mission was to Brazil or to any other country in the region.

Alexandre Kafka retired from the IMF in October 1998, after exactly 32 years as executive director. Murilo Portugal, also from Brazil, was elected in his place.

Kafka died on November 28, 2007, in Washington, D.C.

== Publications ==
- The Brazilian Exchange Auction System, The Review of Economics and Statistics, Vol. 38, No. 3 (Aug., 1956), pp. 308–322. JSTOR 1925782
- A New Argument for Protectionism?, The Quarterly Journal of Economics, Vol. 76, No. 1 (Feb., 1962), pp. 163–166. JSTOR 1891136
- The Elasticity of Export Supply, Southern Economic Journal, Vol. 32, No. 3 (Jan., 1966), pp. 352–352. JSTOR 1054879
- The Brazilian Stabilization Program, 1964-6, The Journal of Political Economy, Vol. 75, No. 4, Part 2: Issues in Monetary Research, 1966 (Aug., 1967), pp. 596–631JSTOR 1832170
- International Liquidity: Its Present Relevance to the Less Developed Countries, The American Economic Review, Vol. 58, No. 2, Papers and Proceedings of the Eightieth Annual Meeting of the American Economic Association (May, 1968), pp. 596–603 JSTOR 1831845
- The IMF: The Second Coming?, Essays in International Finance, No. 94. Princeton University, July 1972.
- The International Monetary Fund: Reform Without Reconstruction?, Essays in International Finance, No. 118. Princeton University. October 1976. ISBN 9780608133256.
- The New Exchange Rate Regime and the Developing Countries. The Journal of Finance, Vol. 33, No. 3, Papers and Proceedings of the Thirty-Sixth Annual Meeting American Finance Association, New York City December 28–30, 1977 (Jun., 1978), pp. 795–802 JSTOR 2326475
- Gold and International Monetary Stability, Cato Journal, Vol. 3, No. 1, Spring 1983. Available at: https://web.archive.org/web/20080412062257/https://www.cato.org/pubs/journal/cj3n1/cj3n1-15.pdf
- Governance of the Fund, in The International Monetary and Financial System: Developing-Country Perspectives, ed. by G.K. Helleiner. New York: St. Martin's Press, 1996.
