= Petschek Palace =

Neoclassicist building in Prague, Czech Republic

Coordinates: 50°04′53″N 14°25′52″E

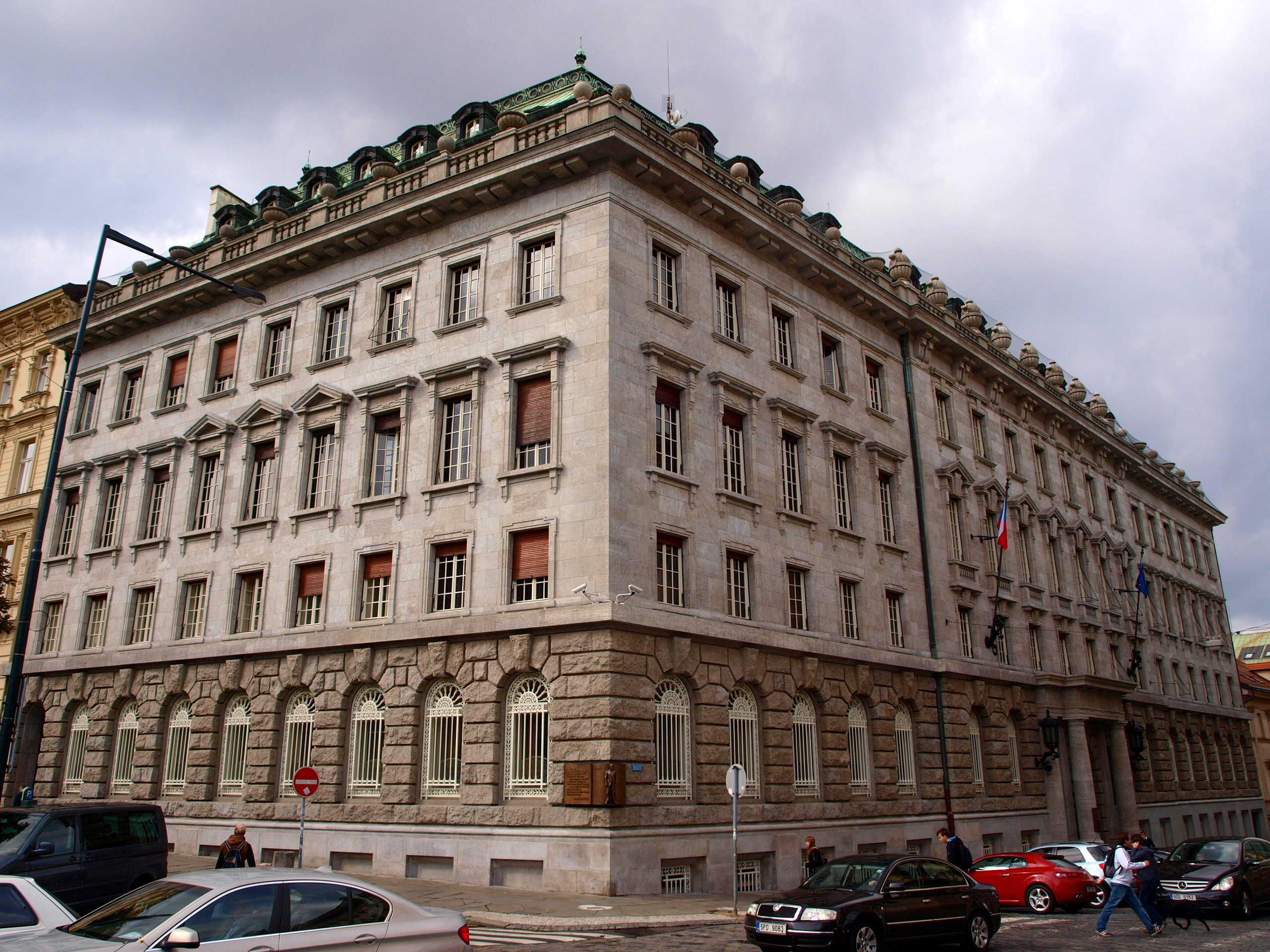
Petschek Palace

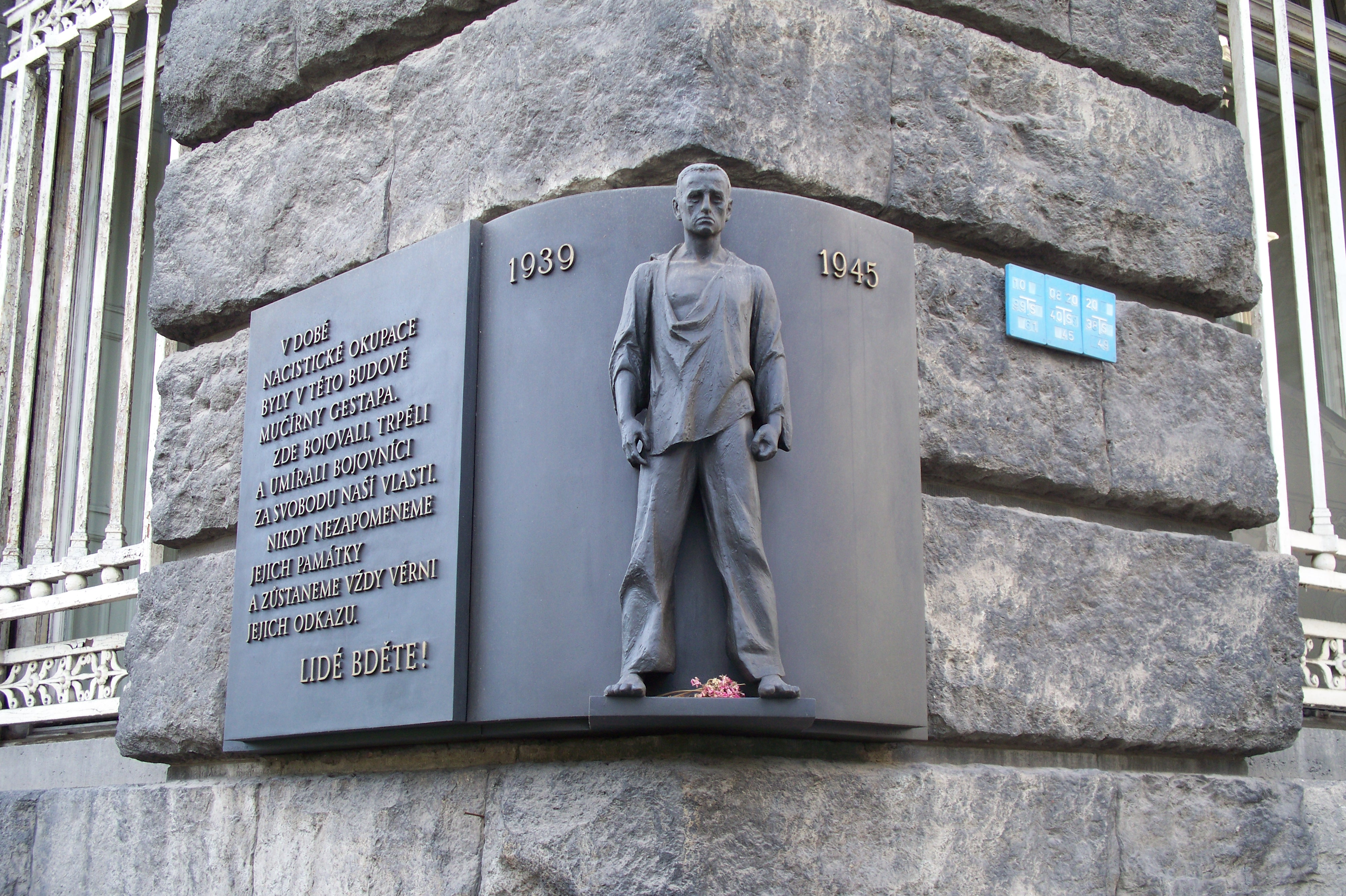
Plaque commemorating the Czech resistance

The Petschek Palace (Czech: Petschkův palác or Pečkárna) is a neoclassicist building in Prague. It was built between 1923 and 1929 by the architect Max Spielmann upon a request from the merchant banker Julius Petschek and was originally called "The Bank House Petschek and Co." (Bankhaus Petschek & Co.) Despite its historicizing look, the building was then a very modern one, being constructed of reinforced concrete and fully air-conditioned. It also had tube post, phone switch-board, printing office, a paternoster lift (which is still functioning), and massive safes in the sublevel floor. The building was sold by the Petschek family before the occupation of Czechoslovakia, and the family left the country.

It was during the war years that the place gained its notoriety, as it immediately became the headquarters of Gestapo for the Protectorate of Bohemia and Moravia. It was here where the interrogations and torturing of the Czech resistance members took place, as well as the courts-martial established by Reinhard Heydrich which sent most of the prisoners to death or to Nazi concentration camps. Many people died as a result of imprisonment and torture in the building itself. A memorial plaque that commemorates the victims was unveiled on the corner of the building.

In 1948 the building was acquired by the then-Czechoslovak Ministry of Foreign Trade. Today it is the residence of a part of the Czech Ministry of Industry and Trade. In 1989 the building became a National Cultural Monument (Národní kulturní památka).

The exterior was used as stand-in for the Gemeinschaft Bank (Zurich, Switzerland) in the 2002 film The Bourne Identity.

== See also ==
- Petschek Villa
