= Frank C. Petschek =

German Bohemian businessman

Frank Conrad Petschek (born Franz Konrad Petschek; December 23, 1894 – June 25, 1963) was a German Bohemian businessman. He was a leading member of the Petschek business dynasty plundered under the Nazis.

== Early life ==
Frank Petschek was born on December 23, 1894, in Ústí nad Labem, Austria-Hungary. He came from an assimilated Jewish home, the sixth of seven children of the industrialist Ignaz Petschek and his wife Helene, née Bloch. The Petschek family was one of the most influential industrialists in Austria-Hungary. Together with his brothers Isidor and Julius, Ignaz Petschek controlled almost 50% of the lignite mining industry in Europe. They also owned numerous shares in banks and in the paper, glass and chemical industries.

At the beginning of the 20th century, Ignaz Petschek parted company with his brothers and acquired considerable shareholdings, especially in the central and eastern German lignite industry, which gave him a dominant position there. Ignaz Petschek's family lived in Ústí nad Labem, but at times also permanently in Berlin.

Besides German, Frank Petschek learned English and French. After the dissolution of Austria-Hungary, Ústí nad Labem was assigned to the newly founded Czechoslovakia in 1918.

== Businesses and positions ==
From the beginning of the 1920s Frank Petschek was trained by his father in the management of the Czechoslovak, Hungarian and Polish family businesses, while his brothers Ernst (1887–1956) and Karl (1890–1960) took over the business of the Ústí nad Labem's Petscheks in Germany and Wilhelm (1896–1980) in Austria and Italy. Among other things, Frank Petschek was appointed to the Board of Directors of Atlantica Trust AG in Budapest (until 1921 Atlantica Seeschifffahrts AG) at the beginning of June 1922. From 1925 at the latest he gave Ústí nad Labem as his permanent residence.

In March 1926, he was elected to the board of directors of Oehringen Bergbau AG, one of the family's largest and most important shareholdings in Upper Silesia. On June 26, 1927, he married Janina Teofila Barcinska (1905–1986), a Jewish woman from Łódź. This was followed in October 1927 by his co-optation to the Board of Directors of the Anglo-Czechoslovak Bank. He held this position until the end of April 1936. He also served on the Board of Directors of Duxer Kohlengesellschaft AG from 1929. From July 1929, he had one of the largest villas in Ústí nad Labem built for himself. He moved into the four-story building with his wife at the end of January 1931.

== Nazi "Aryanization" of the Petschek assets ==
When the Nazis came to power, their antisemitic policies spelled trouble for the Petschek family. Ústí nad Labem had a very small Jewish minority. Most of the inhabitants were ethnic Germans and the city was a stronghold of support for German Nazism. After the death of Ignaz Petschek in 1934 his four sons continued the enterprises of the Ústí nad Labem part of the family largely independently of each other until their expropriation under the Nazis in 1939–1940.

Hermann Göring set up a committee in January 1938 to find ways of quickly "Aryanizing" the Petschek companies.

This commission initially urged "voluntary Aryanization" and declared that expropriation and "Aryanization of commercial enterprises was not desired, but rather a 'transfer' by purchase into Aryan hands." Shares in mines owned in Germany by Ernst Petschek were "sold" to non-Jews.

The following step-by-step expropriation of the "Ignaz Petschek Group" became the largest single object in the history of "Aryanization. By the summer of 1938, with the exception of Frank Petschek, all members of the Petschek clan had left Germany and Czechoslovakia. They initially lived in Switzerland and England, from where the management of all their business in Central Europe was carried out via intermediaries. Subsequently, all of them moved to the US by September 1939.

Frank Petschek left Ústí nad Labem in early September 1938. After the Munich Agreement, the Nazis gained access to the business premises in Ústí nad Labem in October 1938. In November 1938 Frank Petschek fled to Brazil. In 1940 he emigrated to the United States where he became a naturalised citizen. In the US, he changed his first names to Frank Conrad and settled with his wife in New York City where they had two daughters.

In March 1939, Nazi Germany invaded and annexed the Sudetenland region. The assets, business concerns, and property of all family members were transferred to non-Jews by the German authorities in forced sales or confiscated by the Gestapo. In 1942, the Petschek holdings were declared forfeited to the German Reich. The confiscation of the family's holdings would be a major prosecution case in one of the trials of War Criminals during the Nuremberg trials.

== Postwar ==
After 1945, Frank Petschek helped to finance Holocaust studies in America. In 1961, he published Raul Hilberg's 1954 dissertation, The Destruction of the European Jews. Frank Petschek died at the age of 68 in his apartment at 1070 Park Avenue in New York.

== Claims for restitution due to Nazi persecution ==
Frank Petschek appears in the list of cultural property claims in the National Archives. A musical manuscript handwritten by Ludwig van Beethoven was restituted following recognition that the Petschek family had been plundered under the Nazi regime.
