= Wiener Bankverein =

Former bank in Austria

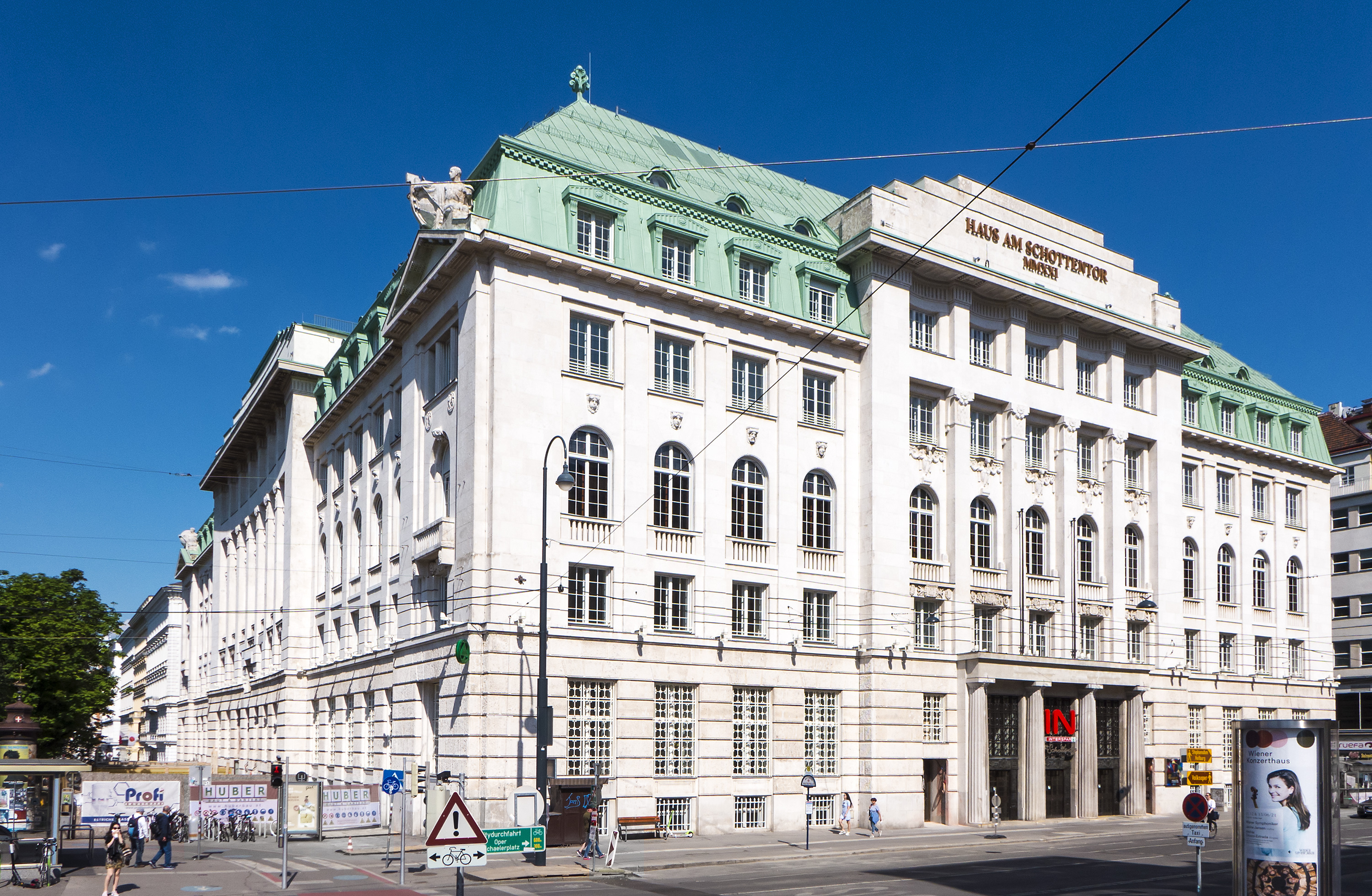
Former head office of Wiener Bankverein at Schottentor in Vienna, 2021

The Wiener Bankverein or Bank-Verein (WBV, lit. 'Viennese Bank Union') was a major bank in the Habsburg Monarchy and the First Austrian Republic, founded in 1869. In 1888 it was the fourth-largest bank of Austria-Hungary by market capitalization, behind the Austro-Hungarian Bank, the Länderbank, and the Creditanstalt. It merged with the troubled Creditanstalt in 1934 to form Creditanstalt-Bankverein. Wiener Bankverein is thus one of the many predecessor entities of UniCredit, as the latter in 2005 acquired Bank Austria which itself had merged with Creditanstalt in 1997.

== Habsburg era ==
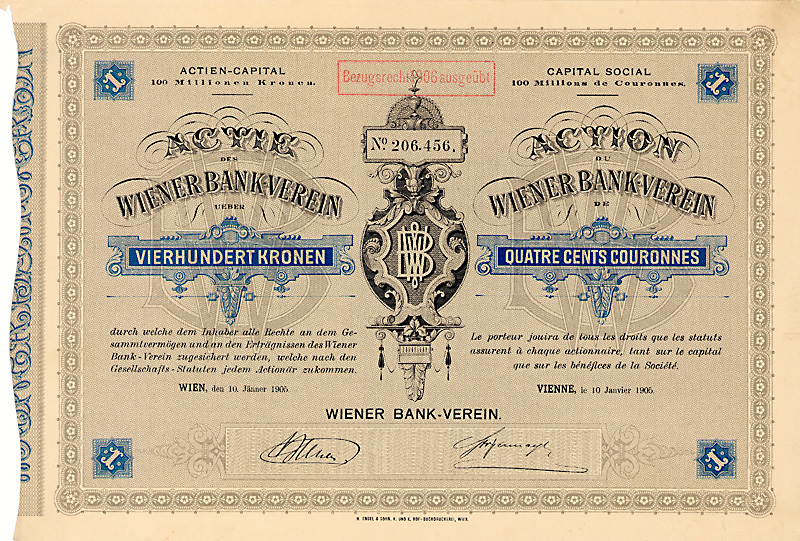
Wiener Bankverein share certificate, January 1905

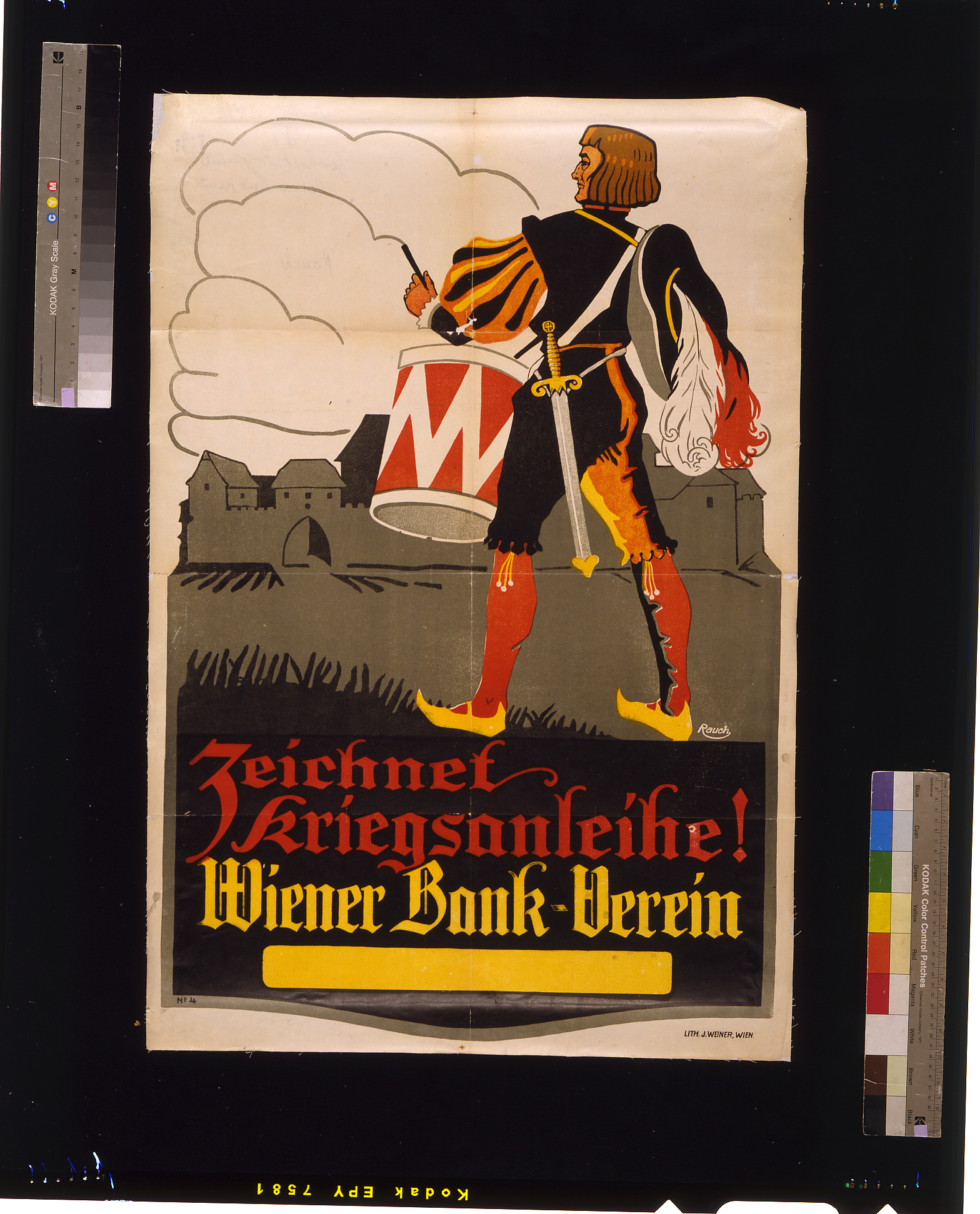
Wartime poster of Wiener Bankverein, 1914

The Wiener Bankverein's creation was sponsored in 1869 by the Allgemeine Bodencreditanstalt, which had been established in Vienna in 1863. In 1871, with assistance from Anglo-Austrian Bank and Darmstädter Bank, it sponsored the creation of a joint-stock bank in Constantinople, the Austro-Ottomanische Bank; but that venture soon faltered and was acquired by the Imperial Ottoman Bank in 1874. It the late 19th century, the WBV became active in financing ventures in southeastern Europe including railways in the Balkans and petroleum production in Romania. In 1890, it founded the Hungarian Industrial and Commercial Bank in Budapest, with privileged tax status granted by ad hoc legislation. In 1895, it led the creation of the Landesbank für Bosnien und Herzegowina in Sarajevo. In 1906, it returned to Constantinople and opened a branch office there, soon followed by the construction of a prominent branch building inaugurated in 1912. It opened a branch in Zagreb in 1908. By 1912, it had the largest network of all Austrian joint-stock banks, with 49 branches in comparison to 31 for the Länderbank and 21 for the Creditanstalt.

On 25 July 1914, the prospect of impending war triggered a bank run at the Wiener Bankverein's branch in Constantinople, which was subsequently closed on 1 August 1914. It opened a branch in Belgrade under Austro-Hungarian occupation in 1916 during World War I.

== Austrian Republic ==
Following the war's end and post-war financial turmoil in the newly formed First Austrian Republic, the Société Générale de Belgique (SGB) and its affiliate the Banque Belge pour l'Étranger (BBE) recapitalized Wiener Bankverein in 1920, joined in 1922 by Basler Handelsbank and in 1927 by Dillon, Read & Co..

Following the banking crisis of 1931, the Bankverein experienced financial distress. In 1932, it transferred a significant portfolio of problem assets to a government-owned vehicle, the Gesellschaft für Revision und Treuhandige Verwaltung and issued new shares to restore its capital base, but that transaction and a similar one in 1933 proved insufficient. Eventually, the Wiener Bankverein was merged on 31 December 1933 into the recapitalized Creditanstalt, which simultaneously took over the viable operations of Niederösterreichische Escompte-Gesellschaft. The resulting merged entity adopted the name Österreichische Creditanstalt - Wiener Bankverein, in short Creditanstalt-Bankverein.

== Affiliates in Czechoslovakia, Poland and Yugoslavia ==
As part of their restructuring of the WBV, the Société Générale de Belgique and Banque Belge pour l'Étranger created new domestic banks in the Empire's successor states, in which they initially had joint controlling ownership together with their partner the Basler Handelsbank:

- the Czech General Bank Union (Czech: Všeobecná česká bankovní jednota, German: Allgemeiner Böhmischer Bank-Verein) in Prague, formed in 1921 from 18 former WBV branches; merged during the 1930s into the Böhmische Union Bank;
- the General Bank Union in Poland (Polish: Powszechny Bank Związkowy w Polsce, German: Allgemeiner Bankverein in Polen) in Lviv, formed in 1922 from 8 former WBV branches; it relocated to Warsaw in 1930, and was eventually liquidated in the late 1940s;
- the General Yugoslavian Bank Union (Serbo-Croatian: Opšte jugoslovensko bankarsko društvo, German: Allgemeiner Jugoslawischer Bankverein - AJB), formed in 1928 from the two former WBV branches in Belgrade and Zagreb. Its investors simultaneously gained influence over the Landesbank für Bosnien und Herzegowina in Sarajevo.

The AJB gained prominence in Yugoslavia during the 1930s, when it was the largest bank to avoid falling under a "moratorium" on its liabilities following the European banking crisis of 1931. In 1940 following the German invasion of Belgium, Deutsche Bank bought out the Belgian stake under duress and became its dominant shareholder, with 88 percent held either directly or through Creditanstalt, also under Deutsche Bank's control since Anschluss in 1938; businessman Franz Neuhausen became its Chairman. Deutsche Bank simultaneously took control of the Landesbank in Sarajevo. Following the German invasion of Yugoslavia, the AJB was divided into two separate institutions:

- the Bankverein AG Belgrad, still chaired by Neuhausen, became the largest credit institution in occupied Serbia; it took over the Belgrade branches of the Yugoslav United Bank and of the Prague Credit Bank.
- the Bankverein für Kroatien AG, chaired by Nikola Berković, had a similarly strong position in the Independent State of Croatia.

Both banks' assets were confiscated by the newly established Communist authorities in October 1944, and they were subsequently liquidated.

== Buildings ==
=== Vienna head office ===
From its foundation in 1869, the Wiener Bankverein's head office was at Herrengasse 6-8, later extended to what was then Herrengasse 10, in the former Palais Liechtenstein. In 1912, the WBV moved to a new head office it had built at the corner of Schottenring and Schottengasse, on a design by architects Ernst Gotthilf and Alexander Neumann; the Palais Liechtenstein was promptly demolished, and replaced in the 1930s by the high-rise building branded Hochhaus Herrengasse.

The WBV building on Schottengasse later became the headquarters of the merged Creditanstalt-Bankverein from 1934, then of Bank Austria from 1997, and of Bank Austria-Creditanstalt from 2002 to 2017. The building was then renovated and converted into a commercial compound branded Haus am Schottentor, including an Interspar hypermarket, and inaugurated in 2021.

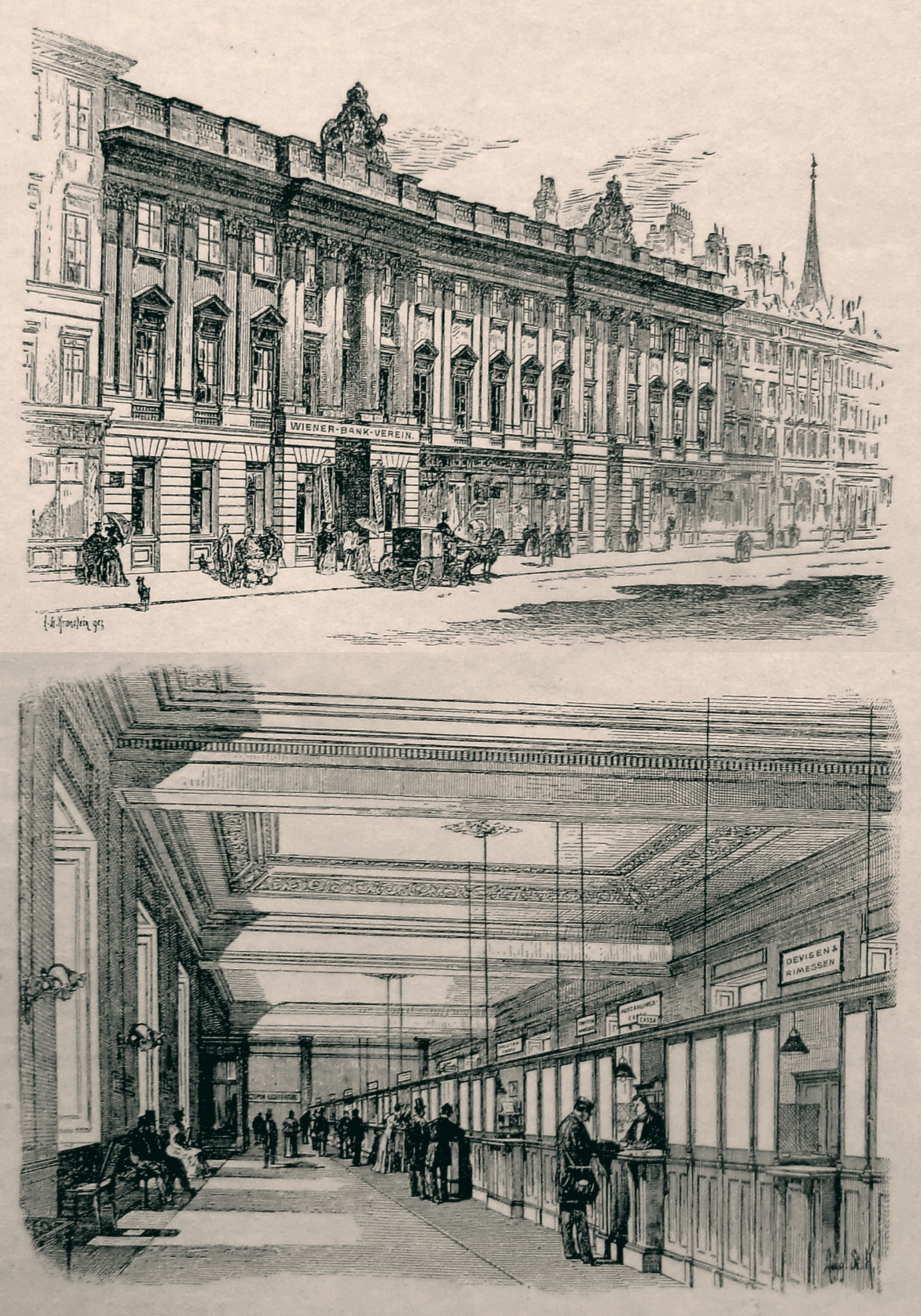
Wiener Bankverein's first head office at Palais Liechtenstein on Herrengasse, pictured in 1893

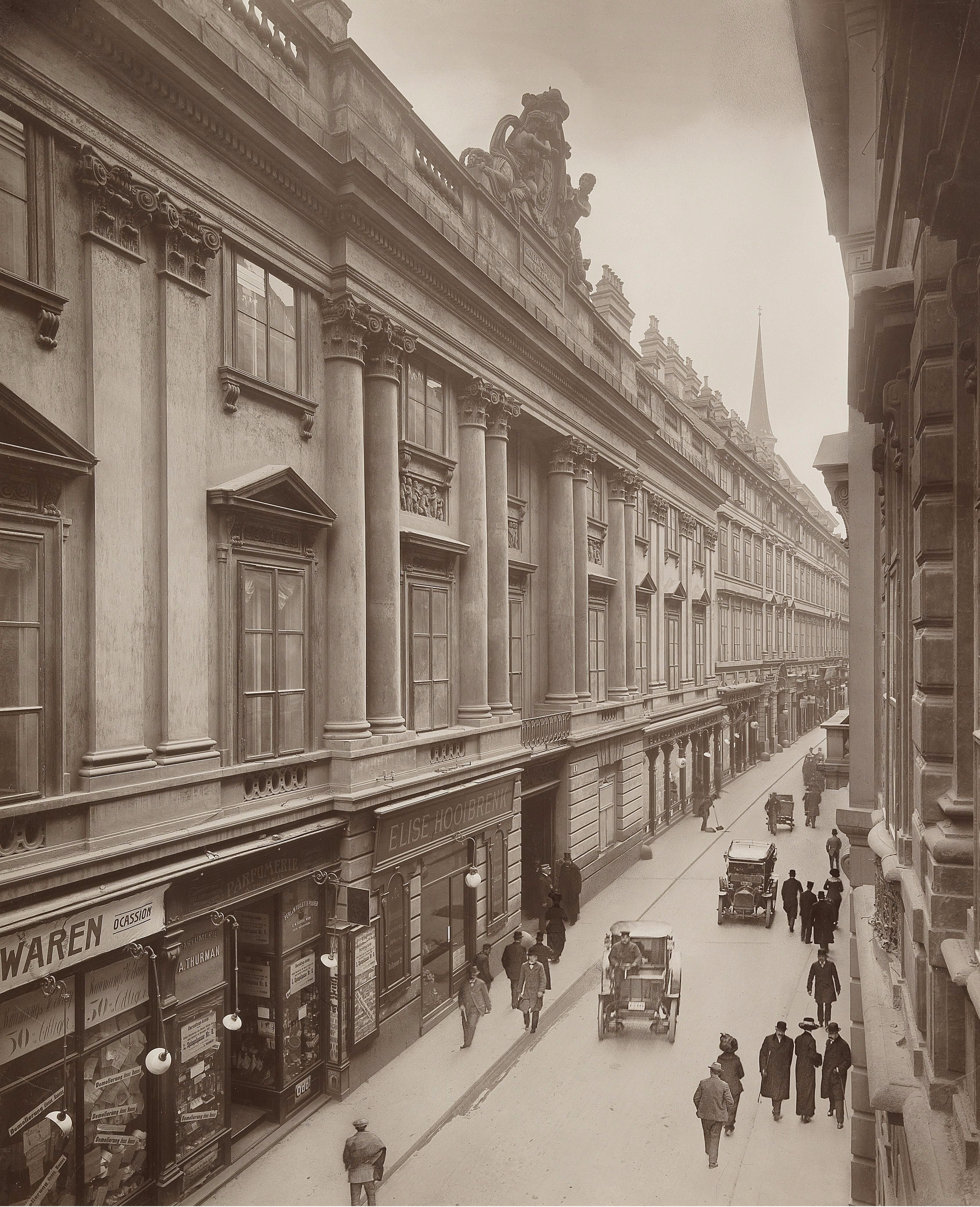
Palais Liechtenstein, photographed in 1905

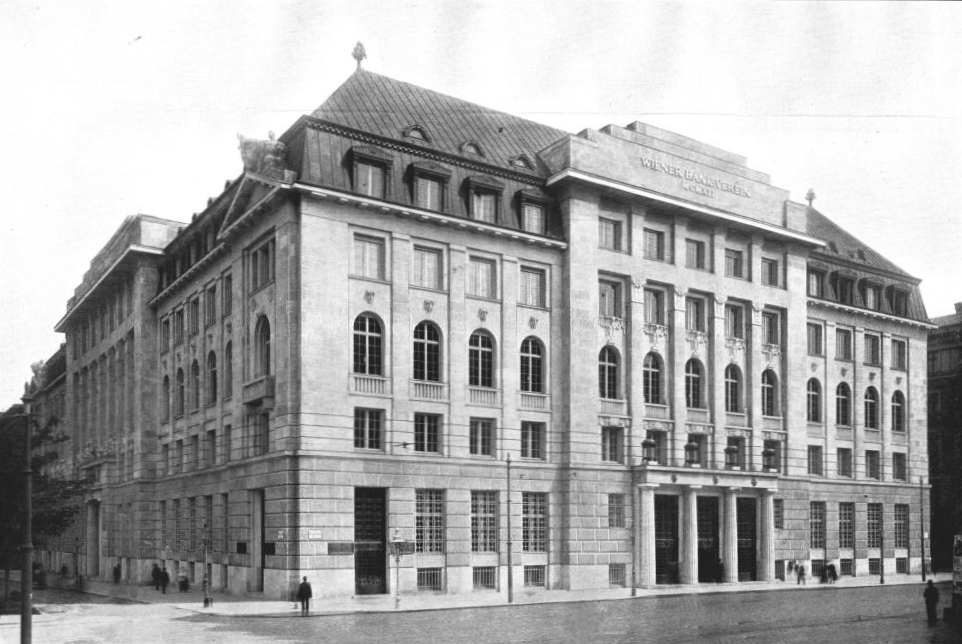
Head office of the Wiener Bankverein on Schottengasse in Vienna, 1913

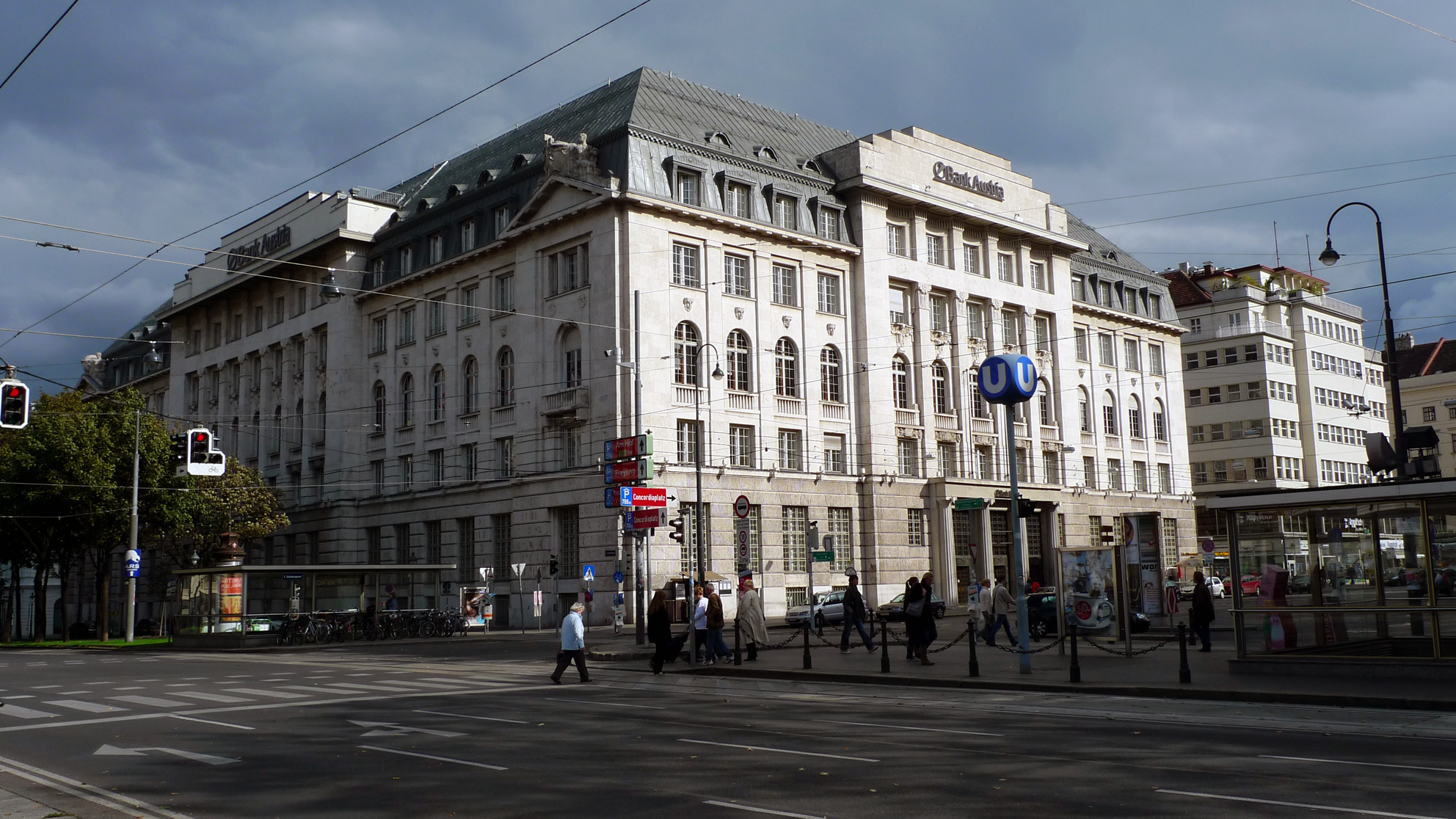
The same building, head office of Bank Austria in 2009

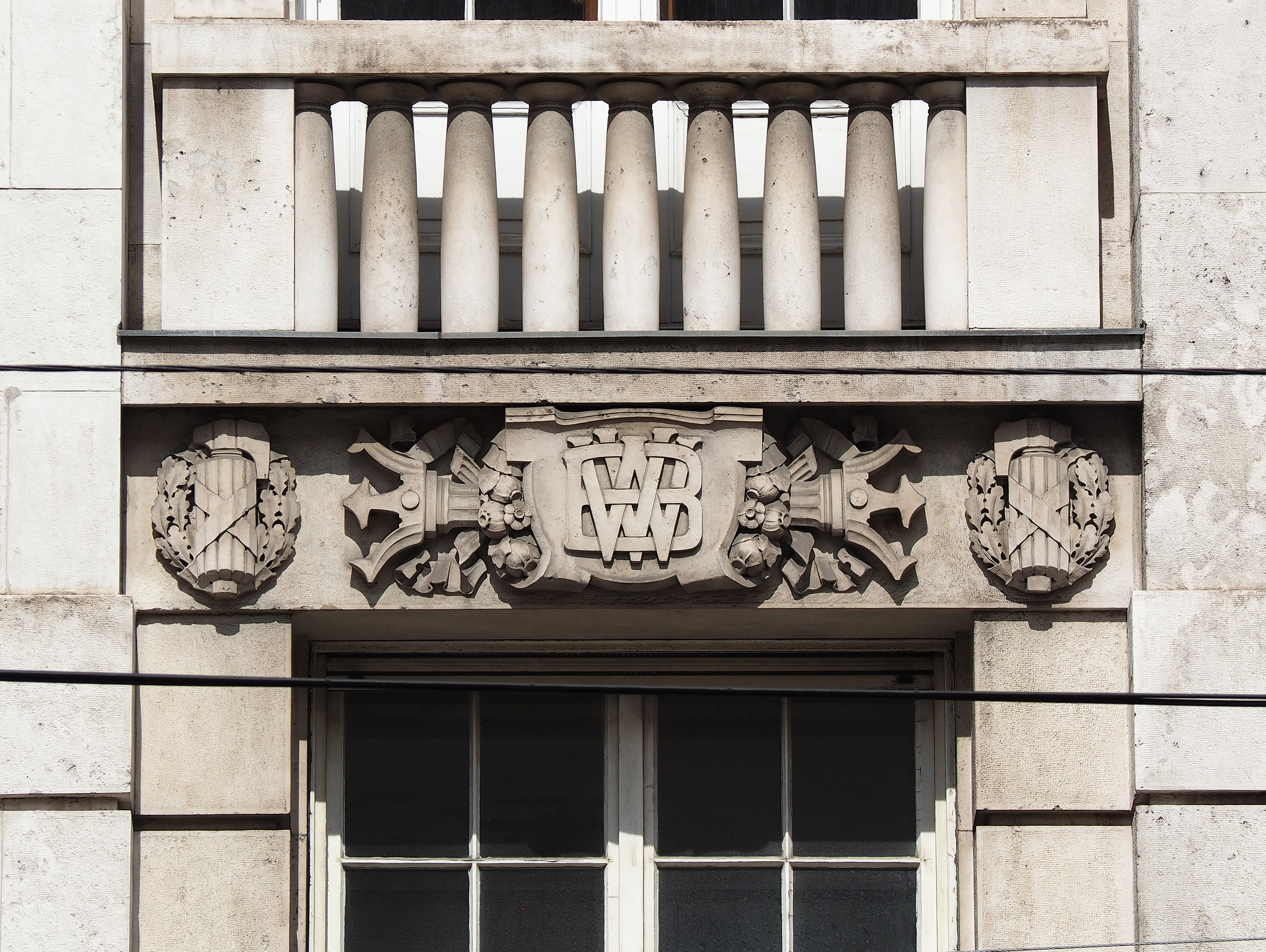
Monogram WBV on the Vienna head office building

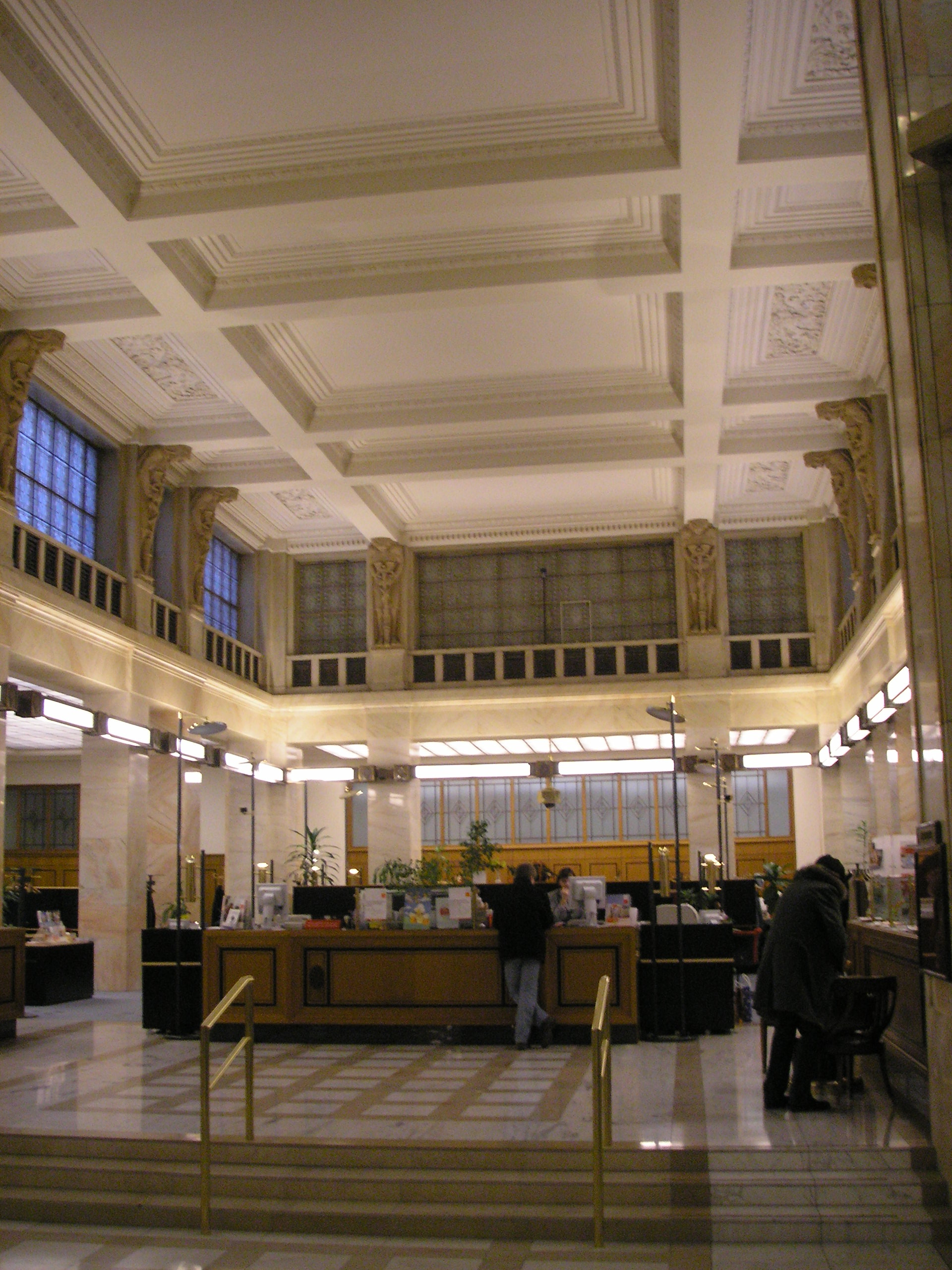
Main hall of the former head office, 2005

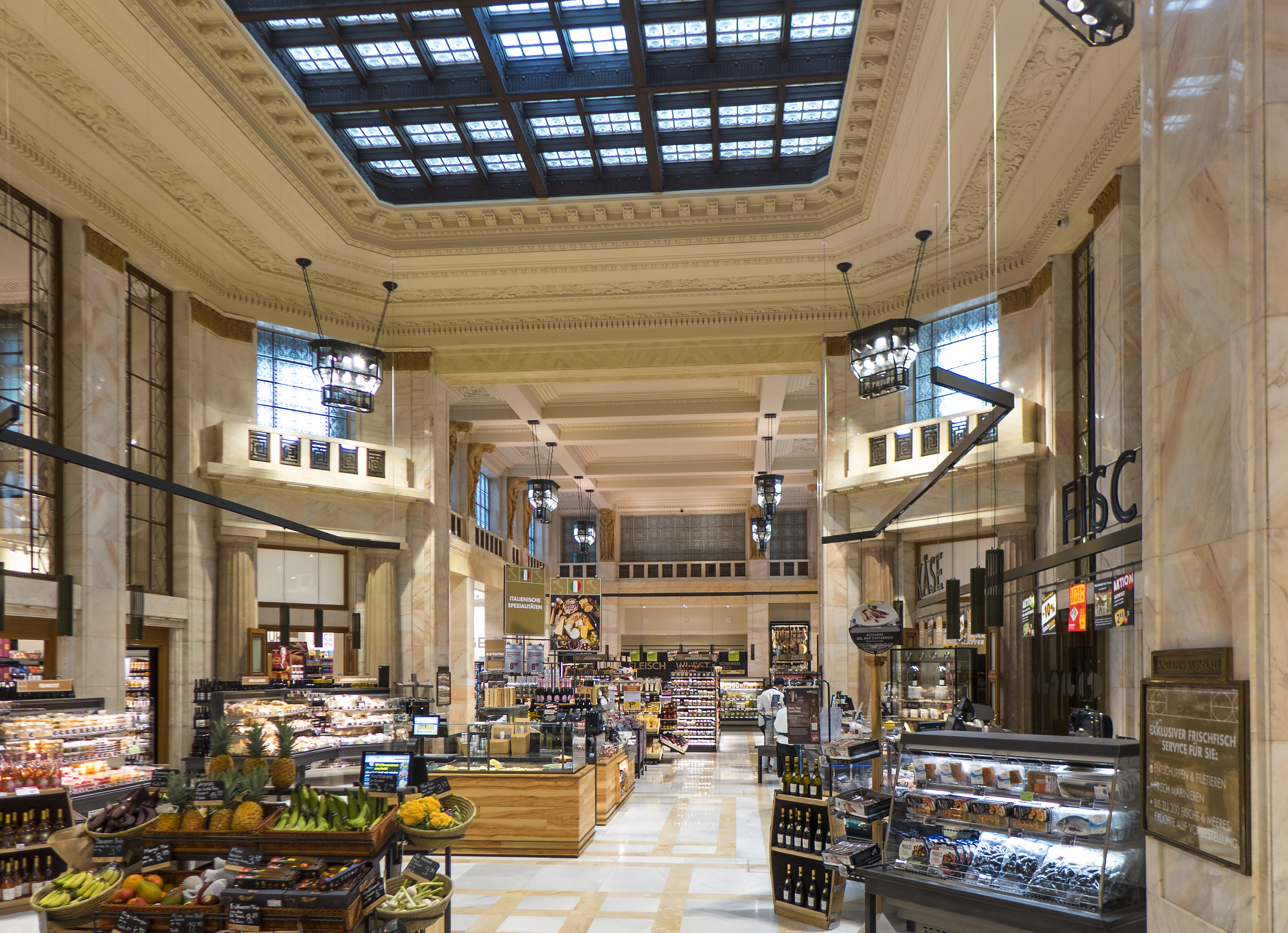
The same space repurposed as a food store, June 2021

=== Other locations ===
The Wiener Bankverein also erected a branch office building in the Galata neighborhood of Constantinople, on a highly visible location at the northern entrance of the Golden Horn, designed by Gotthilf and Neumann and completed in 1912. In 1921, the property was acquired by the newly created Banque Française des Pays d'Orient. In the 1930s, it was used by the Turkish tobacco concern that had succeeded the Ottoman Tobacco Company in 1925, and in 1944 became a branch of Ziraat Bank.

The WBV branch office in Prague was designed by Neumann and Josef Zasche and completed in 1908, with expressionist sculptures by Franz Metzner. Around that time, the WBV had branches in Agram (later Zagreb), Aussig an der Elbe (Ústí nad Labem), Bielitz-Biala (Bielsko-Biała), Brünn (Brno), Czernowitz (Chernivtsi), Graz, Karlsbad (Karlovy Vary), Klagenfurt, Krakau (Kraków), Lemberg (Lviv), Pilsen (Plzeň), and Teplitz (Teplice) in addition to Vienna, Prague and Constantinople.

A new branch building in Zagreb was designed by Gotthilf and Neumann and completed in 1923; it was renovated in the 2010s and converted into Amadria Park Hotel.

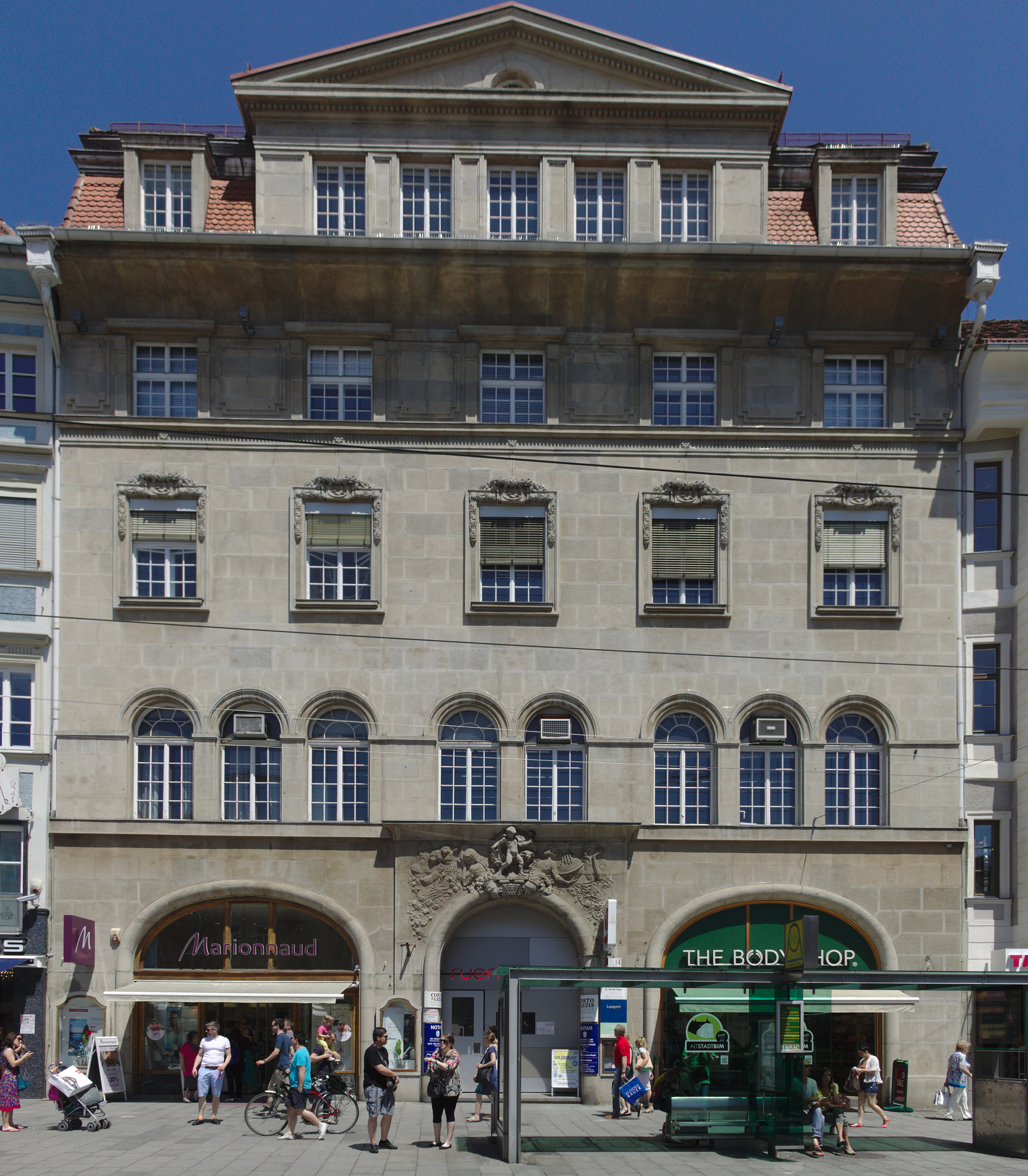
Former branch building in Graz, Hauptplatz 14, in 2014

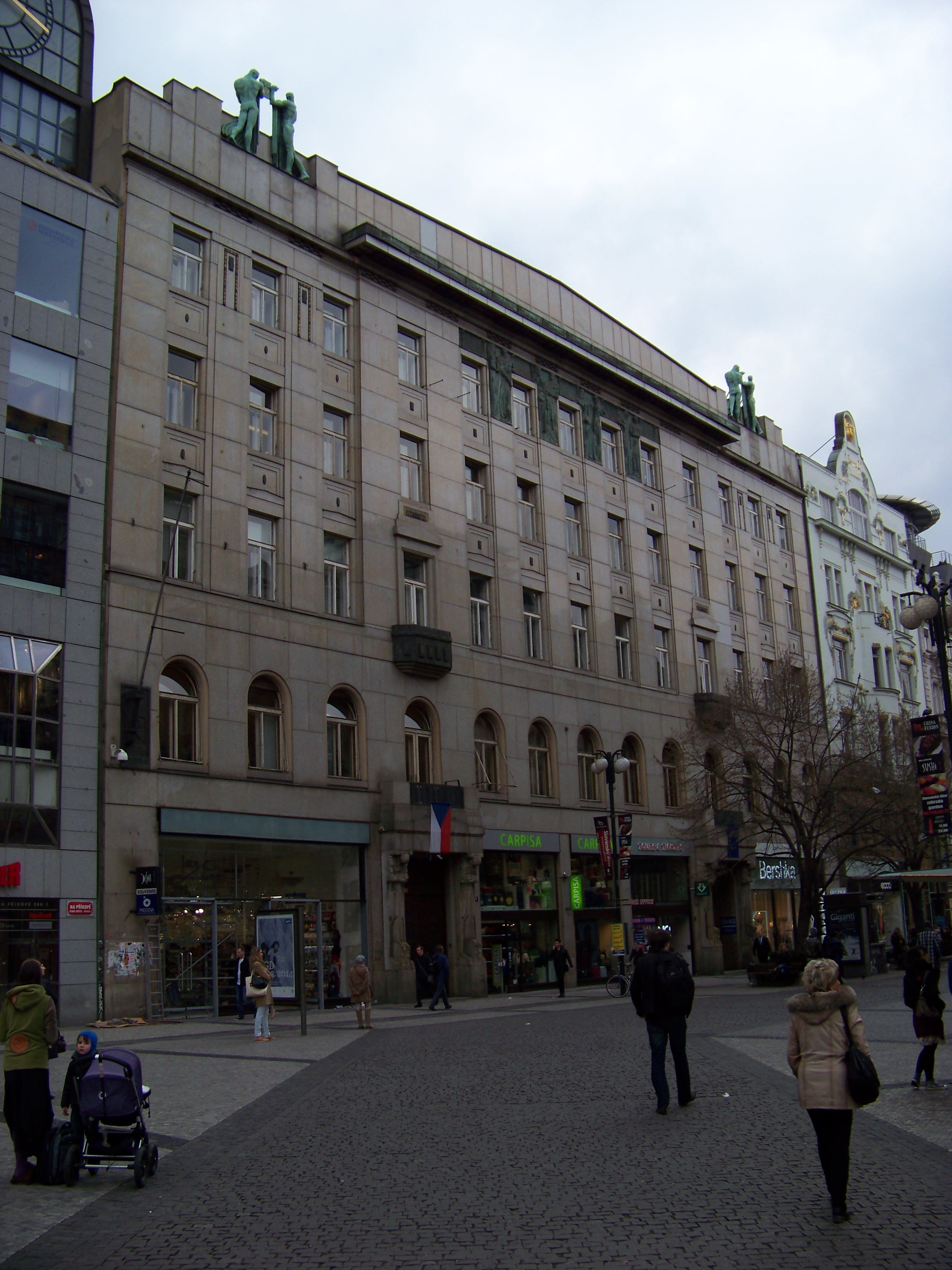
Former branch building in Prague, Na příkopě 3-5, in 2014

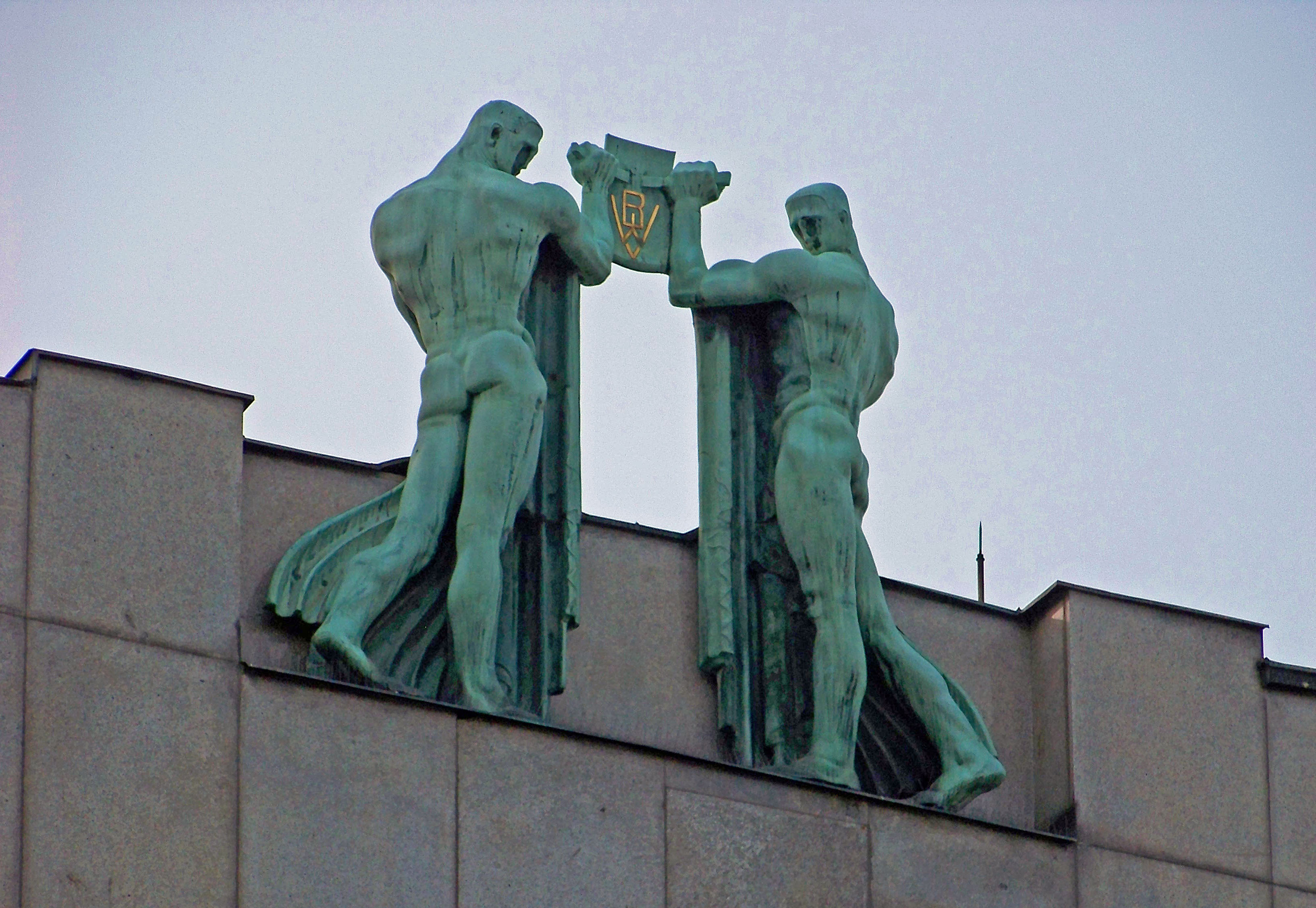
Sculpture by Frank Metzner with WBV monogram, former Prague branch

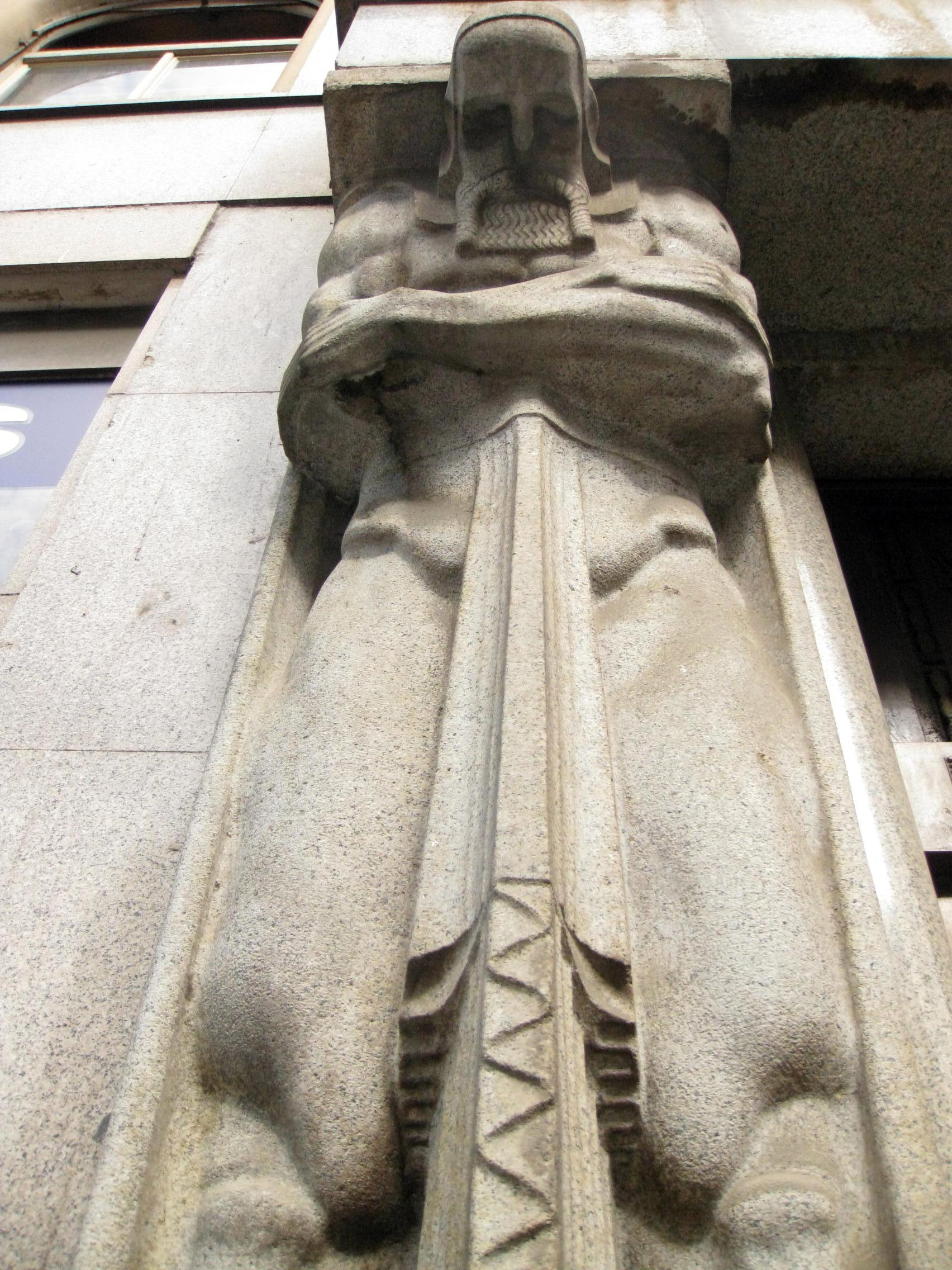
Atlante by Frank Metzner, former Prague branch

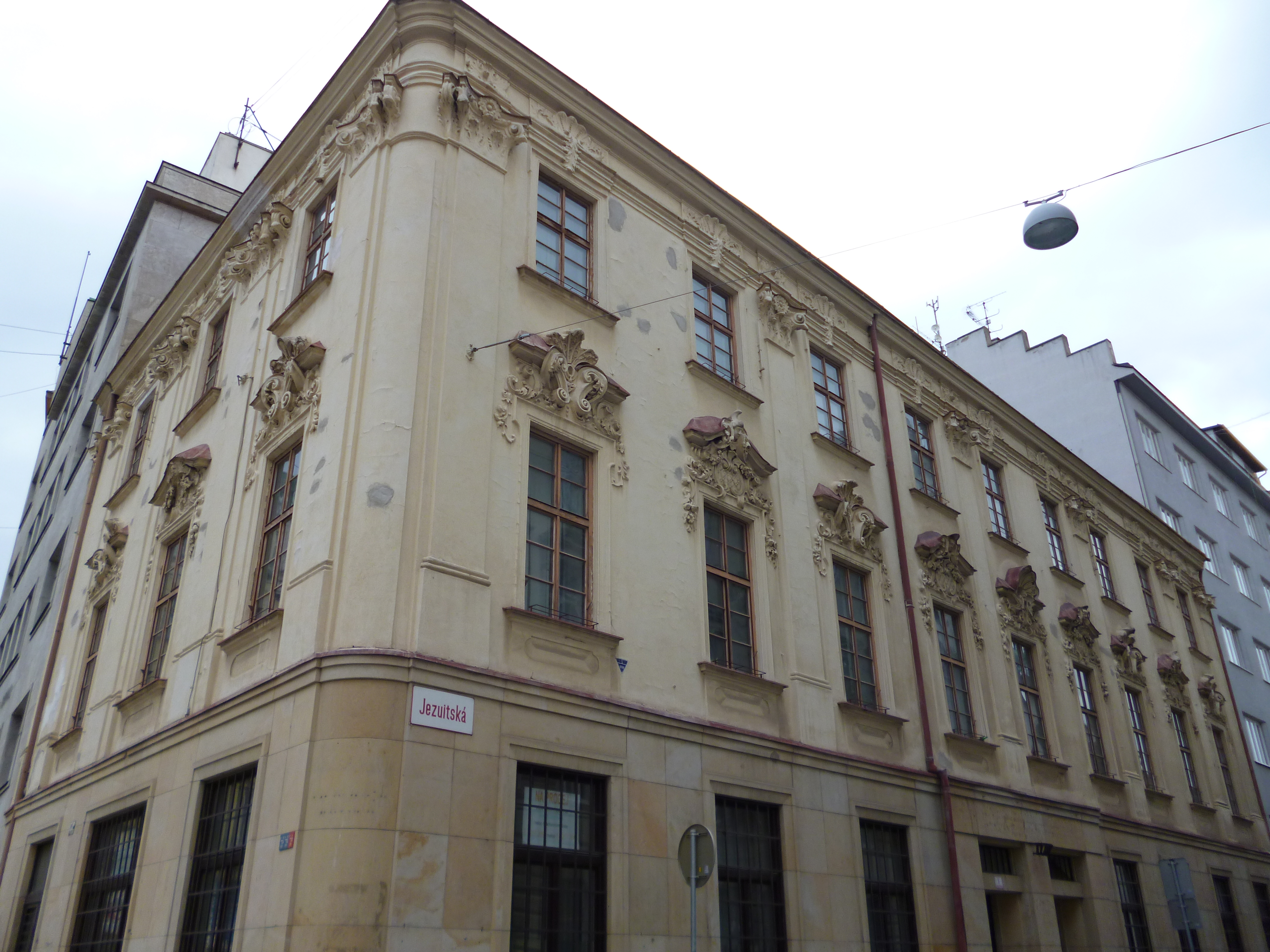
Former branch building in Brno, Jezuitská 1, in 2012

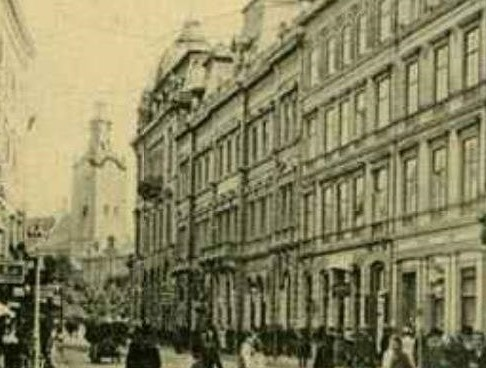
Former branch building in Lviv, Jagiellonska ulica (now Hnatyuka) 3 (center), on a 1908 postcard

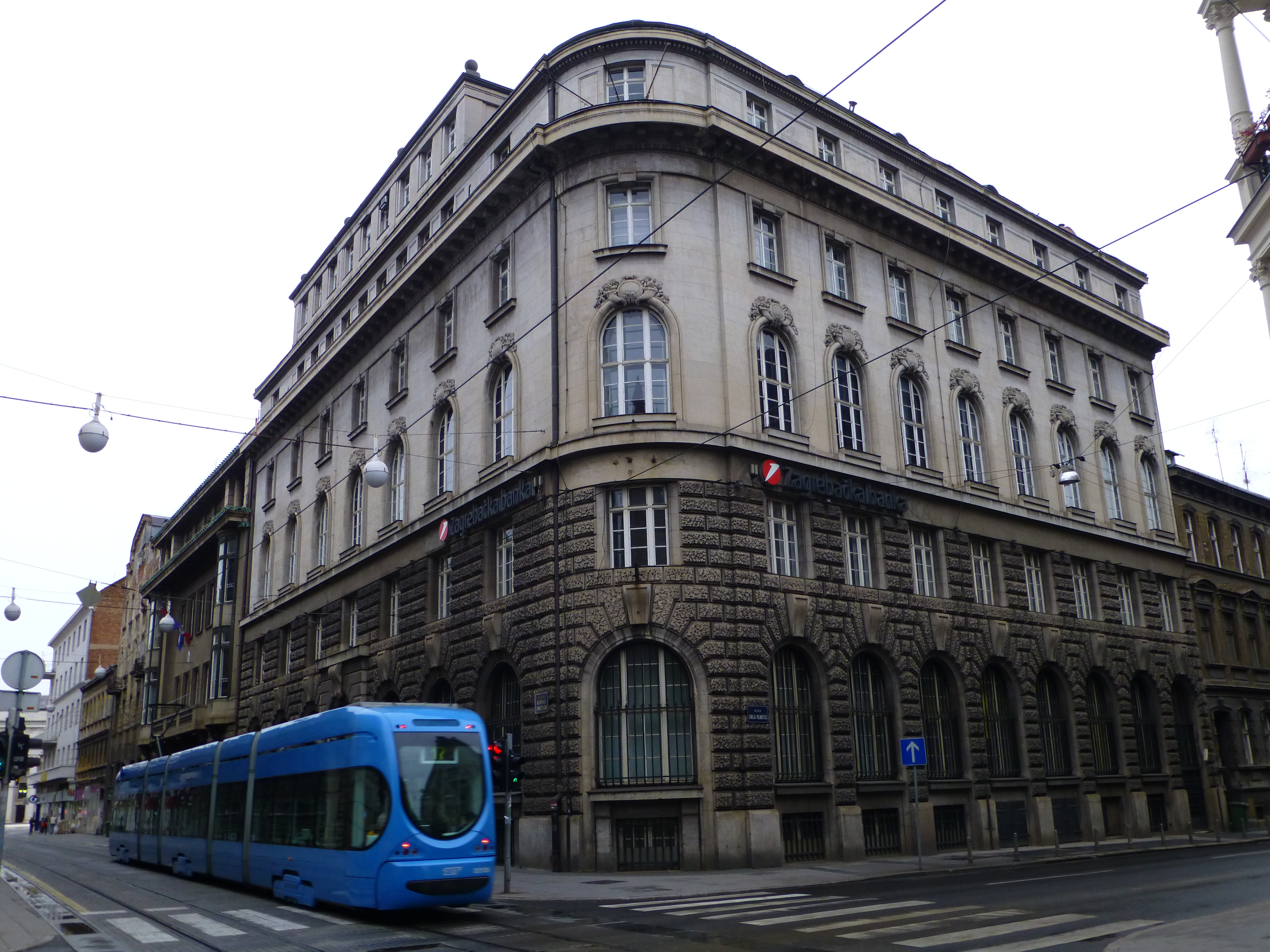
Former branch building in Zagreb, later seat of the Allgemeiner Jugoslawischer Bankverein then of the Bankverein für Kroatien, photographed in 2013

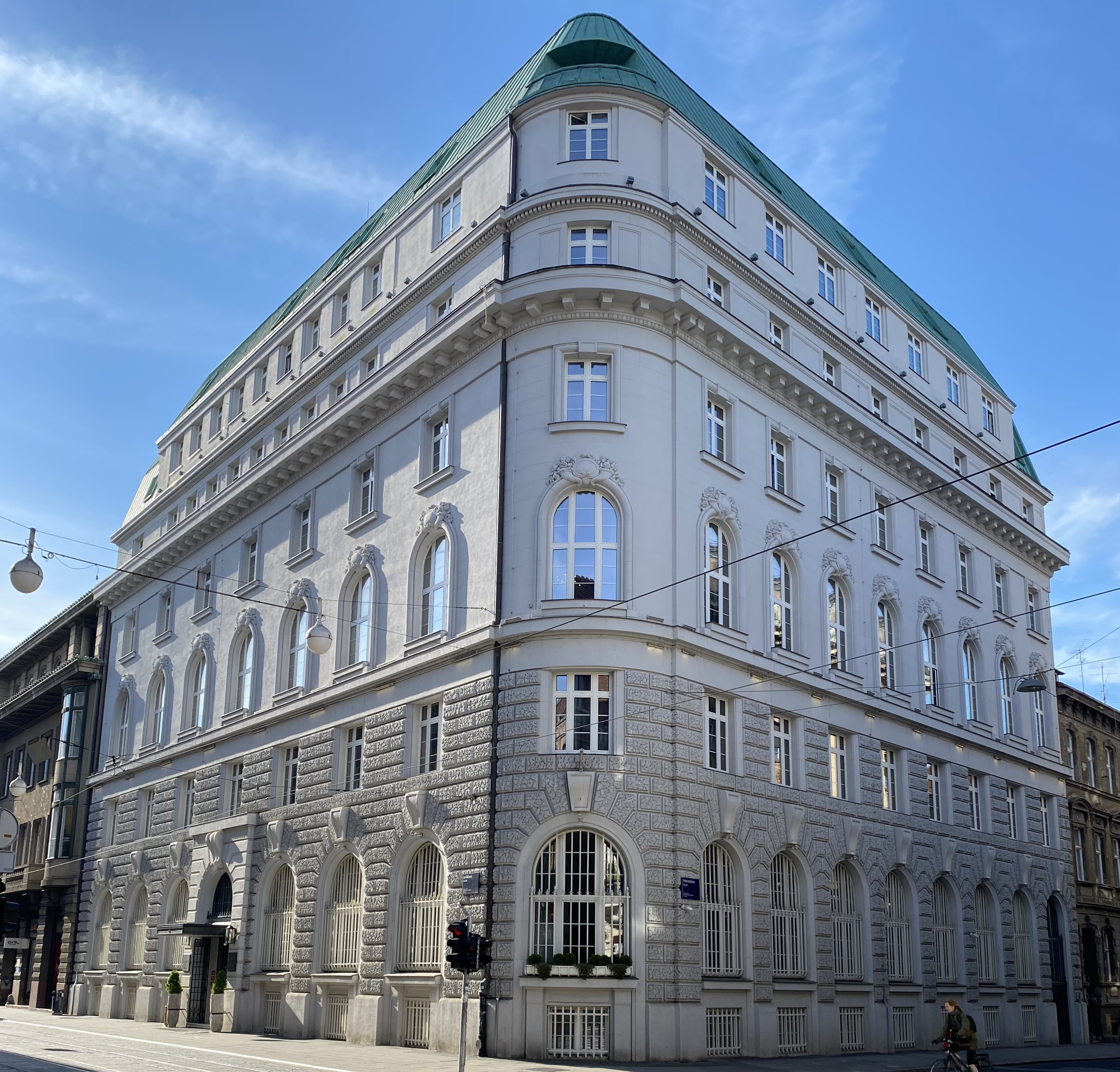
Same building in 2024 following renovation and upwards extension, repurposed as a hotel

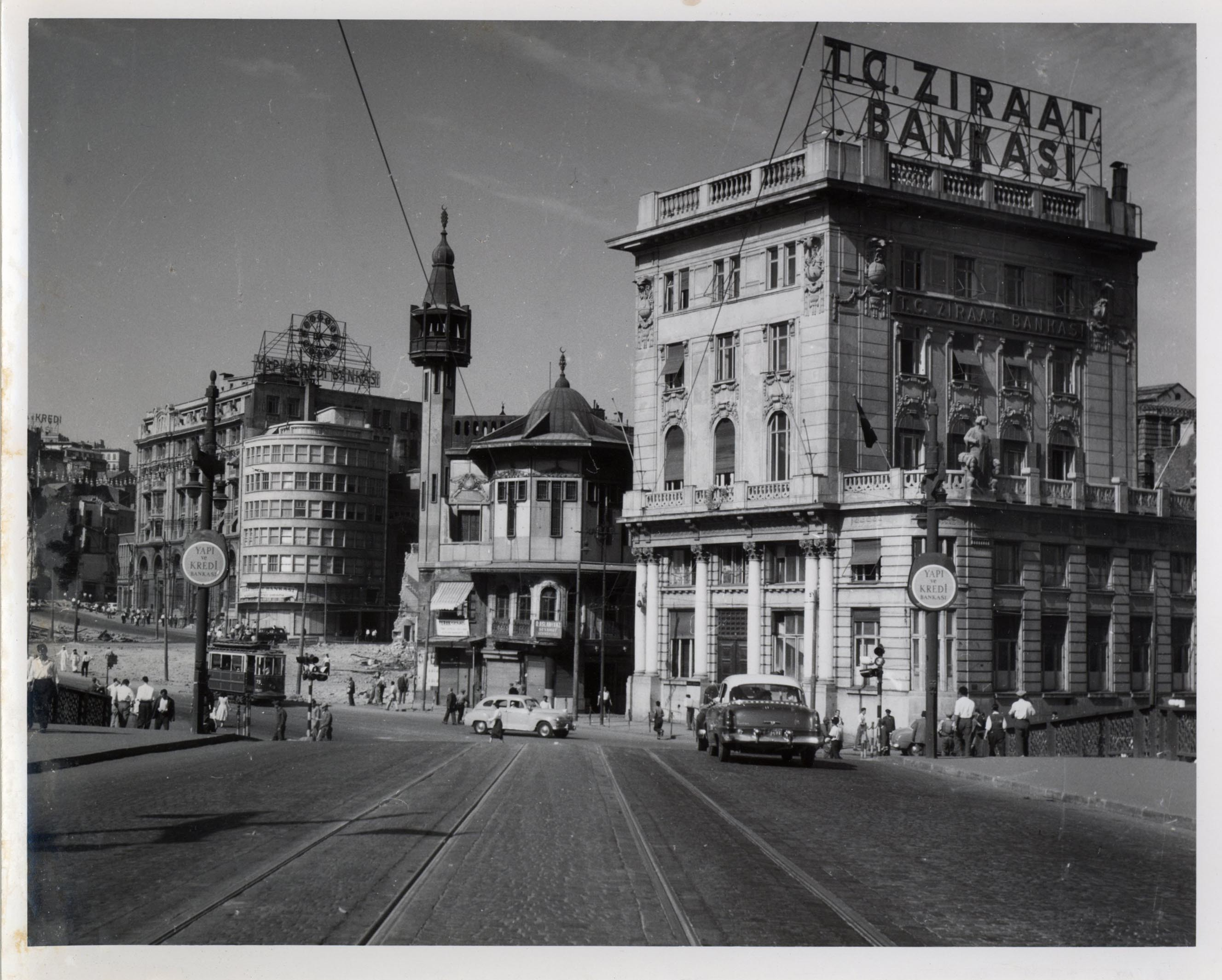
Former branch building in Istanbul, photographed in 1958 before demolition of the nearby Merzifonlu Kara Mustafa Pasha Mosque

== See also ==
- Creditanstalt
- Länderbank
- Anglo-Austrian Bank
- List of banks in Austria
