= Länderbank =

Defunct large Austrian bank

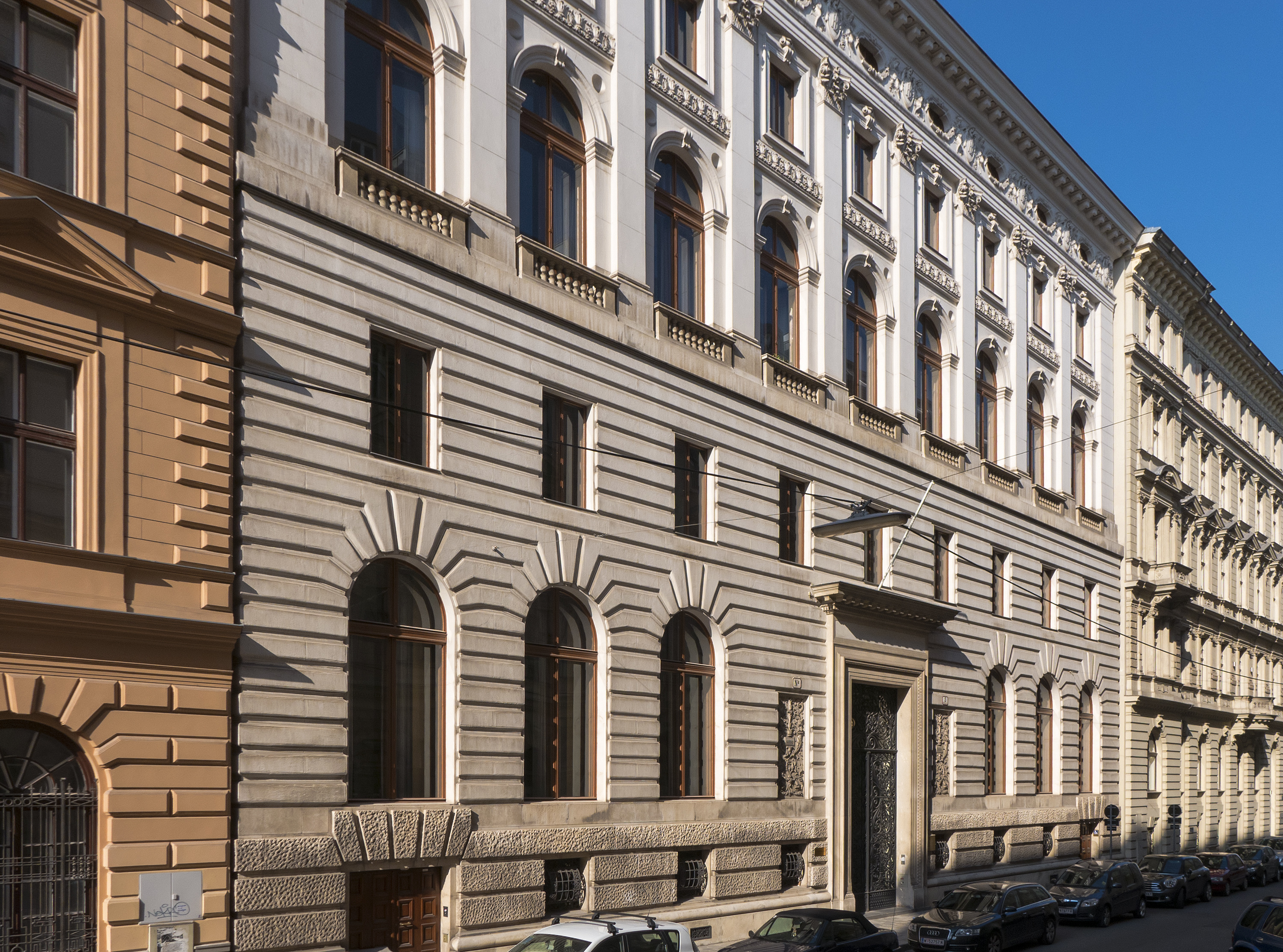
The building in Vienna designed by Otto Wagner for Länderbank, its head office from 1884 to 1938

The Länderbank, full original name k. k. privilegierte Österreichische Länderbank (lit. 'Imperial and Royal Privileged Austrian Bank of the Lands'), was a major Austrian bank, created in 1880. In 1922 its head office was moved to Paris under the name Banque des Pays de l'Europe Centrale (BPEC, German: Zentral-Europäische Länderbank, lit. 'Bank of the Central European Countries'), even though its activity remained overwhelmingly in the Austrian operations. After the 1938 Anschluss the latter came under control of Dresdner Bank by the name Länderbank Wien. It was nationalized in 1946, renamed Österreichische Länderbank AG in 1948, and eventually merged in 1991 with Vienna's Zentralsparkasse to form Bank Austria, which in turn has been a subsidiary of UniCredit since 2005.

== Habsburg era ==
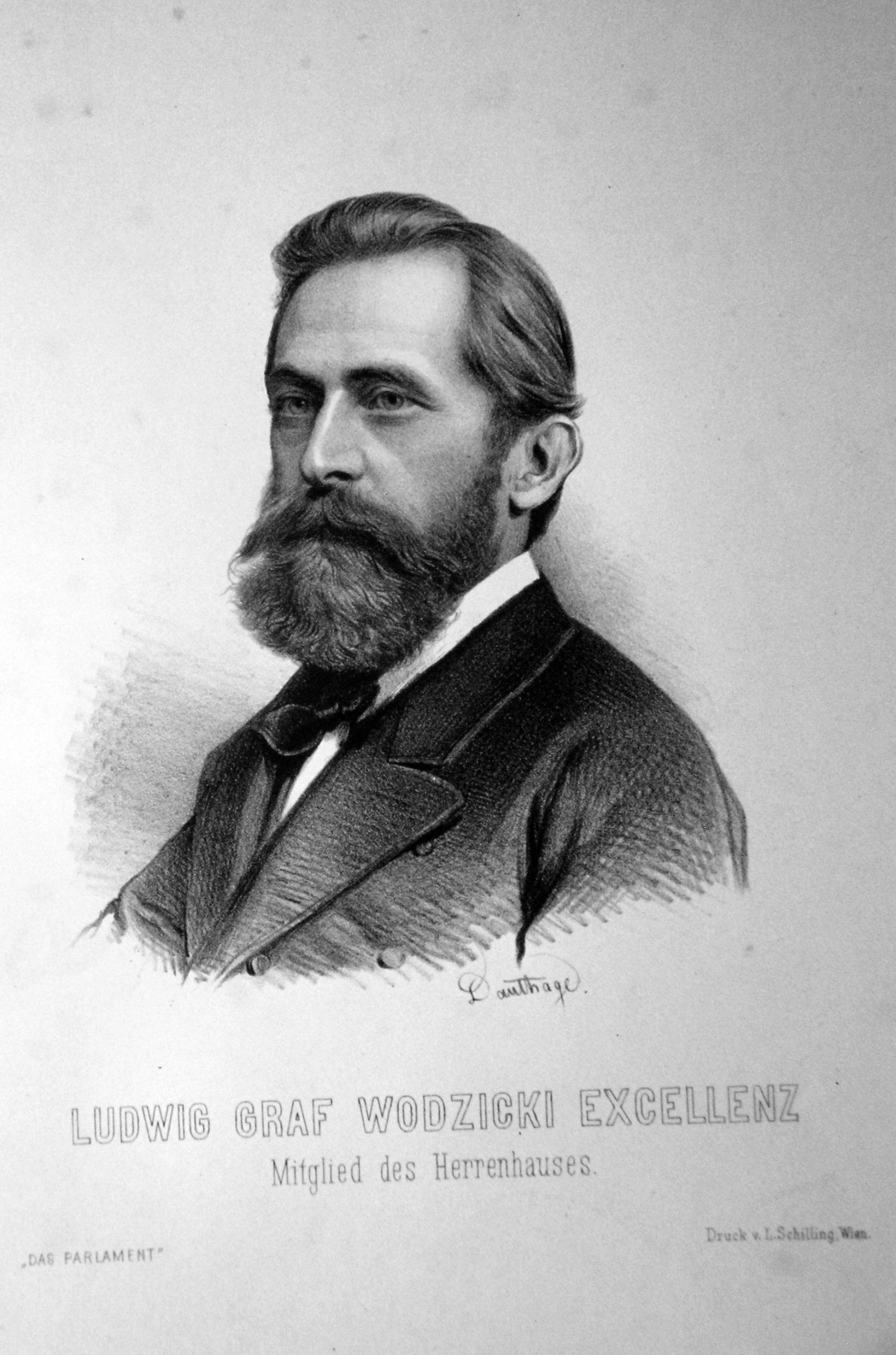
Ludwik Wodzicki (1834-1894), founding chairman (German: Gouverneur) of the Länderbank

The Länderbank was founded on 11 November 1880 as a part-owned subsidiary of Paris-based Union Générale, first chaired by Galician aristocrat Ludwik Wodzicki. Union Generale's promoter Paul Eugène Bontoux intended it as a conservative Catholic project against the financial power of the Jewish Rothschild family which led Austria-Hungary's largest bank, the Creditanstalt. In 1881 it sponsored an affiliate in Hungary, the Bank of the Hungarian Lands (German: Ungarische Länderbank, Hungarian: Magyar Országos Bank; sometimes also referred to as Ungarische Landesbank), which however collapsed in 1887.

The Union Générale itself failed in a spectacular financial scandal in 1882, and the fledgling Länderbank was taken over by Austrian interests. It soon expanded to become a significant institution, financing Austrian industrial projects and the early development of the newly established neighboring countries in the Balkans. Together with the Bank of Hungarian Lands, it was involved in the foundation of the Banque de Salonique in 1886-1888. It also developed a branch network in Austria-Hungary, starting with Prague in 1894 in cooperative relationship with the Böhmische Union Bank. By 1904 it had 15 branch locations in Vienna, 9 in the rest of the Empire, and 2 abroad (Paris opened in 1890, and London in 1903). Much of its activity remained connected with the city of Vienna led since 1897 by Karl Lueger, of which it became the main financer in 1908. In 1910, it sponsored the creation of the Galician People's Bank for Agriculture and Trade (German: Galizische Volksbank für Landwirtschaft und Handel, Polish: Galicyjski Bank Ludowy dla rolnictwa i handlu) in Lemberg, now Lviv.

By 1912, its network had further expanded to 31 branches, more than the Creditanstalt (21) and second only to the Wiener Bankverein (49). By 1913, 31.4 percent of the Länderbank's capital was held by French and German shareholders, making it more internationalized than either the Creditanstalt (17.8 percent) or the Bankverein (18.3 percent).

In 1914, the Länderbank's branches in Paris and London were confiscated immediately after the start of World War I, as were its operations in Serbia and Romania.

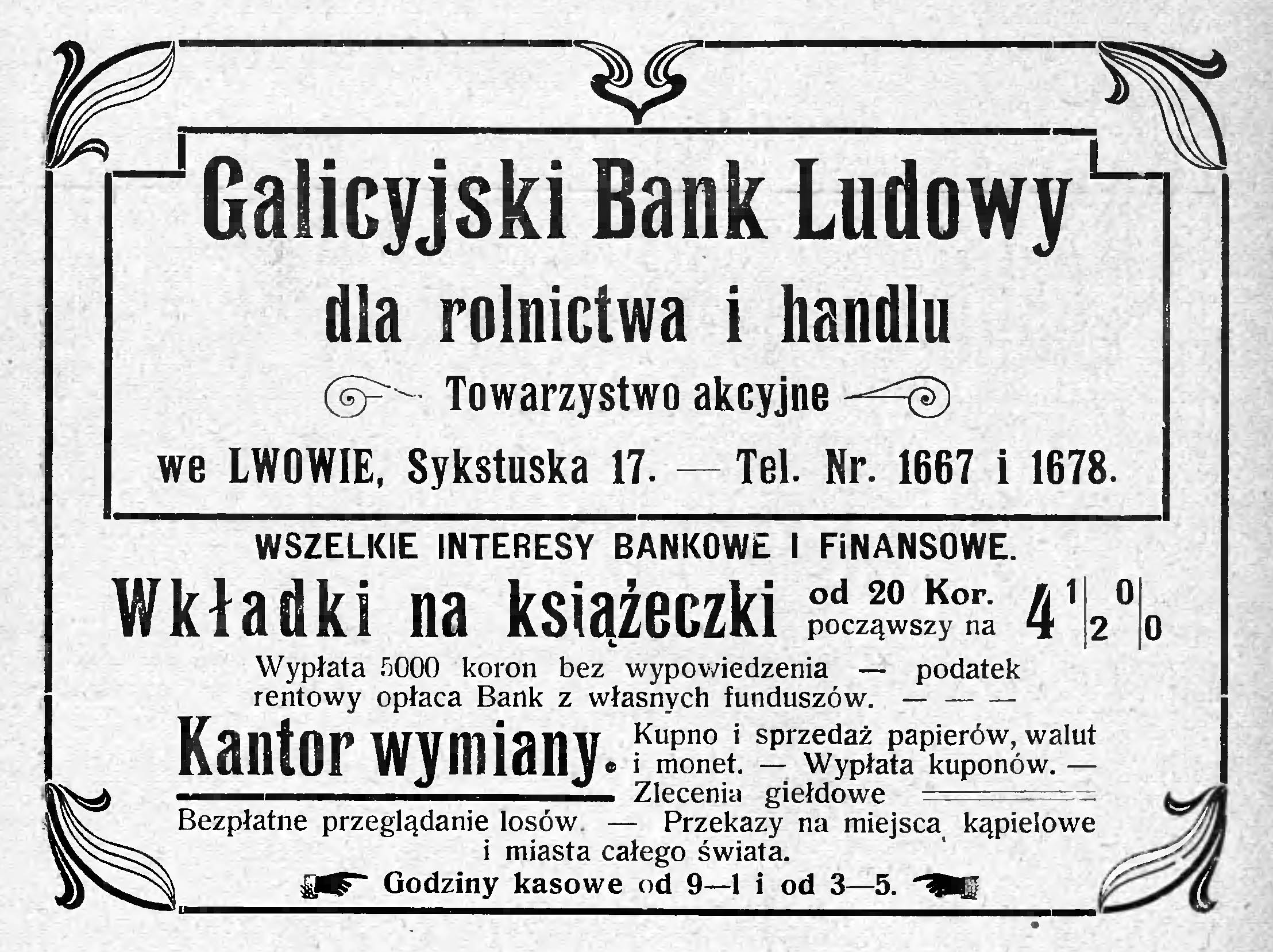
1913 advert for the Länderbank-sponsored Galician People's Bank for Agriculture and Trade

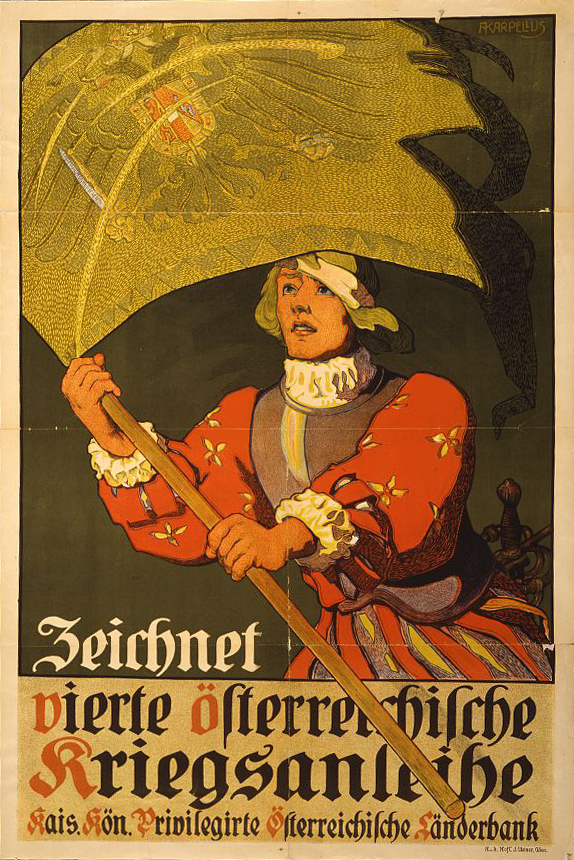
War poster, 1916

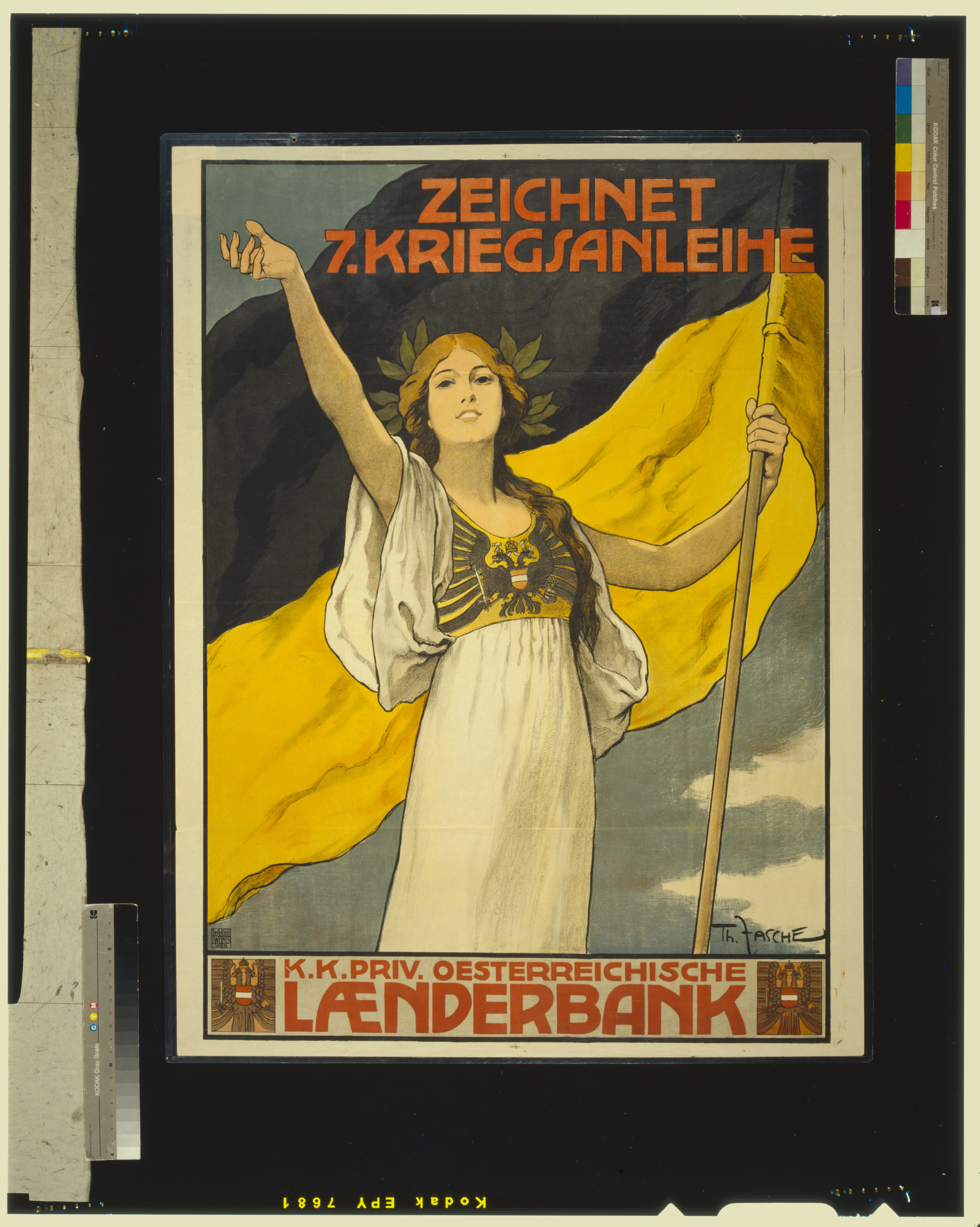
War poster, 1917

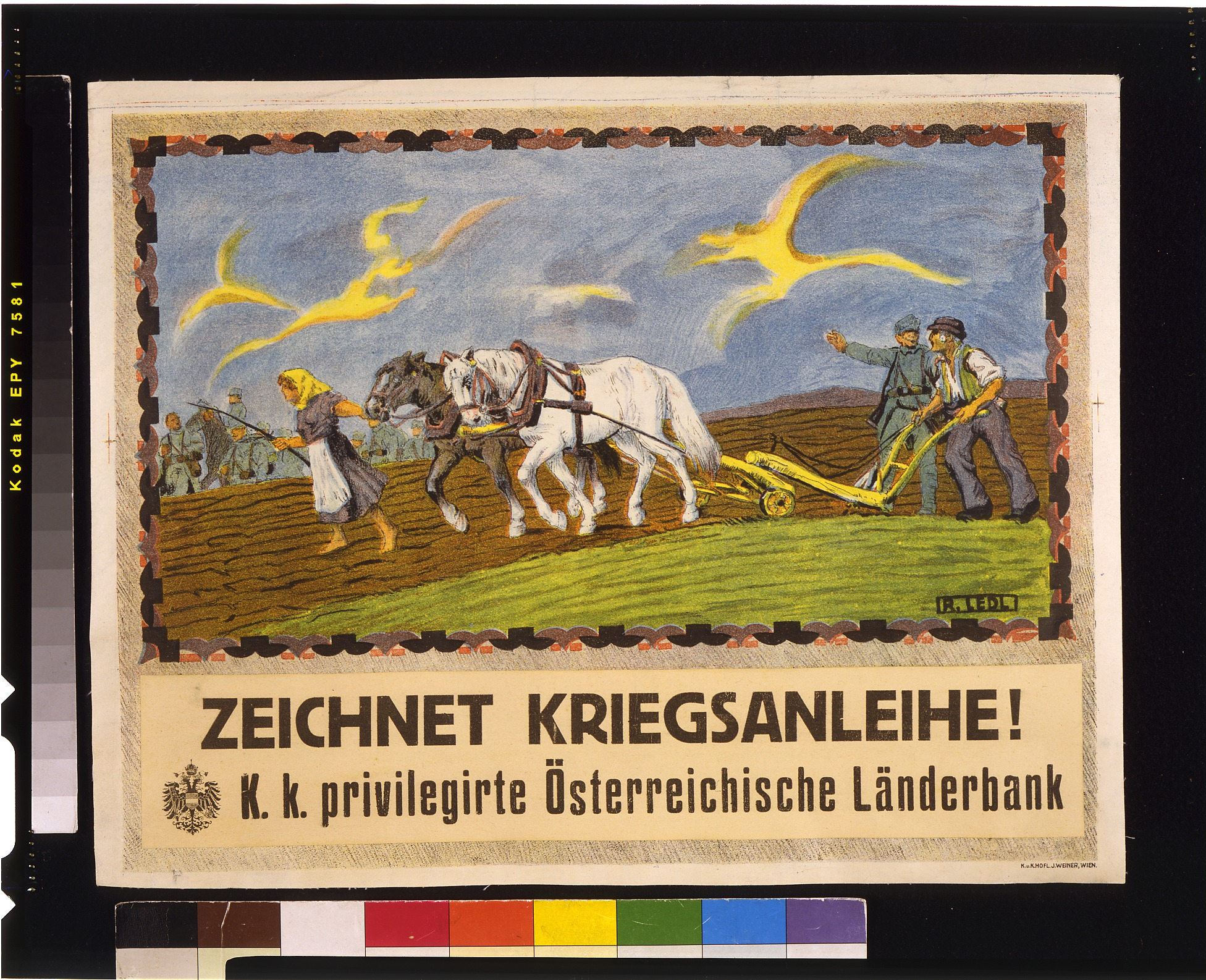
War poster, 1918

== Interwar period ==
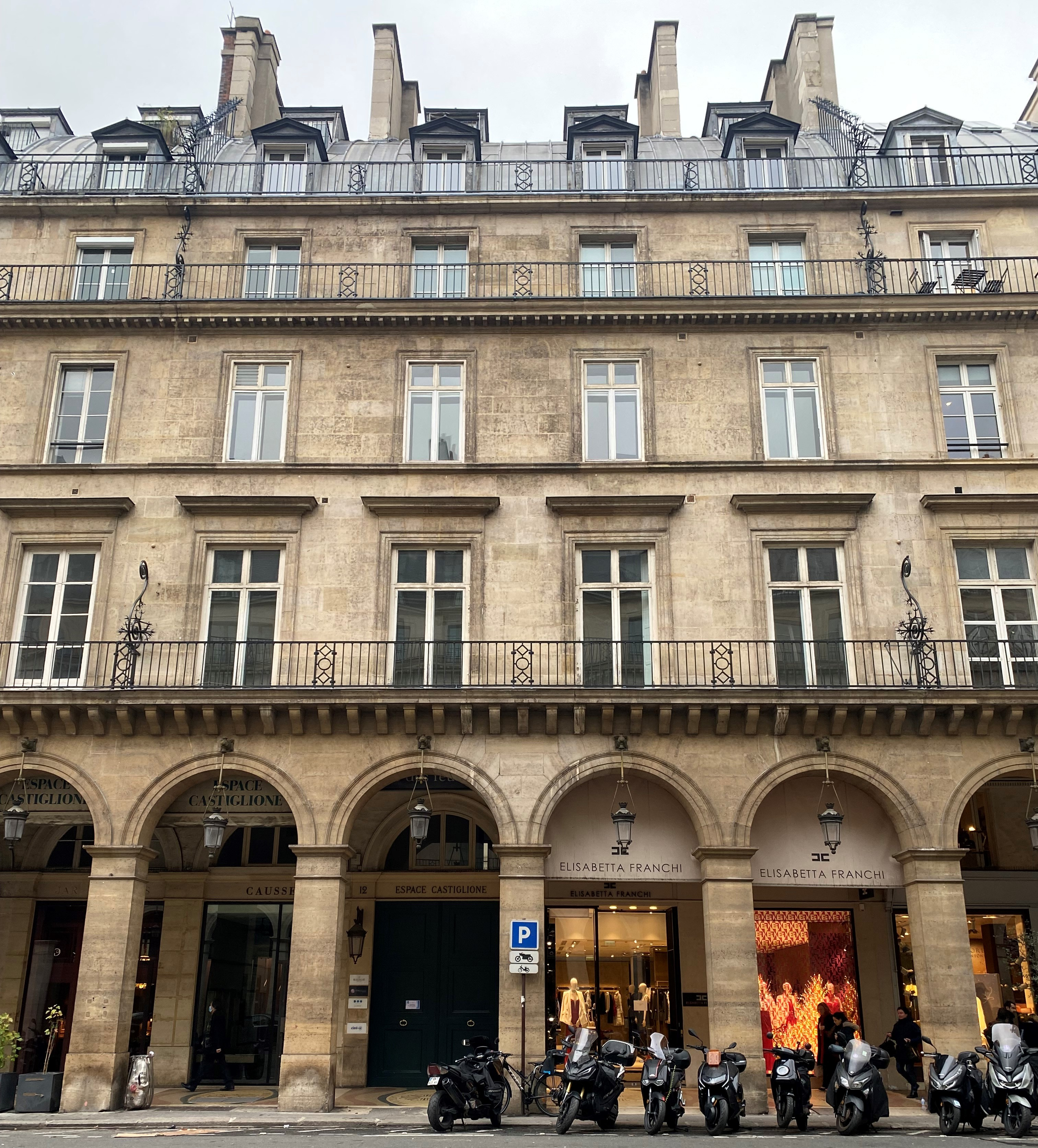
Former head office of the BPEC at 12, rue de Castiglione in Paris

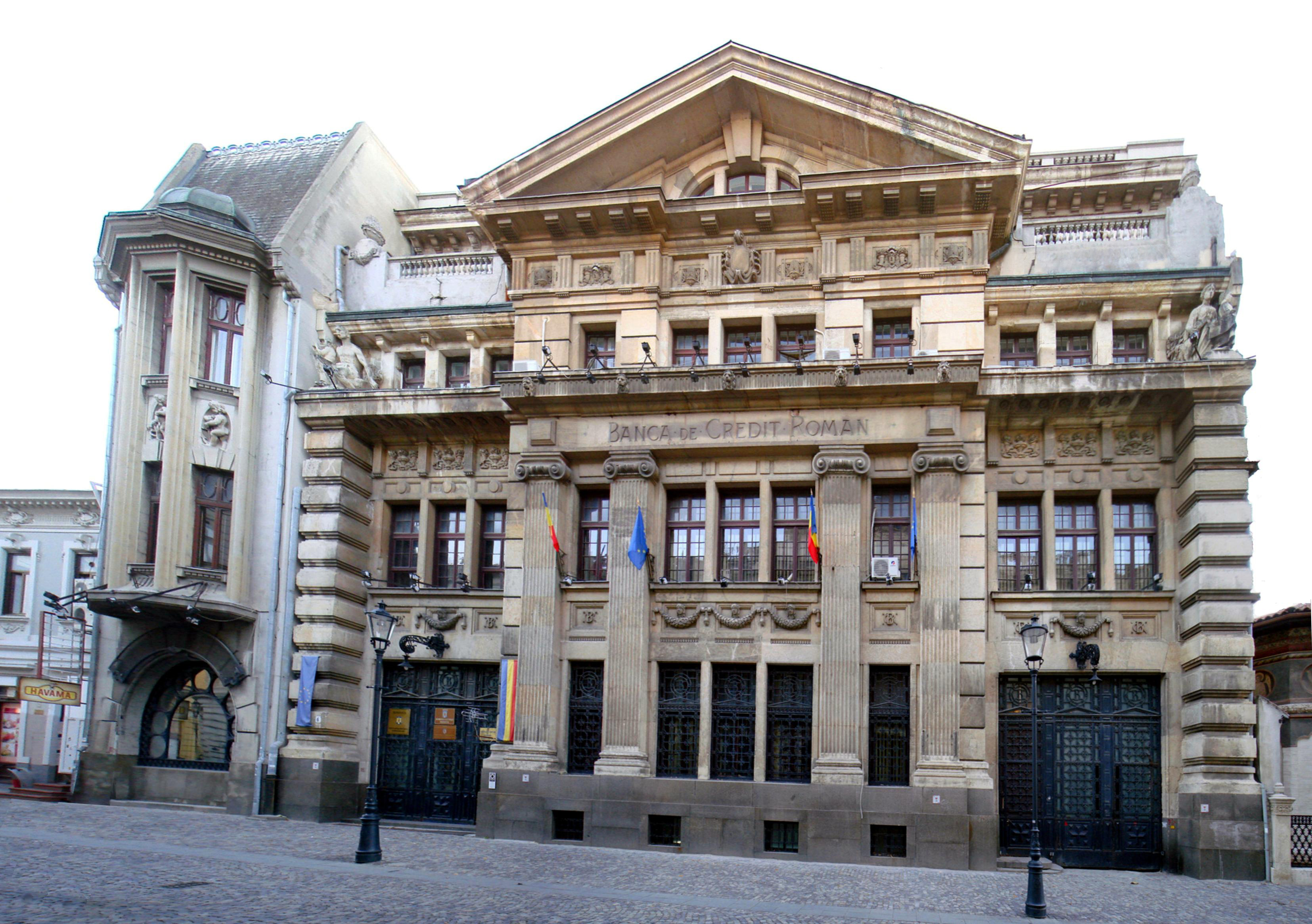
Banca de Credit Român, the bank's Romanian affiliate in the 1930s

In the financial turmoil that followed the end of World War I in Austria, the Länderbank was recapitalized by a group of French investors led by the Banque de Paris et des Pays-Bas, in liaison with the Bank of England. On 22 January 1922, a vote of its General Meeting transferred the bank's head office and board of directors from Vienna to Paris, at 12 rue de Castiglione, and it was renamed the Banque des Pays de l'Europe Centrale.

Its former branch in Prague became the Commercial & Industrial Bank (Czech: Banka pro obchod a průmysl, German: Bank für Handel und Industrie, French: Banque du Commerce et de l’Industrie), chaired by diplomat Jules Cambon. Its Galician affiliate was renamed Powszechny Bank Kredytowy (German: Allgemeine Kreditbank) in 1919, and moved its head office to Warsaw in 1926. In 1927, the Austrian branch changed its name from Zentraleuropäische Länderbank to Österreichische Länderbank. The French investors' support kept it strong enough to survive the crisis of 1929-1932 without Austrian government help, unlike most domestic banks including the Allgemeine Bodencreditanstalt, Creditanstalt, Niederösterreichische Escompte-Gesellschaft, and Wiener Bankverein. Even so, it had to suspend all dividend payments from 1930 to 1935. By 1936, 85 percent of the BPEC's business was made in Austria. That same year, the Powszechny Bank Kredytowy, of which it held 58 percent of the capital, was the ninth-largest private-sector bank in Poland. It also retained controlling interests in the Prague-based Commercial & Industrial Bank as well as the Hungarian Discount and Exchange Bank in Budapest and Banca de Credit Român (German: Rumänische Kreditbank) in Bucharest.

== Nazi era ==
Following the Nazi Anschluss in 1938, the Länderbank came under considerable financial and political pressure, and on 15 June 1938 agreed under duress to be acquired by Mercurbank, a Vienna-based bank established in 1870 which had come under majority control of Danatbank, then Dresdner Bank in 1931. The Prague-based Živnostenská Banka's Austrian subsidiary was simultaneously subsumed in the merged entity, renamed Länderbank Wien AG. The new Länderbank had 33 branch offices in Vienna (36 after acquisition of the Austrian business of Società Italiana di Credito in 1939), in comparison to 24 for the rival Creditanstalt-Bankverein. Later in 1938 following the Nazi annexation of the Sudetenland, it took over the former branches of the Böhmische Escompte-Bank in the South Moravian towns of Břeclav (German: Lundenburg), Mikulov (German: Nikolsburg) and Znojmo (German: Znaim). In subsequent years, most of the Länderbank's resources were used to finance the Nazi war effort.

== Postwar development ==
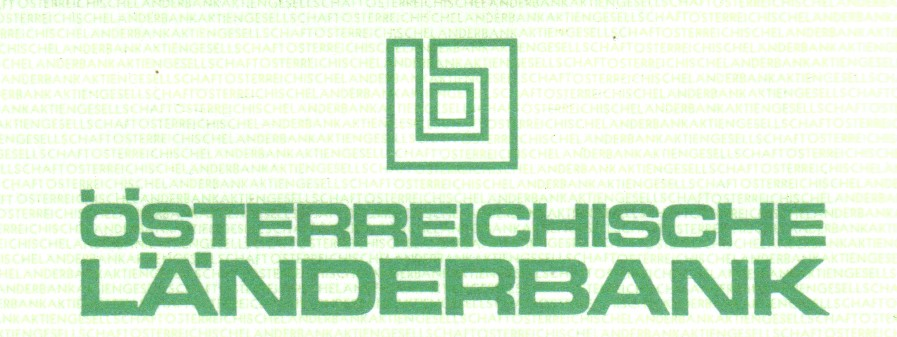
Former logo

The Länderbank was nationalized by law of 28 July 1946, in part to pre-empt impending confiscation by the Russian occupying forces as former German property. In the postwar period, it was widely viewed as belonging to the sphere of influence of the Social Democratic Party of Austria under Austria's Proporz arrangement. It long remained Austria's second-largest bank behind the Creditanstalt-Bankverein, associated with the Austrian People's Party. In 1956, the state floated 40 percent of its share capital for purchase by Austrian nationals. That same year, the Länderbank had 21 branches in Vienna and 12 in other Austrian cities, namely Baden bei Wien, Bludenz, Bregenz, Graz, Innsbruck, Klosterneuburg, Linz, Salzburg, Sankt Pölten, Villach, Wels, Wiener Neustadt, as well as a subsidiary in Eisenstadt. In 1976, the Länderbank again opened an office in London, followed by New York in 1977.

After the bank suffered from poor risk management in the late 1970s, future chancellor Franz Vranitzky led its recovery as chairman of its management board from 1981 to 1984, with the help of government subsidies. In 1985, it was the first Austrian bank to open an office in China. The state's ownership stake was reduced to 51 percent in 1988, through a capital increase open to foreign investors.

== Merger ==
In 1991, after facing renewed financial difficulty, the Länderbank, by then Austria's fourth-largest financial institution, merged with Vienna's Zentralsparkasse und Kommerzialbank Wien (est. 1905, also known as Z-Bank) which at the time was both sounder and larger. In practice, that represented a takeover by the City of Vienna, led by Zentralsparkasse general manager René Alfons Haiden who subsequently chaired the merged entity, renamed Bank Austria, until 1995. Bank Austria was acquired by HypoVereinsbank in 2001, which in turn was purchased by UniCredit in 2005.

== Buildings ==
The Länderbank had its first temporary offices in a commercial building at Löwelstrasse 18 (which later became the seat of the Social Democratic Party of Austria). It erected its own head office in 1883–1884 on plans by famed Viennese architect Otto Wagner, on the site of a former armory. That work has been described as Vienna's first modern office building. The Länderbank remained there from 1884 until 1938, after which the building became a German military facility. Following the merger with Mercurbank, the Länderbank moved into the former head office of Niederösterreichische Escompte-Gesellschaft, am Hof 2, which in 1991 became the head office of Bank Austria.

The Länderbank's Hungarian affiliate (Ungarische Landesbank) was established in Pest, initially at Palatingasse (now Nador Utca) 9, then in a purpose-built head office nearby at No. 4 of the same street, designed by architect Adolf Feszty with metalwork by Gyula Jungfer. That building later became the Budapest office of Wiener Bankverein.

The Länderbank's Prague branch erected a prominent building in 1906 on Náměstí Republiky, more recently branded Konektor Place.

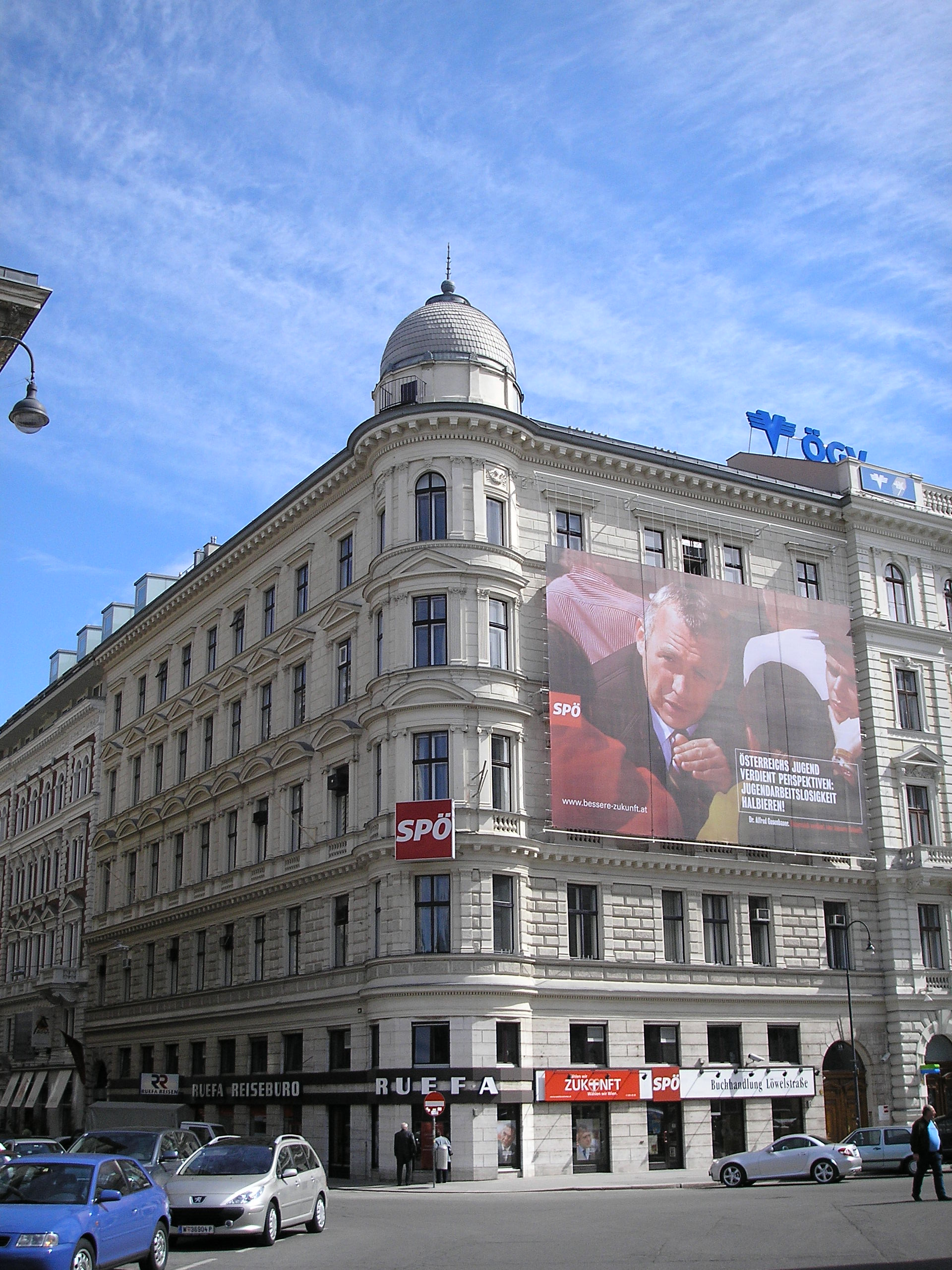
Building at Löwelstrasse 18, the Länderbank's first temporary offices

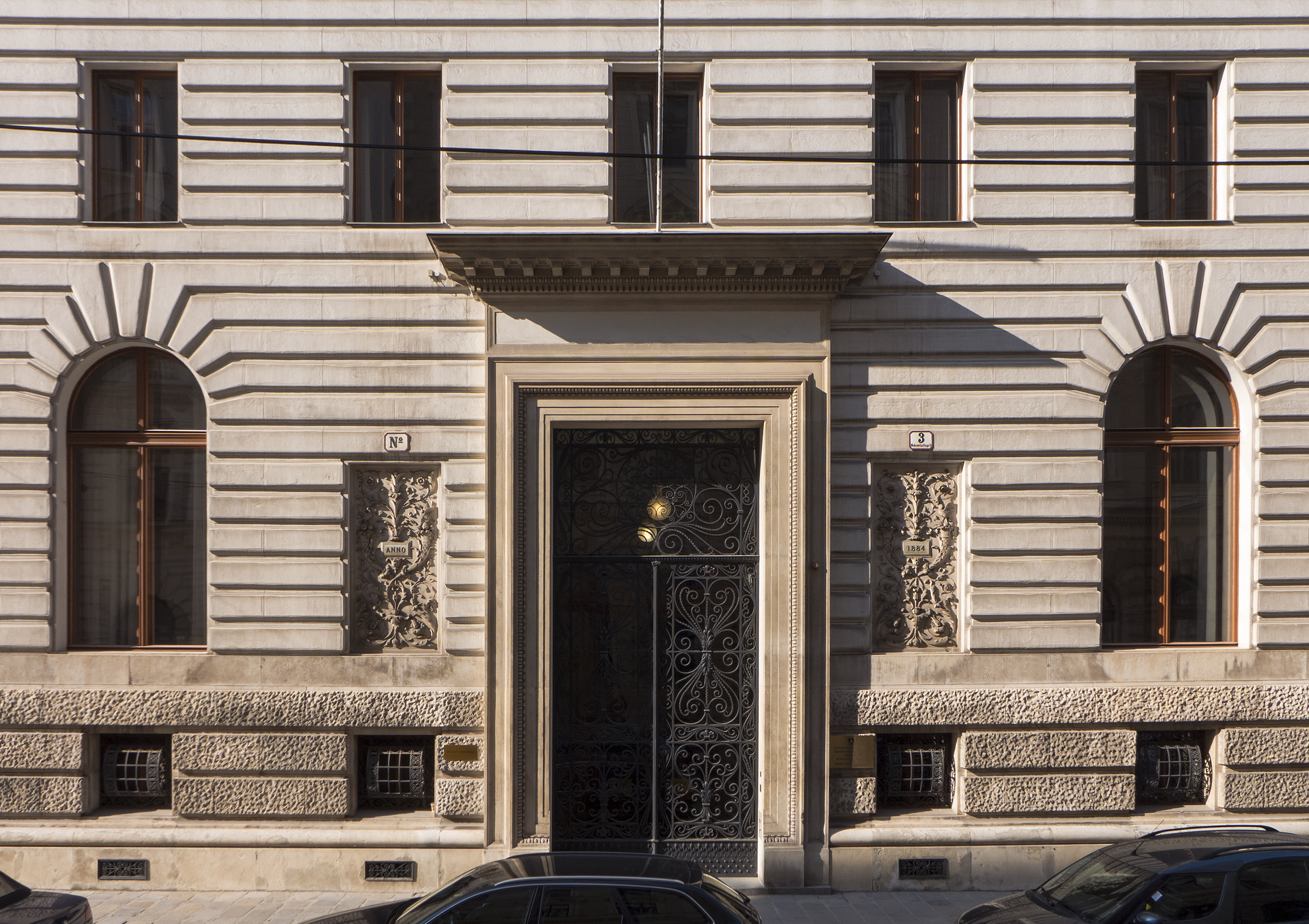
Entrance on the head office designed by Otto Wagner on Hohenstaufengasse

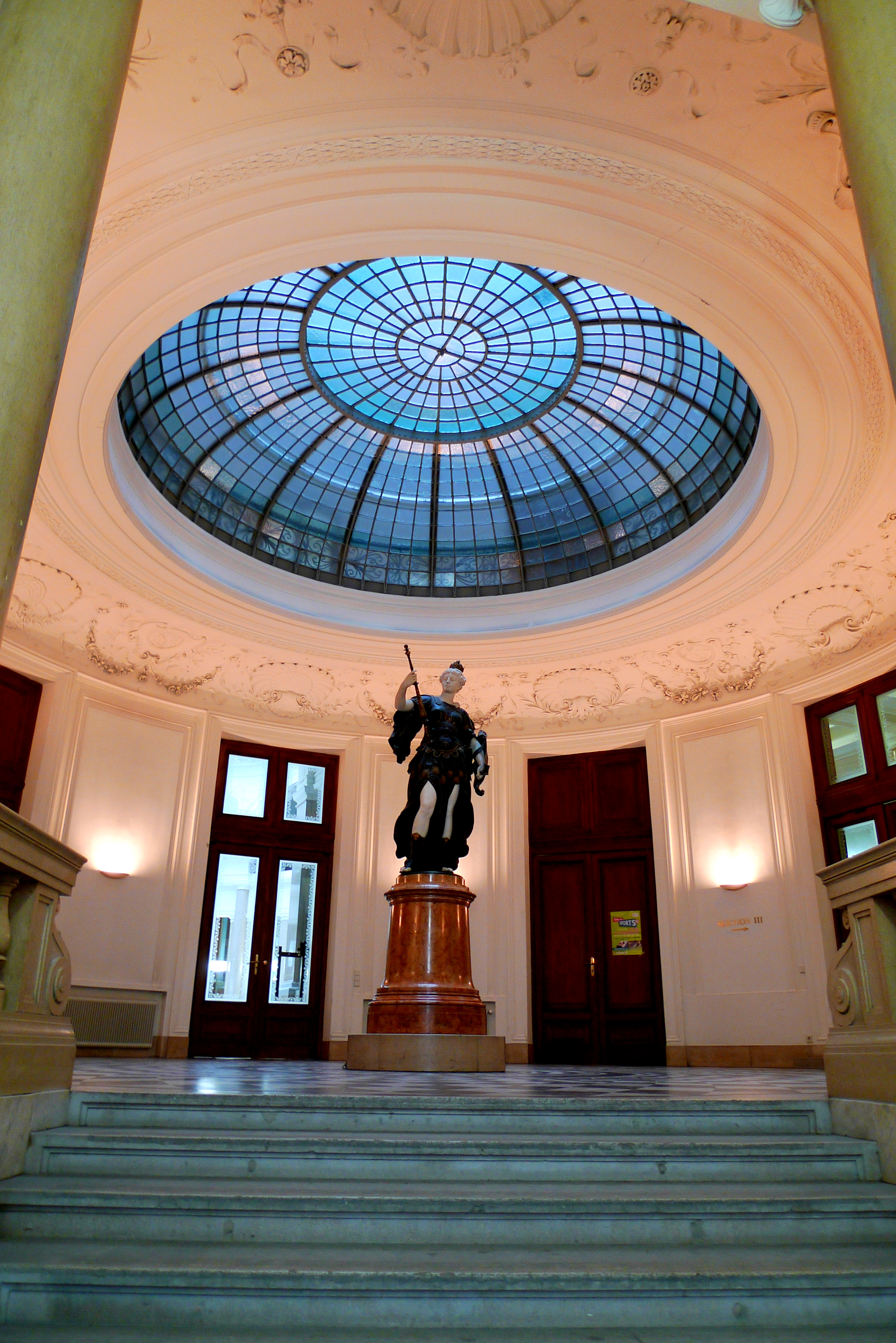
Entrance lobby, Hohenstaufengasse head office

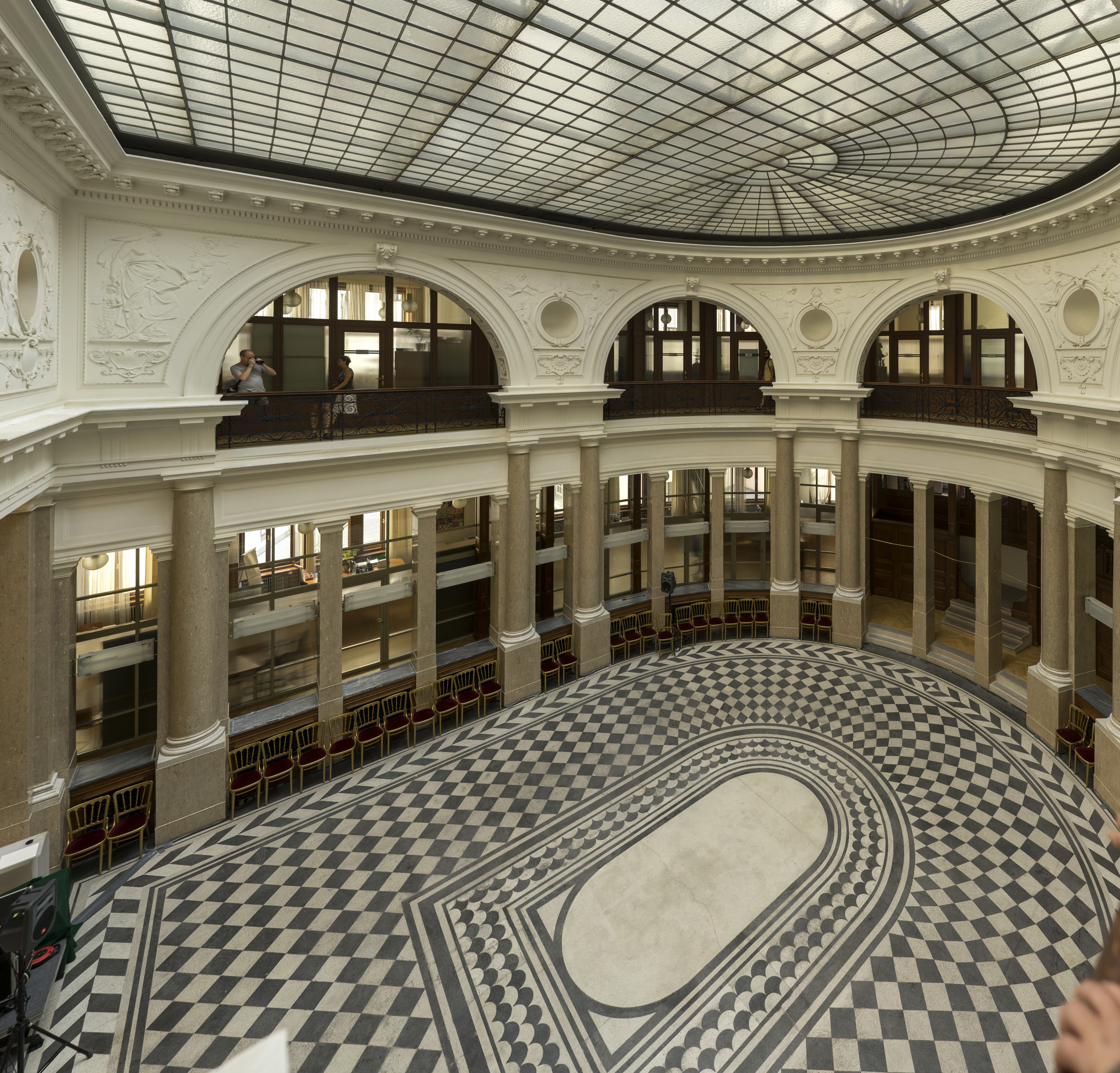
Main hall, Hohenstaufengasse head office

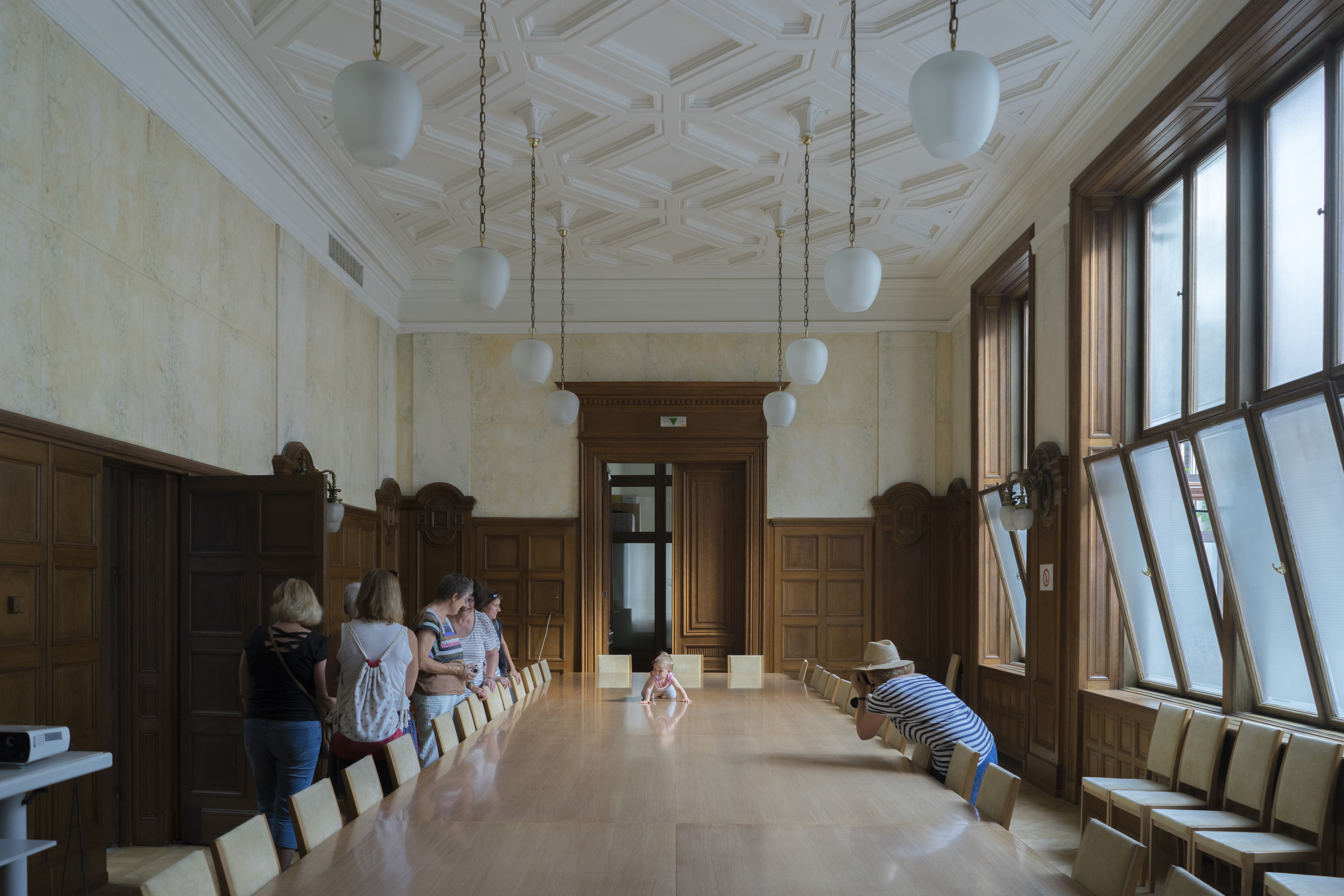
Former board room, Hohenstaufengasse head office

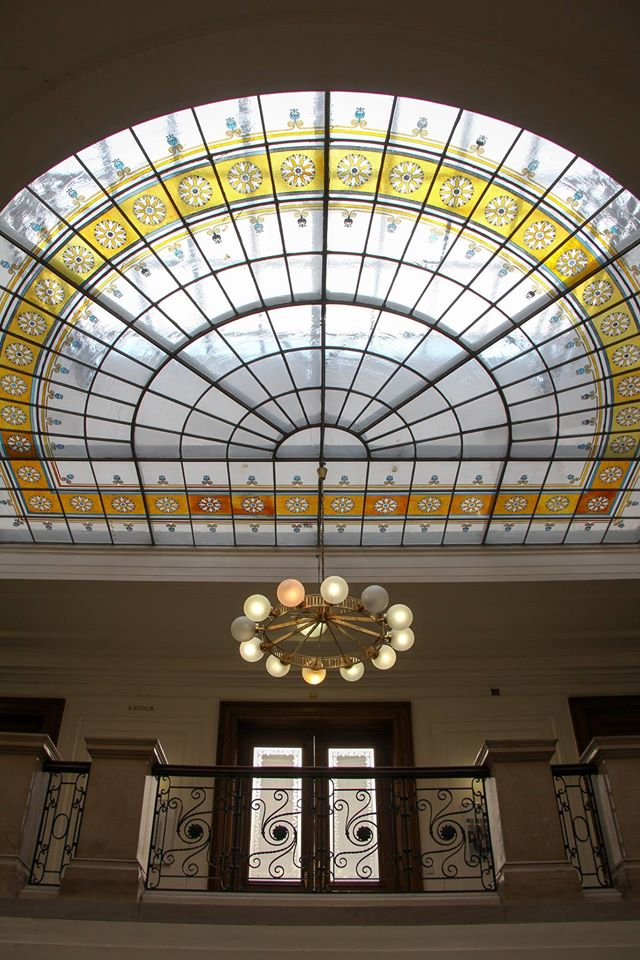
Colored glass ceiling, Hohenstaufengasse head office

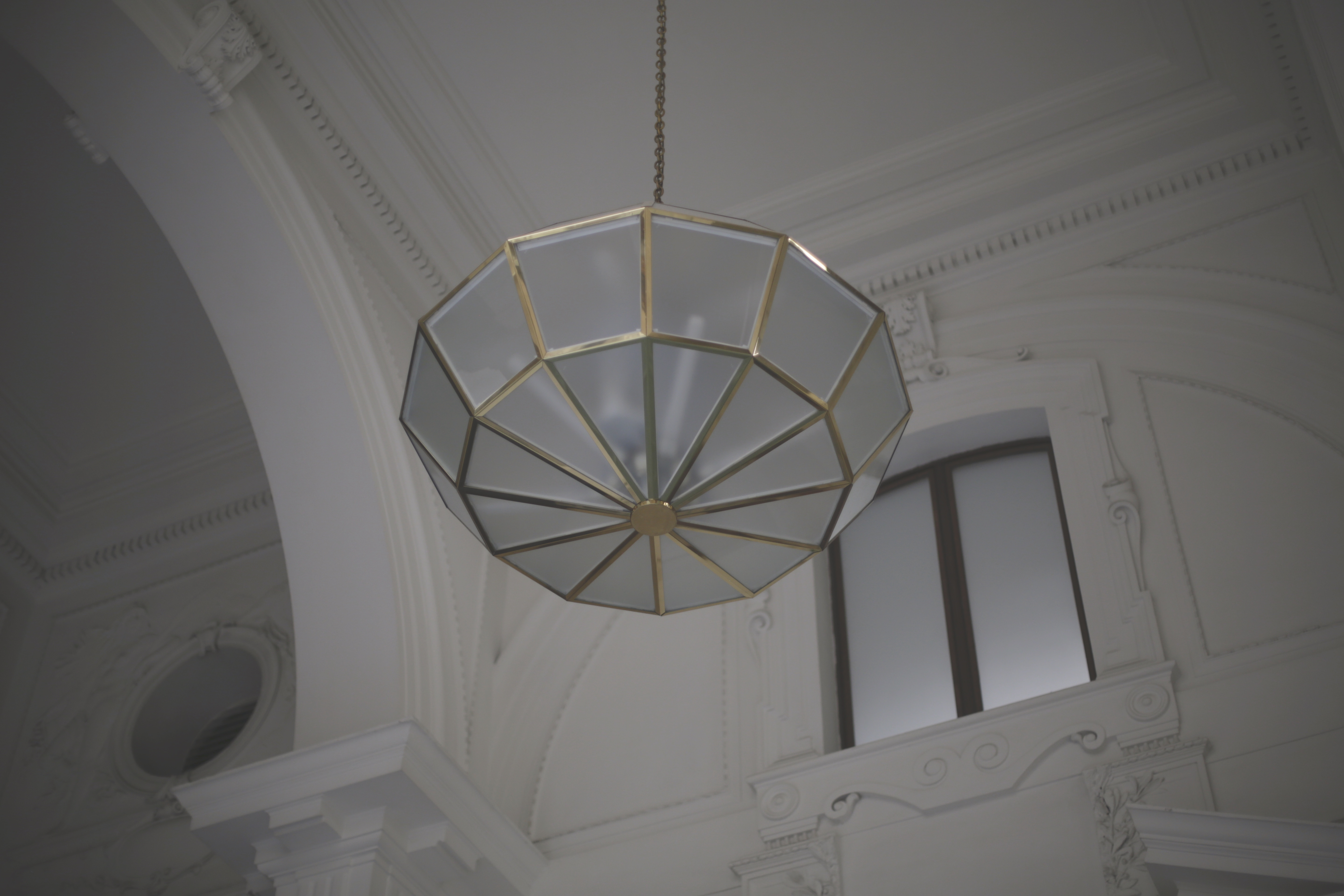
detail of lamp, Hohenstaufengasse head office

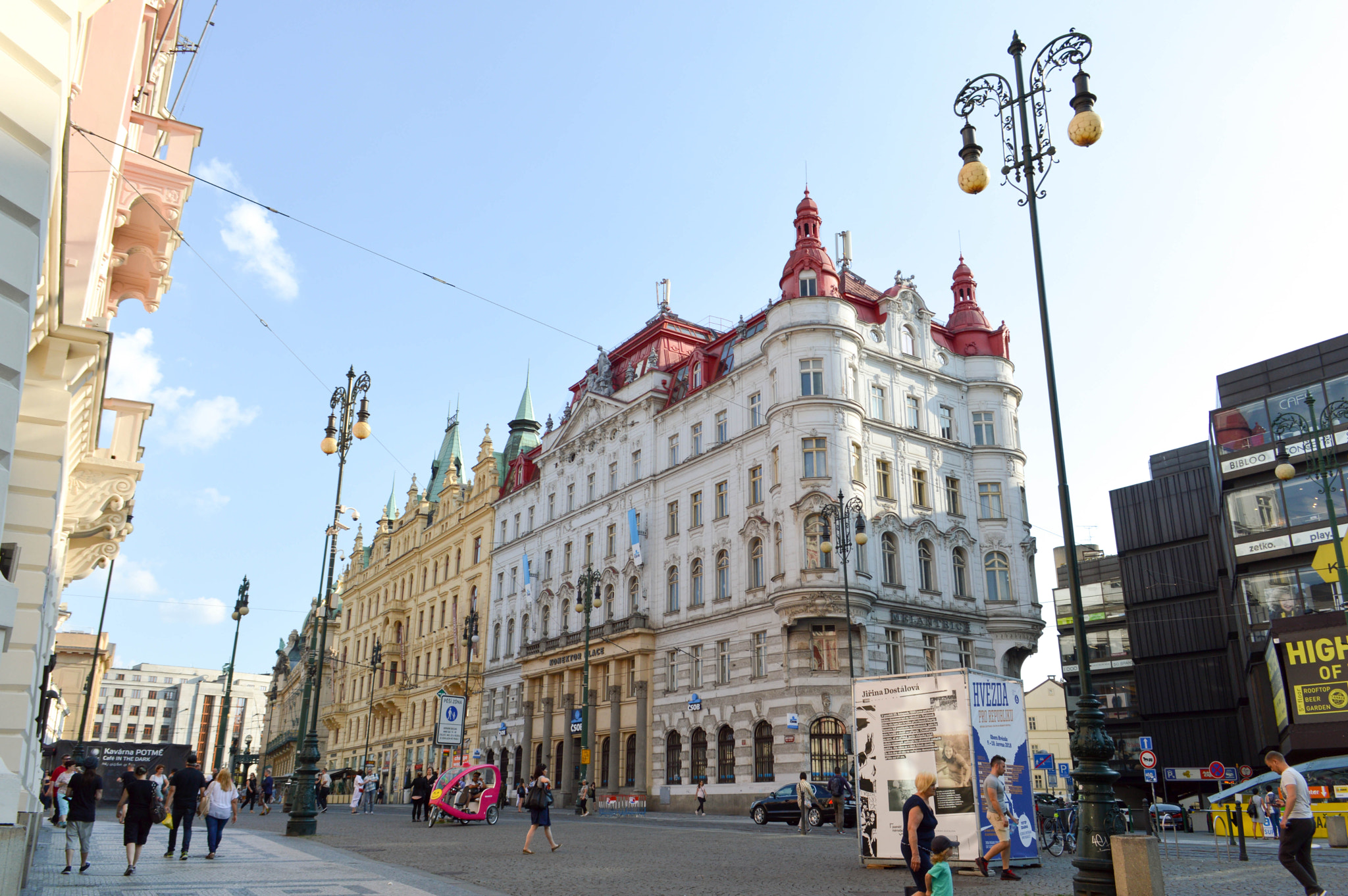
Former branch office on Náměstí Republiky, Prague (center)

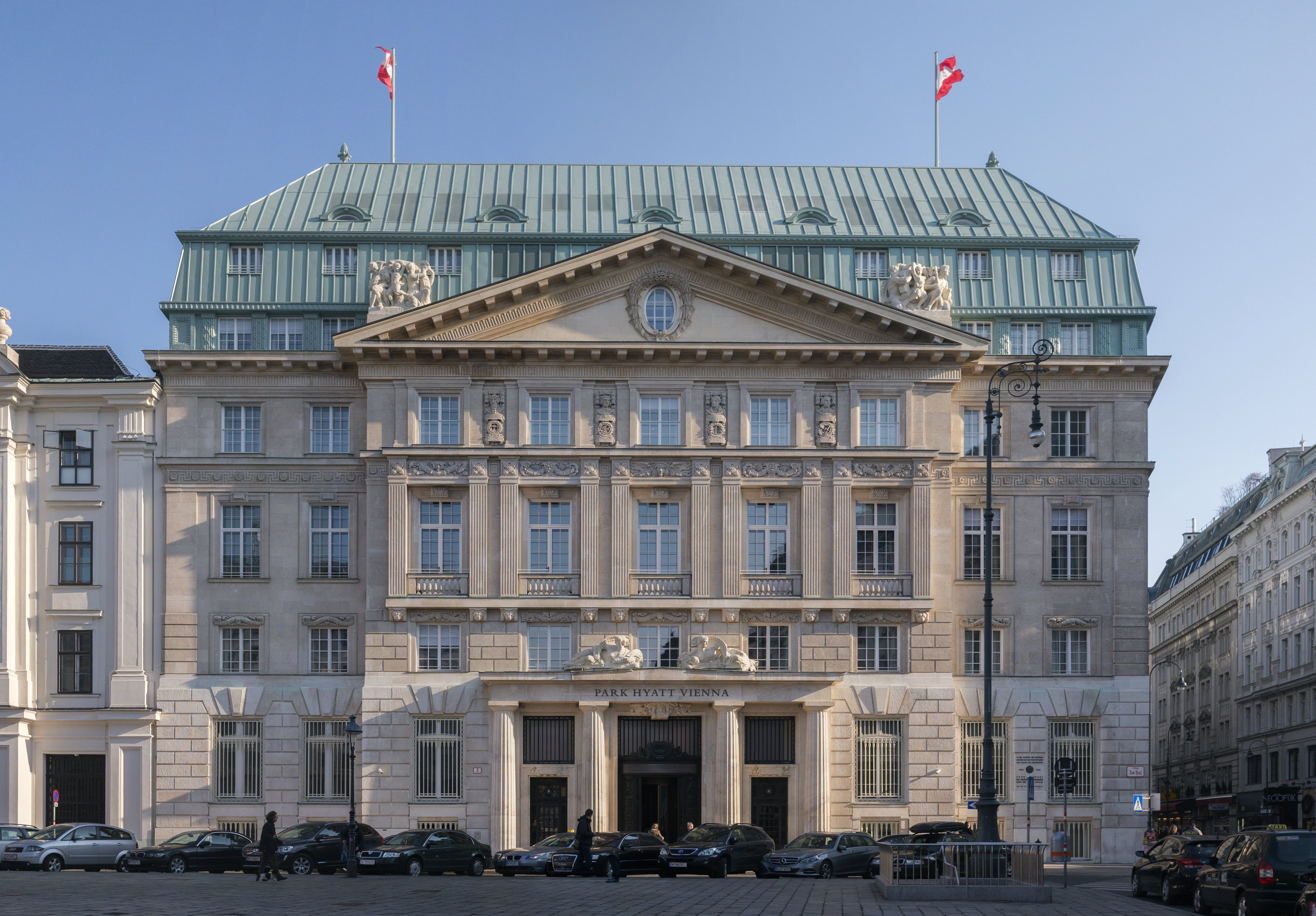
Building am Hof 2, head office of the Länderbank (1938-1991) then of Bank Austria (1991-2002)

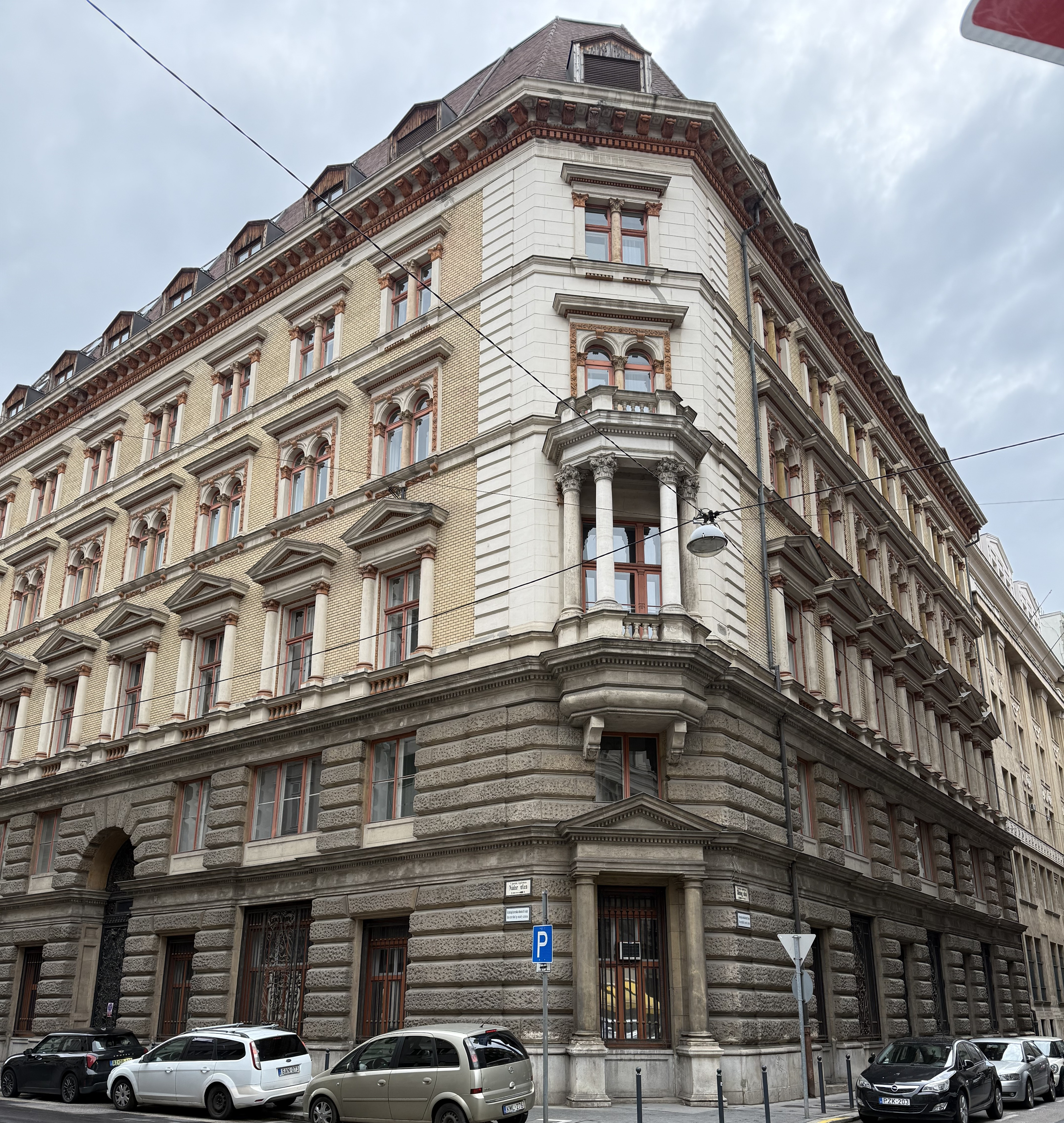
Former Hungarian branch building, Nádor utca 4 in Budapest

== See also ==
- Creditanstalt
- Wiener Bankverein
- Erste Group
- List of banks in Austria
