= Nové Dvory =

Nové Dvory may refer to places in the Czech Republic:

- Nové Dvory (Kutná Hora District), a market town in the Central Bohemian Region
- Nové Dvory (Litoměřice District), a municipality and village in the Ústí nad Labem Region
- Nové Dvory (Příbram District), a municipality and village in the Central Bohemian Region
- Nové Dvory (Žďár nad Sázavou District), a municipality and village in the Vysočina Region
- Nové Dvory, a village and part of Bystřany in the Ústí nad Labem Region
- Nové Dvory, a village and part of Červený Újezd (Benešov District) in the Central Bohemian Region
- Nové Dvory, a village and part of Dolní Hořice in the South Bohemian Region
- Nové Dvory, a village and part of Lážovice in the Central Bohemian Region
- Nové Dvory, a village and part of Lomnice nad Popelkou in the Liberec Region
- Nové Dvory, a village and part of Miličín in the Central Bohemian Region
- Nové Dvory, a village and part of Močerady in the Plzeň Region
- Nové Dvory, a village and part of Opařany in the South Bohemian Region
- Nové Dvory, a village and part of Polná in the Vysočina Region
- Nové Dvory, a village and part of Sedlec-Prčice in the Central Bohemian Region
- Nové Dvory, a village and part of Staré Hobzí in the South Bohemian Region
- Nové Dvory, a town part of Třebíč in the Vysočina Region
- Nové Dvory, a village and part of Vavřinec (Blansko District) in the South Moravian Region
- Lipník nad Bečvou III-Nové Dvory, a village and part of Lipník nad Bečvou in the Olomouc Region

== See also ==
- Nový Dvůr (disambiguation)
