= Nový Dvůr =

Nový Dvůr may refer to places in the Czech Republic:

- Nový Dvůr (Nymburk District), a municipality and village in the Central Bohemian Region
- Nový Dvůr Monastery in the Karlovy Vary Region
- Nový Dvůr, a village and part of Bor (Tachov District) in the Plzeň Region
- Nový Dvůr, a village and part of Chrášťany (Rakovník District) in the Central Bohemian Region
- Nový Dvůr, a village and part of Číhaň in the Plzeň Region
- Nový Dvůr, a village and part of Hořičky in the Hradec Králové Region
- Nový Dvůr, a village and part of Jaroměřice in the Pardubice Region
- Nový Dvůr, a village and part of Kámen (Pelhřimov District) in the Vysočina Region
- Nový Dvůr, a village and part of Kout na Šumavě in the Plzeň Region
- Nový Dvůr, a village and part of Myslív in the Plzeň Region
- Nový Dvůr, a village and part of Nová Ves u Chotěboře in the Vysočina Region
- Nový Dvůr, a village and part of Písek in the South Bohemian Region
- Nový Dvůr, a village and part of Podhořany u Ronova in the Pardubice Region
- Nový Dvůr, a village and part of Řeřichy in the Central Bohemian Region
- Nový Dvůr, a village and part of Stěbořice in the Moravian-Silesian Region
  - Nový Dvůr Arboretum
- Nový Dvůr, a village and part of Veverská Bítýška in the South Moravian Region
- Nový Dvůr, a village and part of Zdíkov in the South Bohemian Region
- Nový Dvůr, a village and part of Žihle in the Plzeň Region

== See also ==
- Nové Dvory (disambiguation)
