= Karel Engliš =

Czech economist

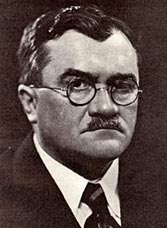
- Born: 17 August 1880; Hrabyně, Austrian Silesia, Austria-Hungary
- Died: 15 June 1961 (aged 80); Hrabyně, Czechoslovakia
- Occupations: Economist, political scientist

Karel Engliš (17 August 1880 – 13 June 1961) was a Czech economist, political scientist, and founder of teleological economic theory.

Engliš was the first rector of Masaryk University in Brno from 1919 to 1920, and from 1947 to 1948 was rector of Charles University in Prague. Together with Alois Rašín, he was significantly involved in the Czechoslovak currency reform after World War I as Minister of Finance. From 1934 to 1938, he was Governor of the National Bank of Czechoslovakia.

== Life ==
Born in Hrabyně into a butcher family, Engliš studied in poverty. He graduated from the Czech grammar school in Opava and then continued his studies at the Faculty of Law of Charles-Ferdinand University in Prague, where he graduated in 1904. One of his teachers was economist Albín Bráf, who recognized his talent and recommended him for work at the Provincial Statistical Office. From there, he transferred to the Ministry of Trade in Vienna in 1908. In 1910 he habilitated to associate professor of economics at the Czech Technology in Brno. In 1911, he became an extraordinary professor, and a full professor in 1917. From 1913 to 1914, he was Dean of the Department of Cultural Engineering, and Dean of the Department of Chemical Engineering from 1917 to 1918.

In 1913–1918 he was a member of the Moravian Diet for the progressive party of Adolf Stránský. From 1918–1925 he was a member of the National Democratic Party (CND) and in 1920–1925 he was a member of the National Assembly, as well as chairman of the Moravian-Silesian Executive Committee of the CND. In 1915 he wrote contributions to Masaryk's Our Time. On 2 September 1925, he resigned from the CND, then participated in the establishment of the National Labor Party, which he refused to join.

Together with Alois Rašín, he played a significant role in the monetary reform of post-WWI Czechoslovakia, but was a strong opponent of Rašín's deflationary policy. Engliš served as Minister of Finance in six governments, from 1920–1931, and then in 1934–1939 as Governor of the National Bank of Czechoslovakia. He was responsible for stabilizing the currency, streamlining the state budget, building a modern tax system, overcoming post-war economic upheaval, and mitigating the effects of the Great Depression in the 1930s. He was also mainly responsible for the merger of the Anglo-Czechoslovak Bank with the Prague Credit Bank in 1929. The aim was to create a solid financial institution that could compete with the most substantial bank in Czechoslovakia, the Živnostenská Banka. The merger was completed in early 1930 but did not fulfill Engliš's expectations due to the economic crisis.

In 1919, he became a professor and the first rector of the newly founded Masaryk University in Brno, which he participated in founding together with František Weyr and Alois Jirásek. He was a professor of national economy at the university's Faculty of Law and, in 1921–1922 and 1925–1926, also its dean. He founded the teleological school of national economics, which deals with assessing the purposefulness of the behavior of all economic entities. His merits in the field of national economy were recognized by membership in the Czech Academy of Sciences and Arts; he became an extraordinary member on 19 March 1927, and a full member on 9 April 1946. Since its inception in 1929, he was also a member of the Czechoslovak Statistical Society. After the Munich Agreement on 1 October 1938, he succeeded in initiating the transport of the remains of Karel Hynek Mácha from Litoměřice, which was annexed by Germany.

From 1947 to 1948, he was Rector of Charles University. After the coup d'état in February 1948, he surrendered all his university positions and was forced to withdraw from public life. In August 1952, he had to move out of Prague due to administrative persecution, but he managed to obtain the authorities' consent to return to his hometown Hrabyně. In the last years of his life, he was the target of several restrictive measures in his personal life, his work was heavily criticized by communist propaganda, and his writings were banned and expelled from public libraries. He faced persistent scrutiny by the communist government consisting mainly of house searches, and his originally high pension was drastically reduced several times to the absolute minimum. Despite the difficult conditions, he devoted himself to his scientific work. He focused mainly on logic, national economy, polemics of the two previous fields, and writing memoirs. Most of his work remained in manuscripts, and even after 1989 only a few titles from the period were published. He died after years of hardship in modest circumstances with only the support of family and close friends.

== Personal life ==
On 5 June 1906, Engliš married Maria Grögrová (1880–1953), the daughter of a tax inspector from Uherský Brod, in Prague. On 21 April 1907, their daughter Vlasta (1907–2001) was born and later married Brno architect František Plhoně. Engliš and Grögrová later had a daughter Věra (1908–1990) and a son Karel (1912–1991). At the time of his wedding and the birth of his children, he was a draftsman of the Provincial Statistical Office. The couple was legally divorced in 1919 and separated in 1921. Engliš married a second time, to Valeria Sovová (1884–1964) in a civil marriage on 12 June 1921 in Brno. (Note: A September 1929 edition of Pestrý týden presents a photograph of Engliš with his second wife Valeria.)

== Theoretical work ==
In addition to public activity, his theoretical work was also significant. He gradually became one of the most influential theorists of interwar Czechoslovakia. Unlike other economic theorists, he had the opportunity to verify his scientific conclusions in practice and possibly revise them. As a teacher, he influenced two generations of Czech economists and founded the so-called Brno School of Economics.

He began his scientific work before the First World War in the field of social policy. His work at university led him to the need for theoretical mastery of all economics and the development of the concept of economic knowledge. The concept is based on marginal utility theory, counter to the then-prevailing causal interpretation of economic issues. He was inspired by the method of economic cognition, so-called teleological theory, from the Vienna school of economics, of which he was a follower (similar to Rašín under the influence of Bráf). According to Engliš, economics is the science of order, where individuals and entire nations try to maintain and improve their lives. Organization in the economy is based on purposeful thinking. The peak of his theoretical work is the two-volume System of the national economy. In this extensive work (approximately 1,700 pages in total) he summarized his economic teachings.

In his theoretical work, he was influenced mainly by neo-Kantianism and was inspired by the normative theory of Hans Kelsen. He analyzed the teleological way of cognition and thinking because he believed human action is always done for some purpose. Engliš held that in any economic system, all subjects always try to improve their existence, so he rejected simple causality in the economy. He thought that in individualistic (capitalist) systems, everyone decides on the satisfaction of their own needs, but in solidaristic (socialist) systems it is a matter of caring for another, foreign subject, who cannot have such a good overview. In practice, he believed there are always mixed systems. Engliš himself did not support a controlled economy, and saw its justification only in temporary critical situations.

Although he worked closely with Rašín, he differed significantly in many respects. Engliš criticized his deflationary policy, persistent efforts to strengthen the Czech koruna, and insistence on the gold standard. His reasoning included the observation that between 1921 and 1923, the price level fell by 43%, exports fell by 53%, and unemployment rose from 72 to 207 thousand people. Although the deflationary policy was revoked by parliament in 1925, the leadership of the National Bank continued to insist on it, even though during the economic crisis, the price of gold rose sharply, and with it, the koruna exchange rate. Between 1930 and 1933, the price level decreased by 19%, but exports fell by 64%, and unemployment rose from 105 to 736 thousand people. It was not until 1934 that Engliš was able to enforce the devaluation of the koruna by 16%, which was not enough.

He was characterized by extensive debates with opponents, where he exhaustively analyzed all arguments and counter-arguments. As a lecturer, he enriched his speeches with deep practical excursions. In 1991, President Václav Havel awarded him the Order of Tomáš Garrigue Masaryk, Class III in memoriam for "outstanding services to democracy and human rights".

== Legacy ==
In 1990, the Karel Engliš Society was founded in Prague, and in 1994 the Karel Engliš Prize was established by Masaryk University in Brno, awarded annually to a prominent economist.

Every year, the Rector of Charles University awards the Prof. JUDr. Karel Engliš Prize as one of the types of Rector's Prizes for the best social science graduates.

The former Karel Engliš University in Brno bore his name, and streets in Smíchov, Prague and Opava are named after him.

In 2022, the Czech National Bank issued a commemorative banknote featuring a portrait of Engliš, with a nominal value of CZK 100.

== Works ==
- Základy hospodářského myšlení ('Basics of economic thinking'). Brno: Barvič & Novotný, 1922.
- Vybrané kapitoly z národního hospodářství ('Selected chapters from the national economy'). Prague: State Publishing House, 1925.
- Finanční věda: nástin theorie hospodářství veřejných svazků ('Financial science: an outline of the theory of public unions'). Prague: Fr. Borový, 1929.
- Teleologie jako forma vědeckého poznání ('Teleology as a form of scientific knowledge'). Prague: F. Topič, 1930.
- Ekonomie a filosofie ('Economics and philosophy'). Prague: Fr. Borový, 1931.
- O nouzi v nadbytku ('In need of excess'). Prague: Fr. Borový, 1935.
- Soustava národního hospodářství: Věda o pořádku, v kterém jednotlivci a národové pečují o udržení a zlepšení života ('System of the national economy: The science of the order in which individuals and nations care for the maintenance and improvement of life'). 2 Volumes. Prague: Melantrich, 1938.
- Národní hospodářství pro účely nejvyšších stupňů středních škol ('National economy for the purposes of the highest levels of secondary schools'). Prague: Orbis, 1940.
- Hospodářské soustavy ('Economic systems'). Prague: Všehrd, 1946.
- Malá logika: věda o myšlenkovém řádu ('Little logic: the science of the order of thought'). Prague: Melantrich, 1947.
- Věčné ideály lidstva ('Eternal ideals of humanity'). Prague: Vyšehrad, 1992. (From Engliš's estate, completed on January 28, 1956.)
- Hrabyň mého mládí ('Countess of my youth'). Opava: Matice slezská, 1999. ISBN 80-238-3394-4. 2nd edition, Opava: Matice slezská, 2010. ISBN 978-80-86887-15-9.
