= Jaroslav Kabeš =

Czechoslovak communist politician and economist

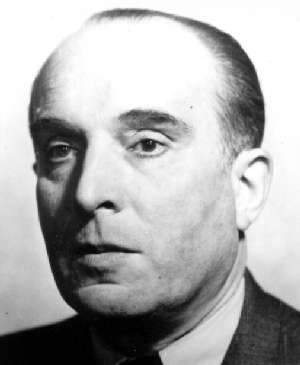

Minister of Finance
- Preceded by: Jaromír Dolanský
- Succeeded by: Július Ďuriš

Director of the National Bank of Czechoslovakia
- In office February 1953 – August 1957
- Preceded by: Otokar Pohl
- Succeeded by: Otokar Pohl

Personal details
- Born: 18 June 1896 Tábor, Bohemia, Austria-Hungary
- Died: 15 August 1964 (aged 68) Prague, Czechoslovakia
- Party: Communist Party of Czechoslovakia
- Profession: Economist, banker
- Awards: Order of the Republic

Jaroslav Kabeš (18 June 1896 – 15 August 1964) was a Czechoslovak economist and politician who served as Minister of Finance and Director of the National Bank of Czechoslovakia. Kabeš had also written works of philosophy, poetry and translations.

== Biography ==
Kabeš attended high school and commercial academy in Chrudim from 1907 to 1914. During World War I he served in Italy and Russia. He then worked for various banks, including the Agrarian Bank (Agrární banka). Kabeš was one of the founding members of the Communist Party of Czechoslovakia in 1921. He took part in the party's illegal work in the Protectorate of Bohemia and Moravia.

From 1946 to 1954 he was a member of the Central Committee of the CPC, then until 1962 a member of the Central Revision and Control Commission of the CPC Central Committee.

As early as September 1945, Kabeš was appointed General Manager of the Agricultural Bank (Zemědělská banka, formerly Agrarian Bank), in October 1946 first deputy director of the Živnostenská Banka and at the same time was in the administration and on the bank council of the National Bank of Czechoslovakia. From 1953 to 1957, Kabeš was Director General of the State Bank of Czechoslovakia.

In the governments of Antonín Zápotocký and Viliam Široký, Kabeš held the post of Minister of Finance from April 4, 1949 to September 14, 1953 and as such was largely responsible for the preparation and implementation of the currency reform in 1953.

In 1961 Kabeš received the Order of the Republic.

== Works ==
From 1925 to 1926, in the journal Komunistická revue, he published an essay on the philosophical development of the young Karl Marx (pseud. "J. Tábor, Filosofický vývoj mladého K. Marxe"), which reflected the process of "return to Marx" that took place in the ideology of the Czech labor movement influenced by the Great October Socialist Revolution. At the same time, he criticized the philosophical views of Tomáš Masaryk (“Socialismus a Masaryk”).

Already in 1926, he wrote about the need to distinguish between bourgeois democracy and fascist dictatorship in order to successfully organise the working class against them ("Kolem fašismu", 1926).

In the 1930s he published and commented on the philosophical writings of Ladislav Klíma (Ladislava Klímy filosofie češství, 1939, published in 1945), interpreted the works of the sculptor František Bílek (Bílek myslitel, 1942) and the poet Otokar Březina.

Kabeś engaged in translation activities (focusing on Marxist philosophy). He translated into Czech a number of works by Marx (K. Marx, O kapitálu a jeho krisích, 1935; under the pseudonym J. Lirba), Hegel (“Introduction to the History of Philosophy”; manuscript), Lao Tzu (“Moudrost a tajemství, Setkání s Lao-tsem", sv. 1-2, 1944-1945) and published several collections of his poems ("Noc na hoře Oliv - Hlas hořícího keře", 1943, "Budova časů", 1945).
