= Hrabyně =

- Municipality
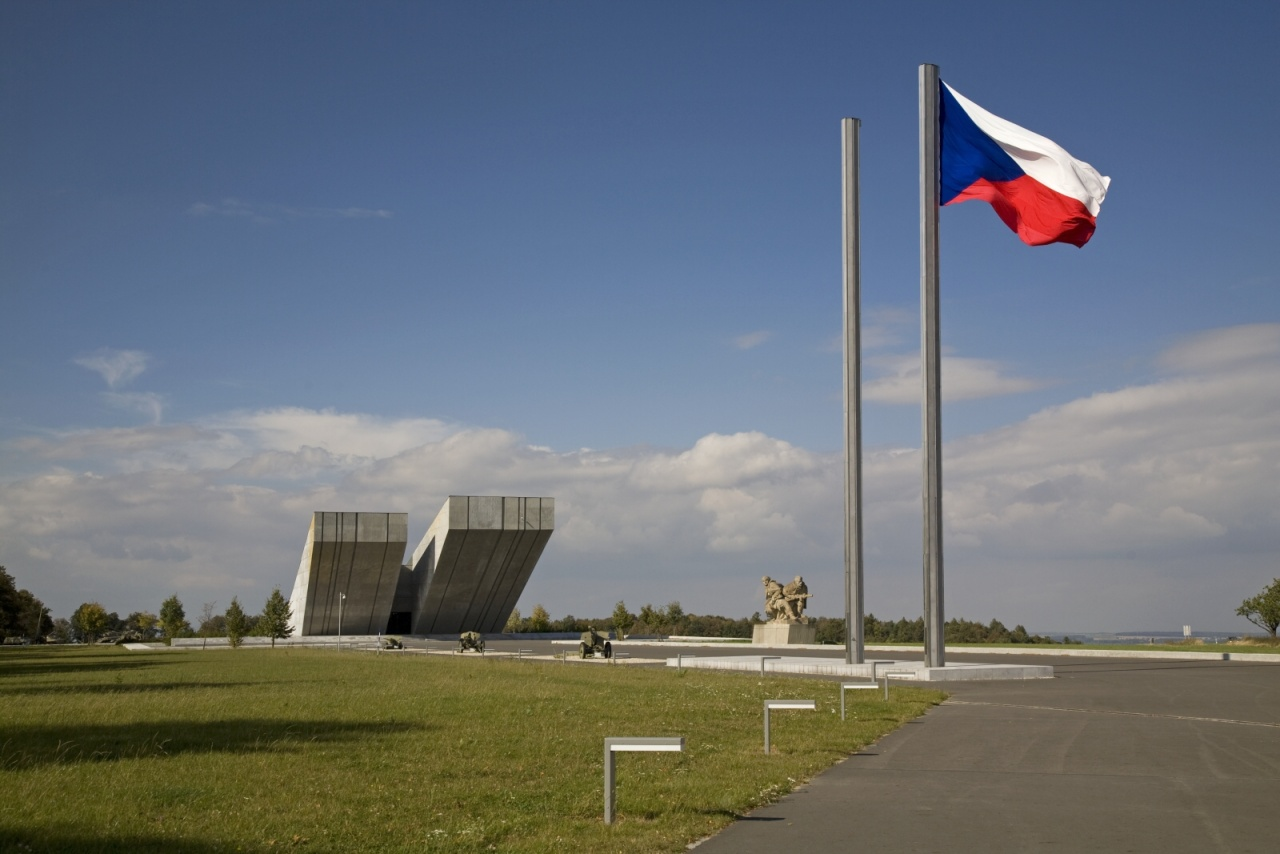
- World War II Memorial

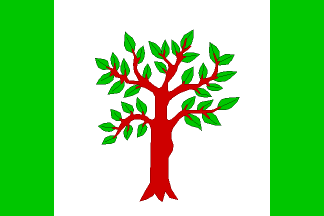
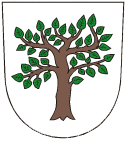
- Flag Coat of arms

- Location in the Czech Republic
- Coordinates: 49°52′57″N 18°3′18″E
- Country: Czech Republic
- Region: Moravian-Silesian
- District: Opava
- First mentioned: 1377

Area
  - Total: 10.03 km^{2} (3.87 sq mi)
- Elevation: 363 m (1,191 ft)

Population (2026-01-01)
  - Total: 1,083
  - Density: 108.0/km^{2} (279.7/sq mi)
- Time zone: UTC+1 (CET)
  - Summer (DST): UTC+2 (CEST)
- Postal code: 747 63
- Website: www.hrabyne.cz

Hrabyně (German: Hrabin) is a municipality and village in Opava District in the Moravian-Silesian Region of the Czech Republic. It has about 1,100 inhabitants.

== Administrative division ==
Hrabyně consists of two municipal parts (in brackets population according to the 2021 census):

- Hrabyně (1,097)
- Josefovice (121)

== Geography ==
Hrabyně is located about 12 kilometres (7 mi) southeast of Opava and 12 km (7 mi) northwest of Ostrava. It lies in the Nízký Jeseník range. The highest point is at 401 m (1,316 ft) above sea level.

== History ==
The first written mention of Hrabyně is from 1377, when it was a part of the Duchy of Troppau.

== Demographics ==
Historical population

Year	Pop.	±%
1869	932	—
1880	949	+1.8%
1890	853	−10.1%
1900	936	+9.7%
1910	925	−1.2%

Year	Pop.	±%
1921	907	−1.9%
1930	874	−3.6%
1950	634	−27.5%
1961	700	+10.4%
1970	659	−5.9%

Year	Pop.	±%
1980	1,224	+85.7%
1991	1,173	−4.2%
2001	1,201	+2.4%
2011	1,200	−0.1%
2021	1,218	+1.5%

Source: Censuses

== Economy ==
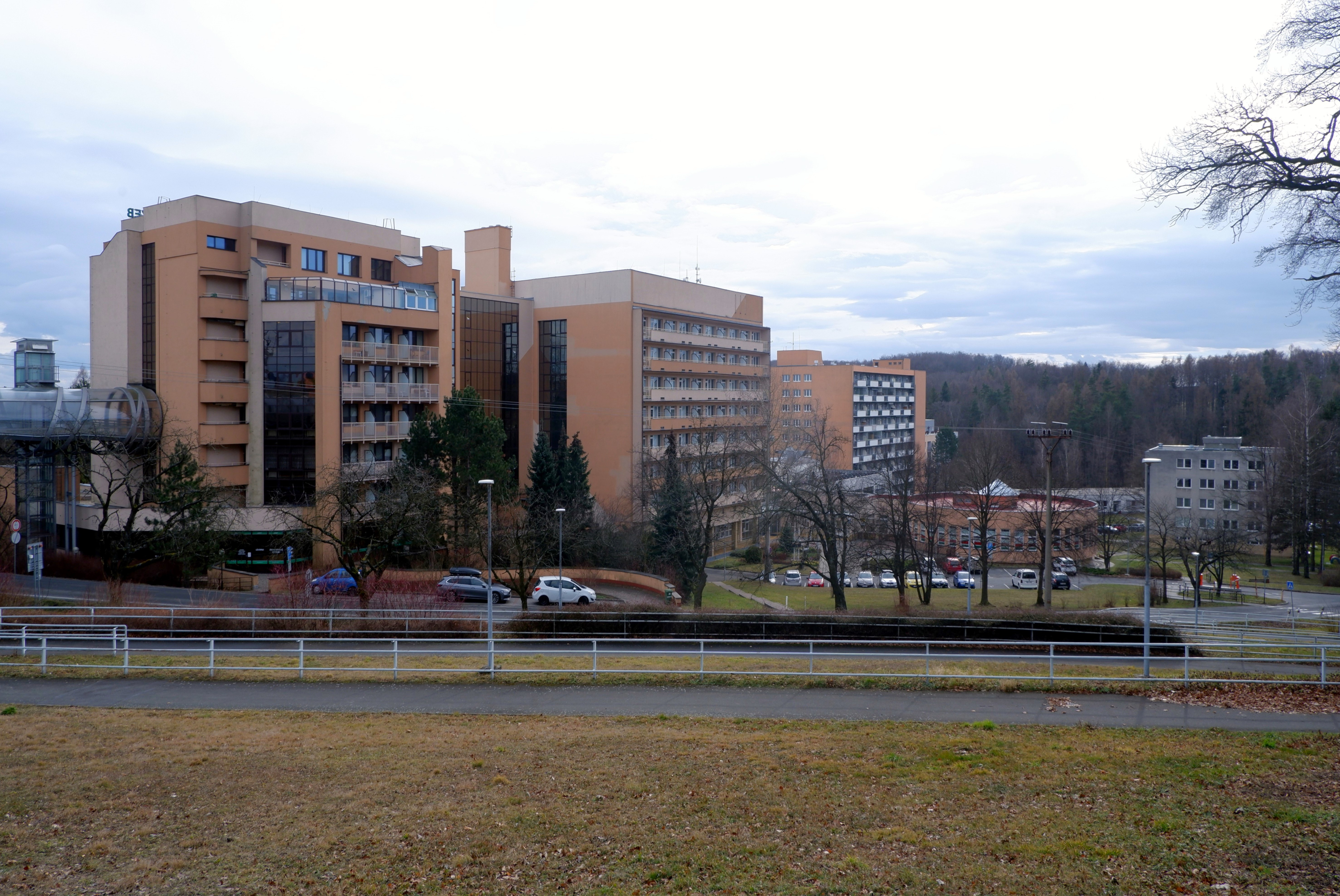
Rehabilitation Institute Hrabyně

Hrabyně is known for the Rehabilitation Institute Hrabyně, which was founded in the 1950s. It deals with the treatment of patients with musculoskeletal and nervous system disorders.

== Transport ==
The I/11 road from Ostrava to Opava runs through the municipality.

== Sights ==
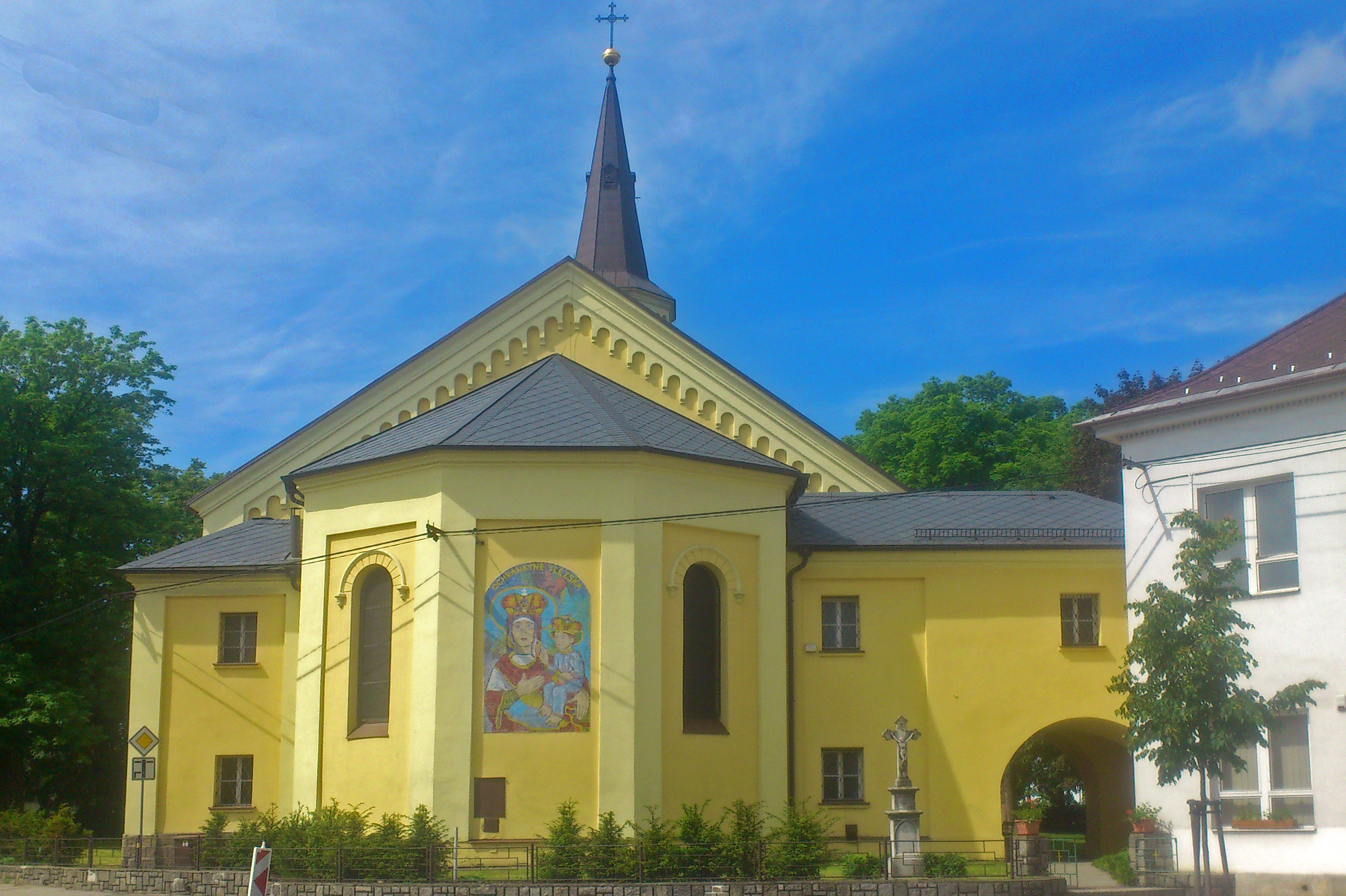
Church of the Assumption of the Virgin Mary

The most important monument is the World War II Memorial. It was built in 1976–1980 as a reminder of the liberation struggles in the region at the end of World War II. It is administered by the Silesian Museum in Opava.

The main landmark of Hrabyně is the Church of the Assumption of the Virgin Mary. The original church was built in 1830 and consecrated in 1861. In 1885, it was demolished and replaced by the current structure, which was consecrated in 1887.

== Notable people ==
- Karel Engliš (1880–1961), economist, political scientist and politician
