= Nový Dvůr Arboretum =

Arboretum in Stěbořice, Czech Republic

Coordinates: 49.9350°N 17.7709°E

- Arboretum Nový Dvůr
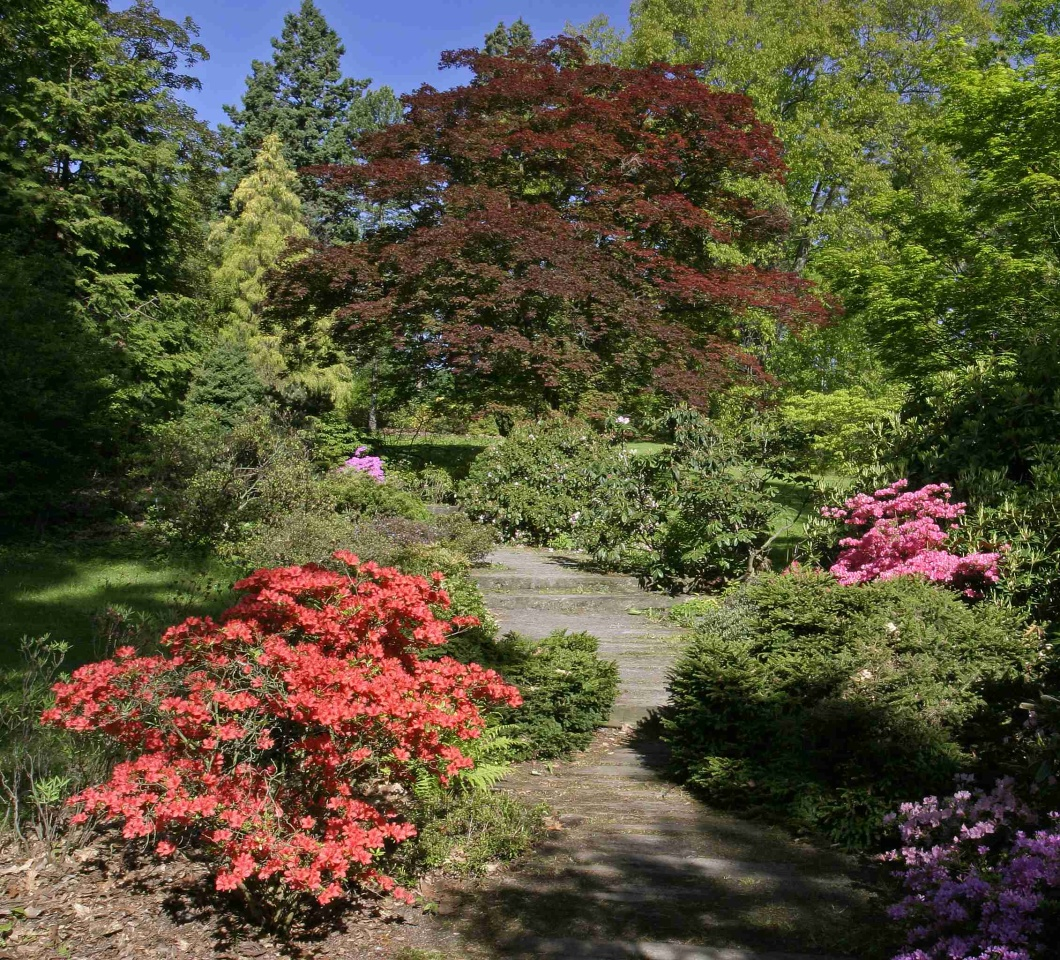
- Established: 1906
- Collection size: 7,000 species
- Website: Silesian Museum

The Nový Dvůr Arboretum is an arboretum in Stěbořice, Czech Republic. The arboretum is part of the Silesian Museum in Opava, and includes 7,000 different species from five continents, spread over 23 hectares. There are also 200 square metres of greenhouse space, including both tropical and sub-tropical climates, allowing the arboretum to also include trees and plants that require the climates of Africa, Asia, America and Australasia.

== History ==
The collection was started by Quido Reidl in 1906 and expanded to 500 different species by 1928. At that time there was a manor house that had been built by Baron Antonín Luft and another older manor house built by Ludvík Klettenhof before 1836.

Reidl moved on to create another arboretum in 1928 but he left this collection in the care of his daughter Elisabeth. She and her husband Walter Schubert looked after the manor houses and the collection until 1945, but they made no additions or improvements during that time. In 1945 the manor houses were confiscated by the Czechoslovak state.

Following the end of the war the arboretum was neglected by a series of different owners until 1958 when the Silesian Museum took control of the site, and restored the original style, consisting of both solitary and mixed groups of trees spread around open areas. This design allows visitors to observe the different textures and shapes as they change during the seasons. The older manor house became part of a farm, and was demolished in the 1960s.
