= National Bank of Czechoslovakia =

Central bank of Czechoslovakia

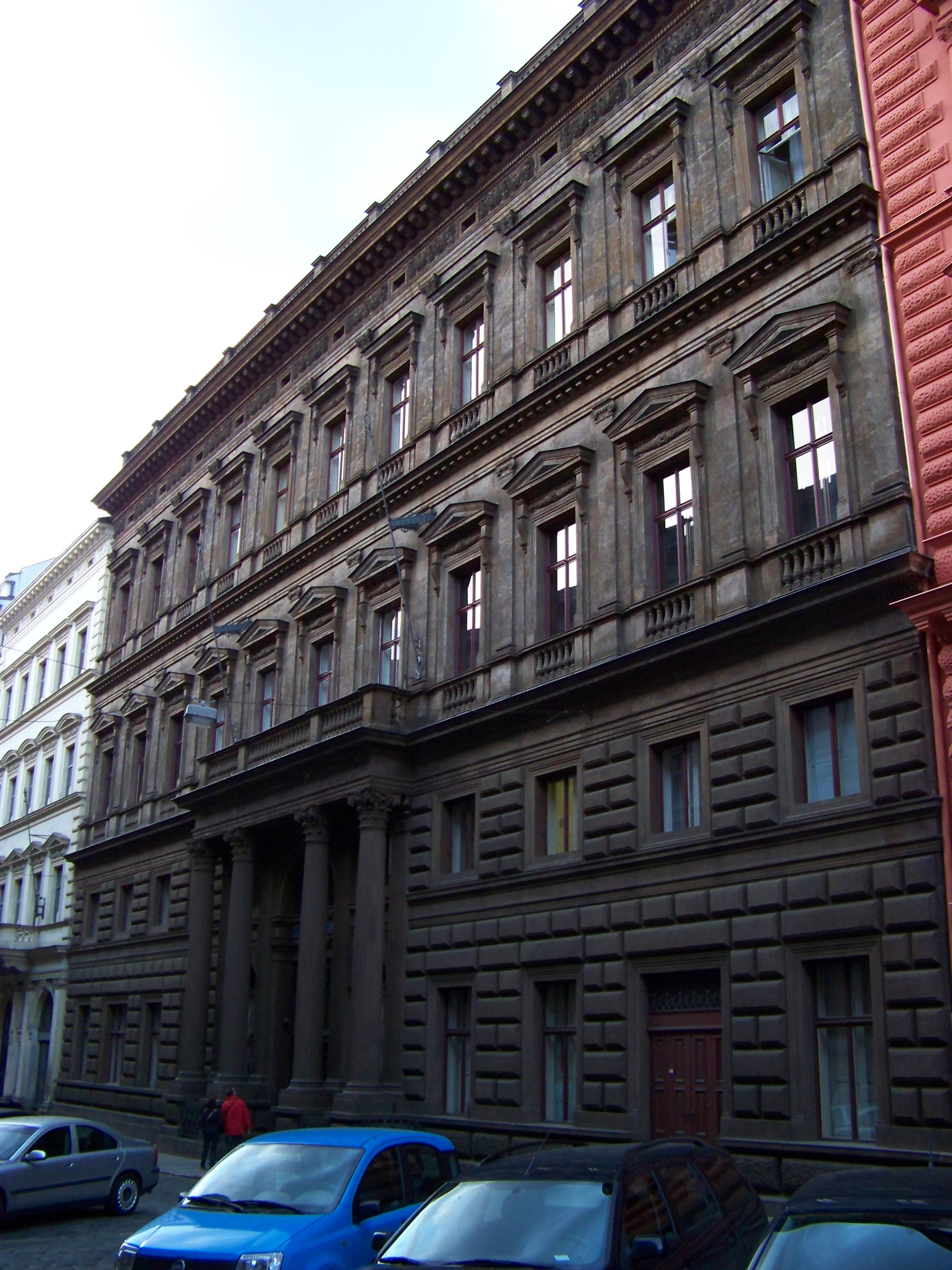
The National Bank of Czechoslovakia was established in the Schebek Palace, the former Prague branch of the Austro-Hungarian Bank.

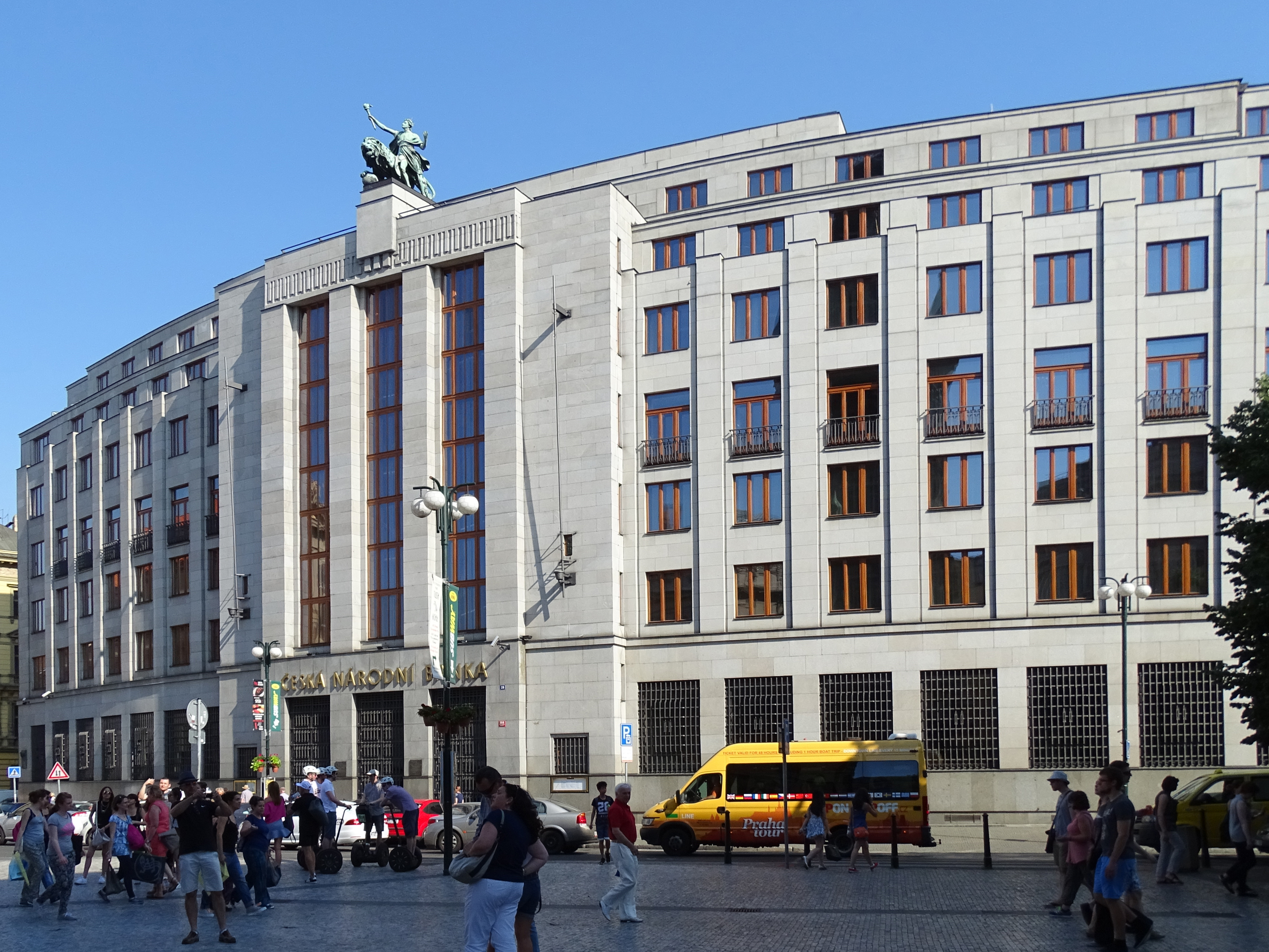
From its establishment in 1950, the State Bank of Czechoslovakia was located in the former Prague head office of Živnostenská Banka.

The National Bank of Czechoslovakia (Czech: Národní banka Československá) was the central bank of Czechoslovakia between 1926 and 1939, succeeding the Austro-Hungarian Bank after a 6-year interval during which central banking functions were assumed directly by the country's ministry of finance.

Between 1939 and 1945, its activities were divided into the National Bank for Bohemia and Moravia in Prague (Czech: Národní banka pro Čechy a Moravu v Praze, German: Nationalbank für Böhmen und Mähren in Prag) in the Protectorate of Bohemia and Moravia and the Slovak National Bank (Slovak: Slovenská Národná Banka) in the Slovak Republic. The National Bank was re-established in reunified Czechoslovakia in 1945, and in 1950 renamed State Bank of Czechoslovakia (Czech: Státní banka československá, Slovak: Štátna banka československá).

On 1 January 1993, the State Bank of Czechoslovakia was replaced by its two successor entities, the Czech National Bank in the Czech Republic and the National Bank of Slovakia in Slovakia.

== Background ==
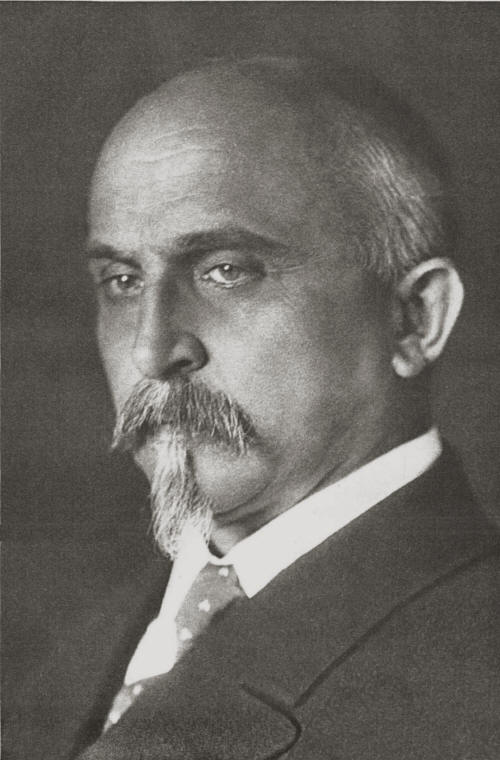
Alois Rašín, the founder of independent Czechoslovakia's monetary system

Following the collapse of the Habsburg Monarchy and the Czechoslovak declaration of independence in October 1918, monetary authority under the First Czechoslovak Republic was initially exercised by the Banking Office of the Ministry of Finance.

The Czechoslovak economy suffered a major economic downturn between 1921 and 1923. In response to the economic decline, the Finance Minister at the time, Alois Rašín, implemented strong deflationary policies in an attempt to prevent further hyperinflation. While Rašín's policies most likely averted hyperinflation as extreme as happened in Austria and Germany, public opinion was hostile to the Ministry of Finance. Rašín was assassinated on 5 January 1923 by a disturbed youth.

== National Bank of Czechoslovakia ==
The National Bank of Czechoslovakia was established in 1926. In the following years, the country experienced a period of economic prosperity, including in terms of manufacturing activity, currency strength, and general economic growth. The Czechoslovak banking sector grew to over 100 banks and more than 200 credit unions.

In the aftermath of the Wall Street crash of 1929, the Czechoslovak economy entered depression. The National Bank originally followed a deflationary monetary policy, which exacerbated the problems. The National bank also eliminated the ability to convert currency into gold and competitive devaluation. The National Bank's policies generated social discontent. Minister of Finance Karel Engliš attempted to end the deflationary policy by devaluating the koruna, while maintaining the gold standard. In opposition to Engliš, the Social Democrats proposed to leave the gold standard. Political parties proposed different solutions for recovery, which caused stalemate. Ultimately, the gold standard was abandoned, and Engliš resigned on 16 April 1931. Despite political turmoil and difficulties with the central bank, Czechoslovakia began a slow rebound in 1934.

One of the important outcomes of the Great Depression was the increase in support for government intervention in the economy. Price support systems increased in popularity, which instituted moderating prices, wages and currency. The government, now with more control over the central bank, lowered interest rates and devalued the koruna. Meanwhile, support for Communism grew among the Czechoslovak public.

== World War II and aftermath ==
In March 1939, Adolf Hitler fostered the secession of Slovakia and took over the Protectorate of Bohemia and Moravia, and the National Bank was consequently divided into two separate entities respectively in Bratislava and Prague. More than 45 metric tons of the National Bank's gold reserves was seized by Deutsche Reichsbank. Josef Kalfus acted as Minister of Finance in Prague during Nazi occupation.

After the end of the war, the two central banks were reunified under their former name. Between 1945 and 1948, the banking system underwent nationalization in several phases, under Soviet influence and with the increasingly dominant influence of the Communist Party of Czechoslovakia.

== State Bank of Czechoslovakia ==
On 1 July 1950, the Central bank was fully nationalized and renamed the State Bank of Czechoslovakia, as it simultaneously incorporated the former operations of Živnostenská Banka, Slovenská Tatra Banka (an entity formed in 1948 to consolidate the former Slovak banks), and Poštová Sporiteľňa (Czechoslovak postal savings bank).

Under the communist single-tier banking system, the role of the State Bank expanded to that of a commercial bank, central bank, and investment bank. The institution was a supervisory agent of the government, in charge of planning for the economic needs of the country. The State Bank granted credit to the individuals that needed capital to meet their business's economic expectations. It also acted as the supervisor of the other state-owned banks, including two savings bank and the Commercial Bank of Czechoslovakia which was in charge of foreign currency exchange. In 1958, the State Bank took control over all capital allocation.

In November 1989, just a few days before Czechoslovakia's Velvet Revolution, the Communist government passed a law that re-established a two-tier banking system and correspondingly focused the role of the State Bank on currency stability. That legislation came into force on 1 January 1990. the State Bank's commercial banking operations were spun off as Komerční banka.

With the dissolution of Czechoslovakia, the State Bank of Czechoslovakia was split into the Czech National Bank and the National Bank of Slovakia by the respective laws of the new states on 1 January 1993.

== Leadership ==
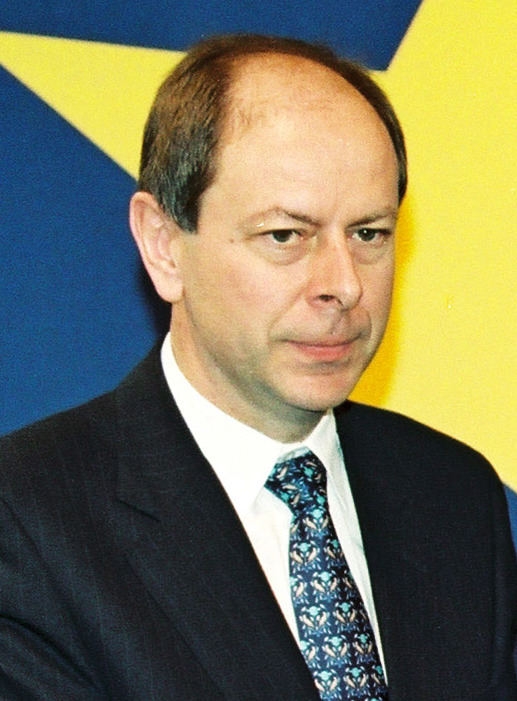
Josef Tošovský was the last head of the State Bank of Czechoslovakia and went on to lead the Czech National Bank until 2000, aside from a brief stint as Czech Prime Minister in 1997-1998

=== Ministers of Finance between 1919 and 1926 ===
- Alois Rašín, March 1919 – July 1919
- Cyril Horáček, July 1919 – October 1919
- Kuneš Sonntag, October 1919 – May 1920
- Karel Engliš, May 1920 – March 1921
- Vladimír Hanačík, March 1921 – September 1921
- Augustin Novák, October 1921 – October 1922
- Alois Rašín, October 1922 – January 1923
- Bohdan Bečka, February 1923 – November 1925
- Karel Engliš, December 1925 – January 1926

=== Governors of the National Bank of Czechoslovakia ===
- Vilém Pospíšil, January 1926 – February 1934
- Karel Engliš, February 1934 – February 1939

=== Governor of the National Bank for Bohemia and Moravia in Prague ===
- Ladislav F. Dvořák, 1939 – 1945

=== Governor of the Slovak National Bank ===
- Imrich Karvaš, 1939 – September 1944

=== Governor of the National Bank of Czechoslovakia ===
- Jaroslav Nebesář, June 1945 – July 1950

=== General Directors of the State Bank of Czechoslovakia ===
- Otakar Pohl, July 1950 – February 1954
- Jaroslav Kabeš, February 1954 – August 1957
- Otakar Pohl, August 1957 – October 1969
- Svatopluk Potáč, October 1969 – June 1981
- Jan Stejskal, June 1981 – November 1988
- Svatopluk Potáč, November 1988 – December 1989
- Josef Tošovský, December 1989 – December 1992

== Branches ==
In most localities, the National Bank maintained existing branches of the Austro-Hungarian Bank. In some cases, however, it commissioned new buildings from Czechoslovak architects, for example in Slovakia from Emil Belluš (in Bratislava), Vladimír Fischer (in Ružomberok), and Ladislav Skřivánek (in Banská Bystrica).

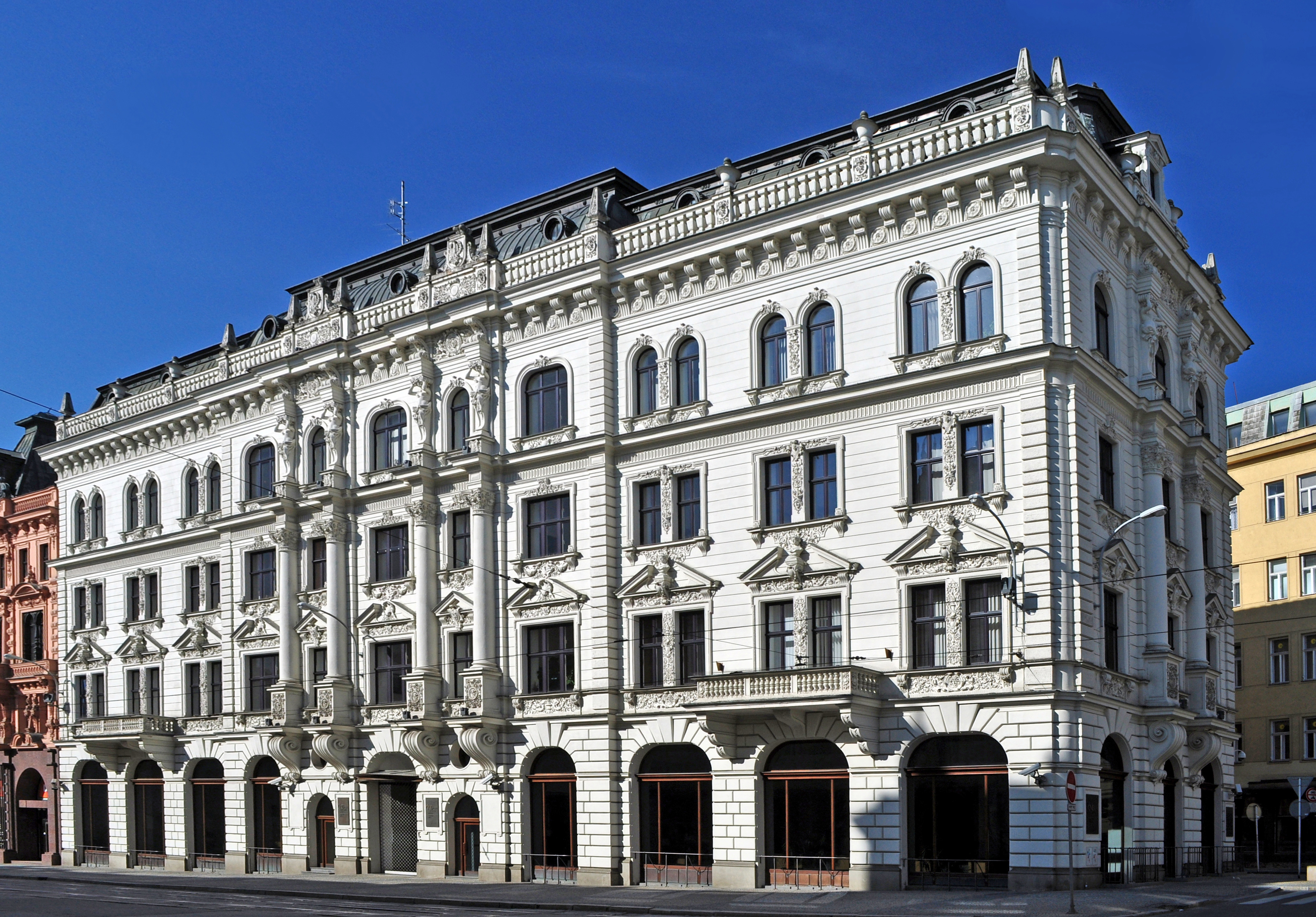
Former branch in Brno

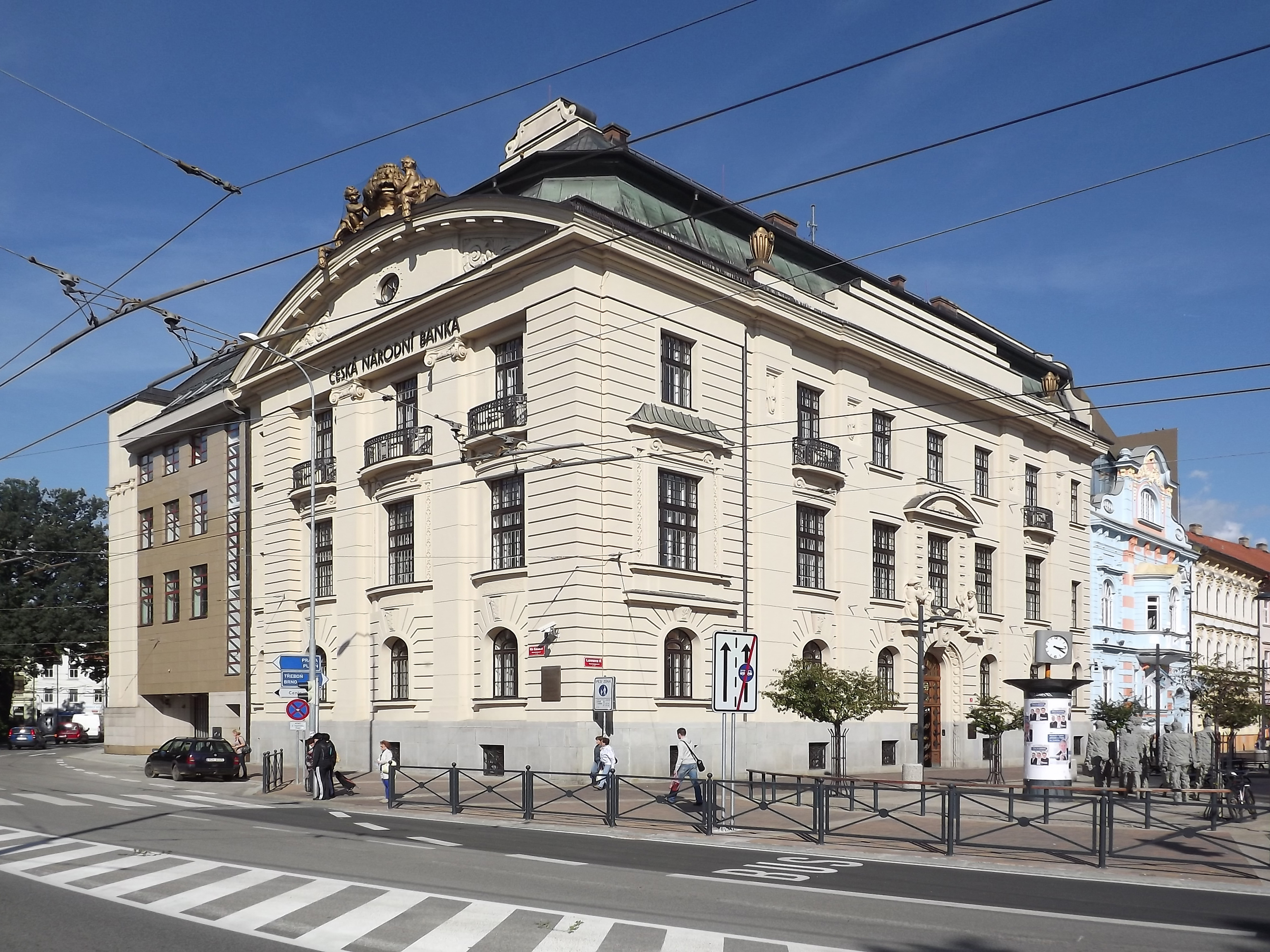
Former branch in České Budějovice

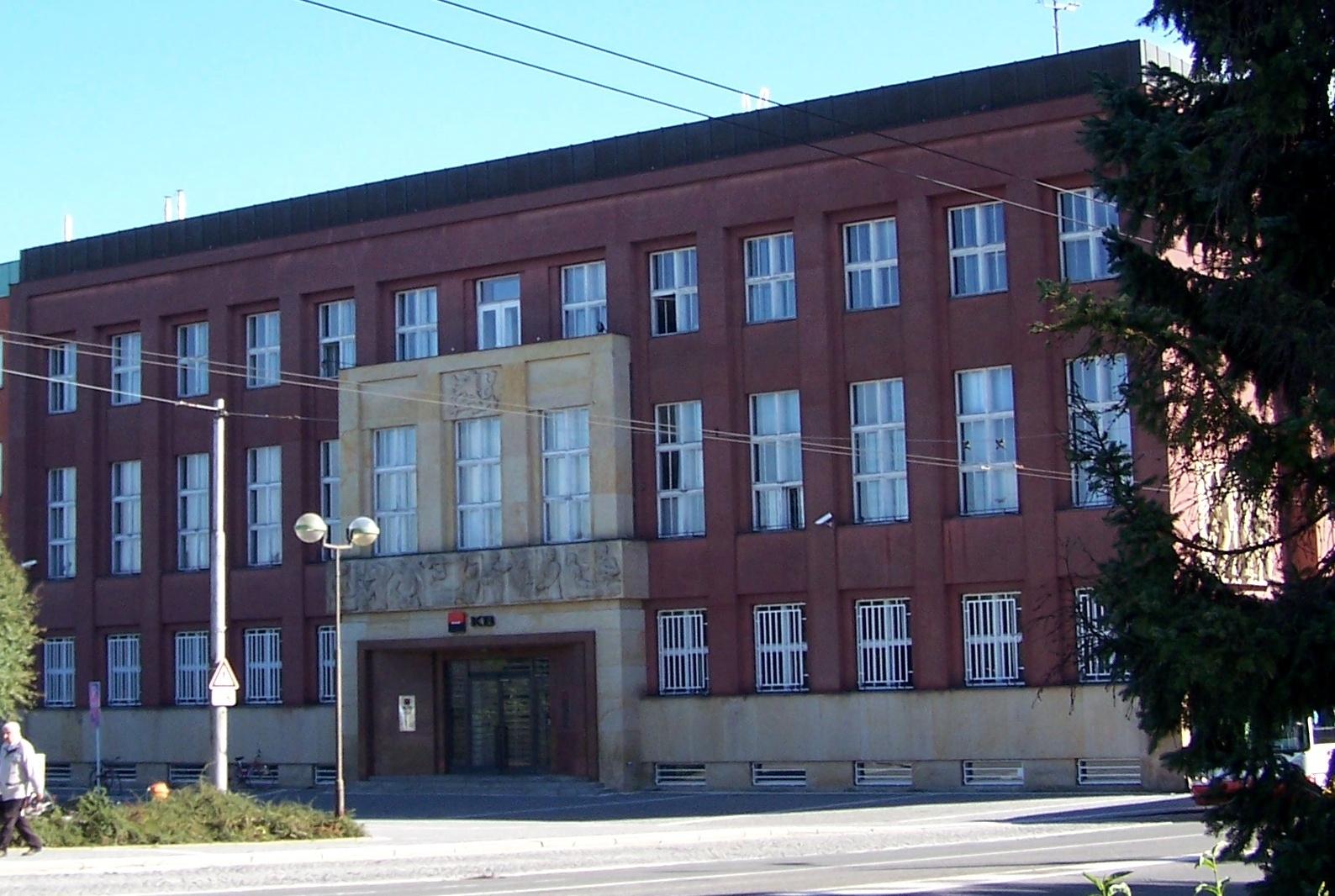
Former branch in Hradec Králové

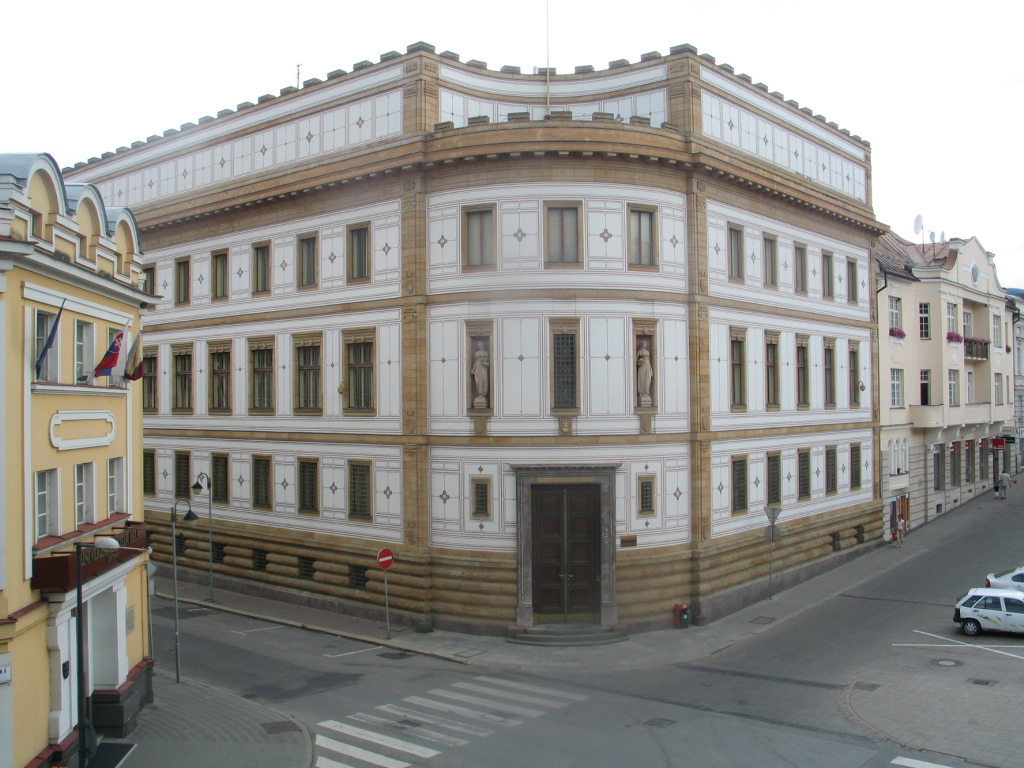
Former branch in Banská Bystrica, built 1930–1932

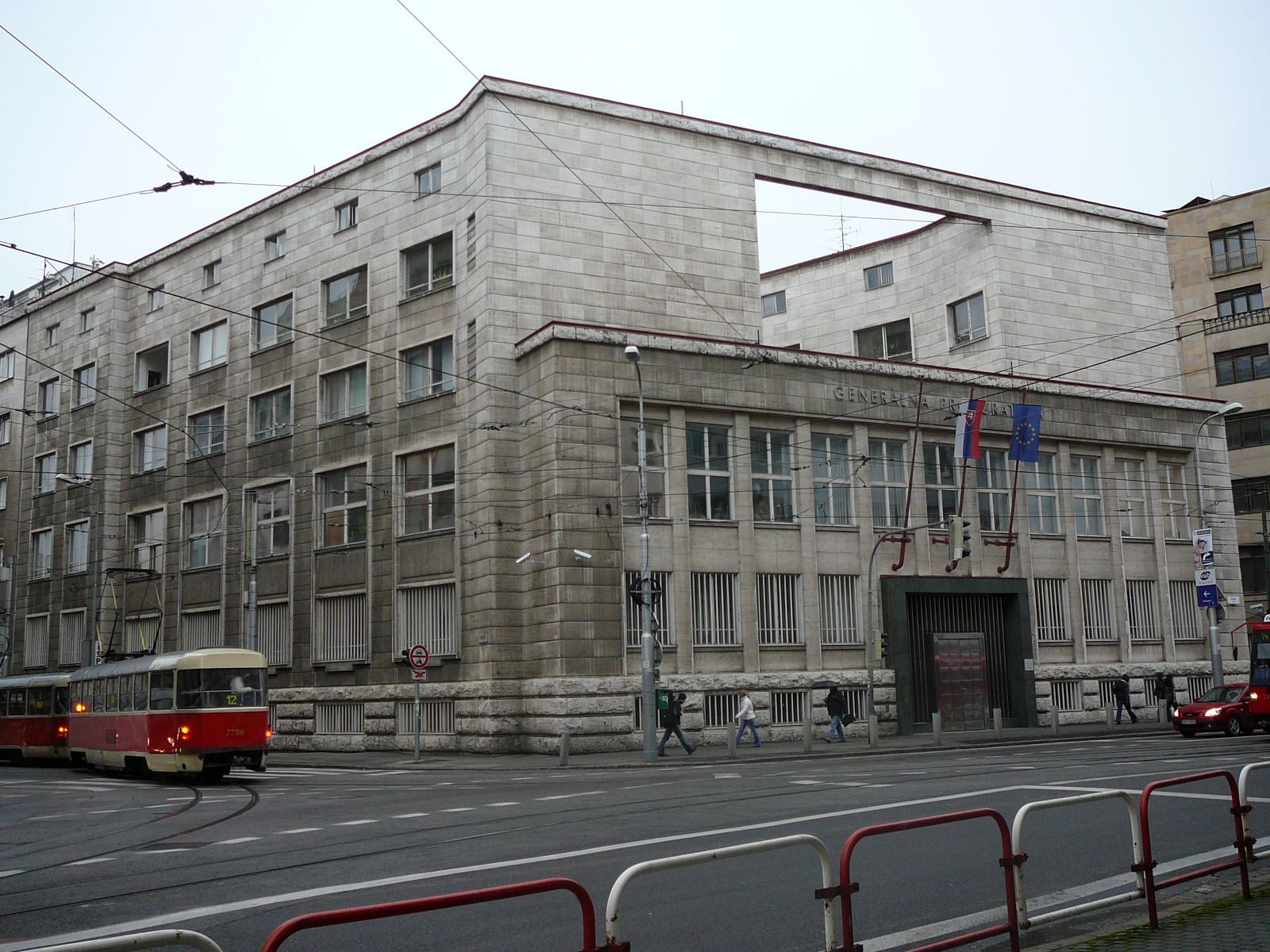
Former branch in Bratislava, built 1936–1938

== See also ==
- National Bank of Yugoslavia
- List of banks in the Czech Republic
- List of central banks
