= Jaromír Dolanský =

Czechoslovak communist politician (1895–1973)

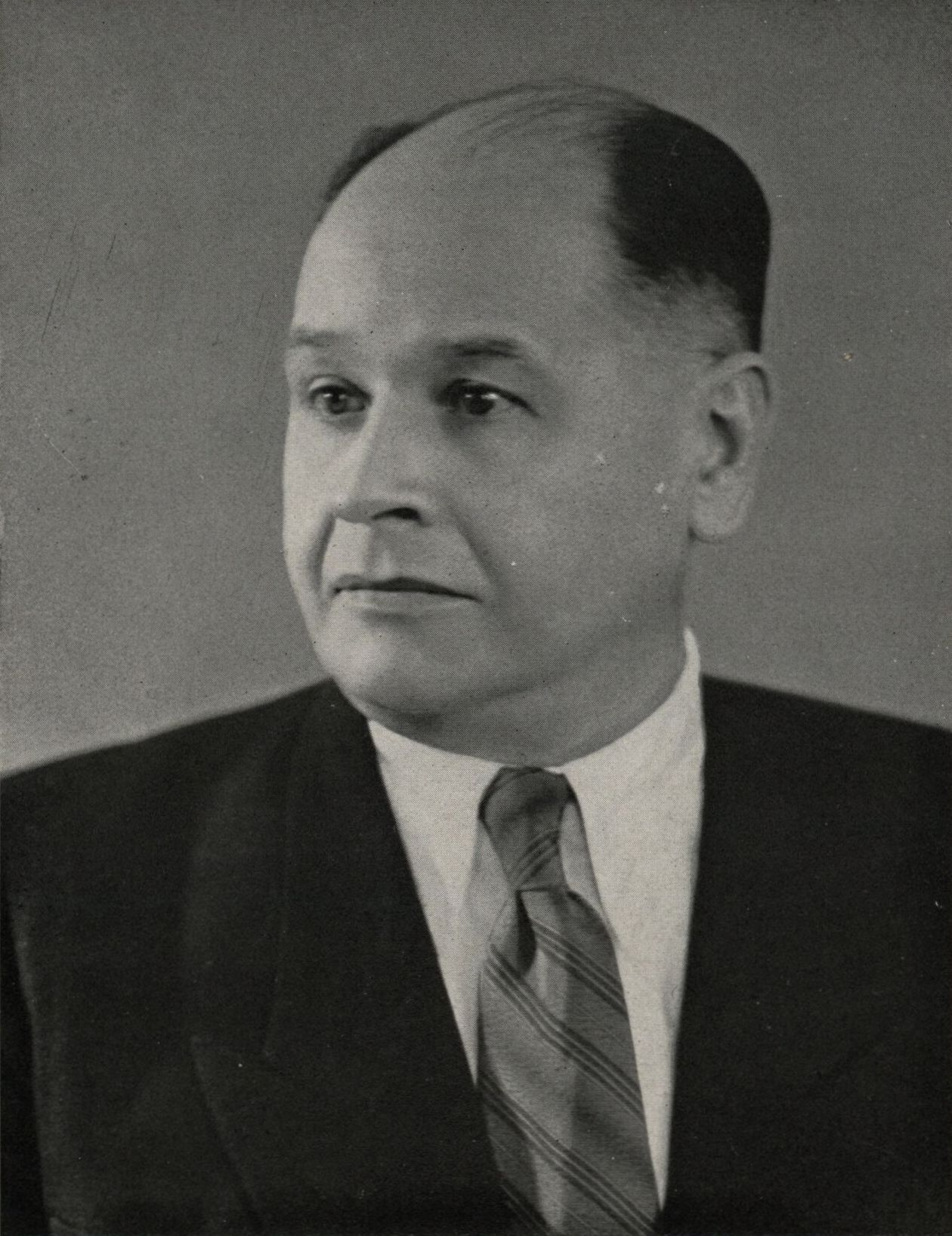
- Jaromír Dolanský in 1948

Deputy Prime Minister of Czechoslovakia
- In office 21 March 1951 – 20 September 1963
- Prime Minister: Antonín Zápotocký (1951–1953); Viliam Široký (1953–1963)

Minister of Finance
- In office 2 July 1946 – 5 April 1949
- Prime Minister: Klement Gottwald (1946–1948); Antonín Zápotocký (1948–1949)
- Preceded by: Vavro Šrobár
- Succeeded by: Jaroslav Kabeš

Personal details
- Born: 15 February 1895 Karlín, Austria-Hungary
- Died: 16 July 1973 (aged 78) Prague, Czechoslovakia
- Party: Communist Party of Czechoslovakia
- Education: Charles University
- Profession: Economist, lawyer
- Awards: Three Orders of Klement Gottwald

Jaromír Dolanský (15 February 1895 – 16 July 1973) was a Czechoslovak communist politician and economist.

== Biography ==
Dolanský was born into the family of a teacher and philologist. He studied at the Faculty of Law at Charles University in Prague from 1913 to 1915. He then served on the Russian Eastern Front during World War I, and resumed his studies at the university from 1918 to 1921. In 1922 he joined the Communist Party of Czechoslovakia (KSČ).

Dolanský joined the radical, Moscow- and Comintern-oriented group around Klement Gottwald, which later went down in history under the nickname karlínští kluci ("Karlín boys"). At the Fifth Congress of the KSČ in February 1929, these young officials seized power in the KSČ. He directed the theoretical party magazine Komunistická revue from 1924, and was a member of the party leadership from around 1938. Dolanský was involved in the trade union movement and was secretary of the radical organization Rudé odbory ("Red Trade Unions") from 1930 to 1935. From 1935 he was a member of the National Assembly.

After the occupation of the Czech lands by Nazi Germany in 1939, Dolanský was arrested while trying to flee the country. After being interned at Pankrác Prison in Prague, he was briefly held in Dresden before being sent to Sachsenhausen concentration camp. Dolanský would be imprisoned in Sachsenhausen for five years, until the end of World War II.

After the end of the war, Dolanský returned to Czechoslovakia and again sat on the Central Committee of the Communist Party from 2 August 1945; on 4 September 1945, he was elected to the Central Committee Presidium, where he sat until 15 June 1954. From September 1951 to June 1954, he also took part in meetings of the Political Secretariat of the Central Committee. He was a member of the Politburo of the Central Committee until 8 December 1962, and then again of the Presidium of the Central Committee until 4 April 1968.

Dolanský also served as a government minister during the post-war years. From 1946 to 1949, he was Minister of Finance in the Klement Gottwald government and in the government of Antonín Zápotocký, then Deputy Prime Minister of the Viliam Široký governments from 1953 to 1963. Together with Jaroslav Kabeš, he participated in the preparation of the currency reform of 1953, which removed the savings of the population.

In December 1967, he was among the political leaders who were against the General Secretary of the Communist Party Antonín Novotný, and voted in favor of his removal. After 1968, he resigned from most posts himself. He was not criticized either during the Prague Spring or during the normalization, nor was he party membership revoked.

== Honours and awards ==
- Order of Klement Gottwald, three times (25 February 1955, 7 May 1955 and 16 January 1965)
