= Lážovice =

- Municipality
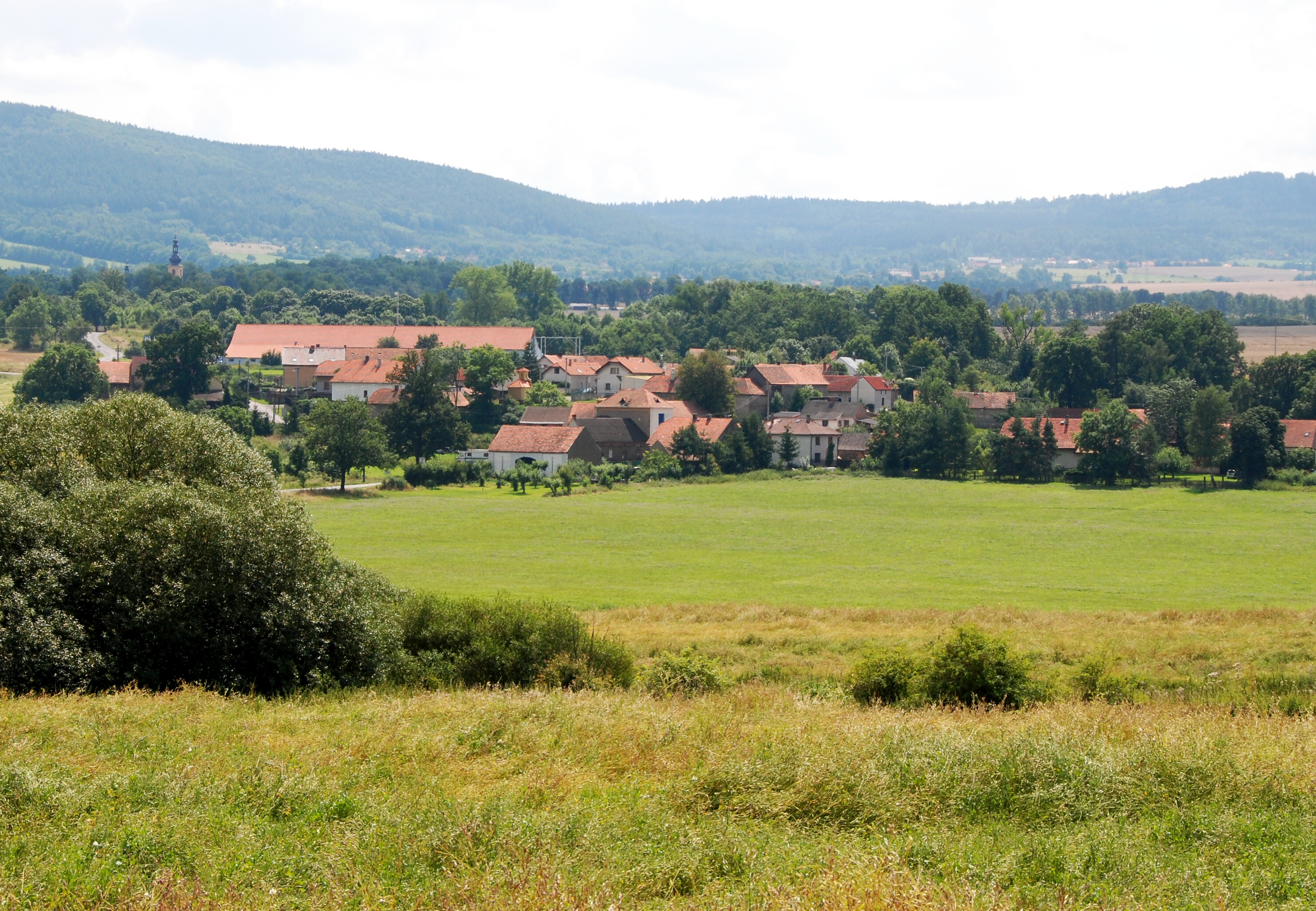
- View from the north

- Location in the Czech Republic
- Coordinates: 49°51′30″N 14°4′17″E
- Country: Czech Republic
- Region: Central Bohemian
- District: Beroun
- First mentioned: 1233

Area
  - Total: 4.89 km^{2} (1.89 sq mi)
- Elevation: 320 m (1,050 ft)

Population (2026-01-01)
  - Total: 114
  - Density: 23.3/km^{2} (60.4/sq mi)
- Time zone: UTC+1 (CET)
  - Summer (DST): UTC+2 (CEST)
- Postal code: 267 24
- Website: www.lazovice.cz

Lážovice is a municipality and village in Beroun District in the Central Bohemian Region of the Czech Republic. It has about 100 inhabitants.

== Administrative division ==
Lážovice consists of two municipal parts (in brackets population according to the 2021 census):

- Lážovice (78)
- Nové Dvory (28)

== Etymology ==
The initial name of the village was Hlázovice. The name was derived from the personal name Hláza, meaning "the village of Hláza's people". In the 17th century, the name distorted to Lážovice.

== Geography ==
Lážovice is located about 11 kilometres (7 mi) south of Beroun and 31 km (19 mi) southwest of Prague. It lies in a mostly agricultural landscape in the Hořovice Uplands. The highest point is a nameless hill at 451 m (1,480 ft) above sea level. The brook Novodvorský potok flows through the municipality. There are three small fishponds in the municipality, supplies by nameless tributaries of the Novodvorský potok.

== History ==
The first written mention of Lážovice is in a deed of King Wenceslaus I from 1233.

== Demographics ==
Historical population

Year	Pop.	±%
1869	333	—
1880	352	+5.7%
1890	302	−14.2%
1900	356	+17.9%
1910	316	−11.2%

Year	Pop.	±%
1921	297	−6.0%
1930	293	−1.3%
1950	237	−19.1%
1961	210	−11.4%
1970	174	−17.1%

Year	Pop.	±%
1980	120	−31.0%
1991	93	−22.5%
2001	78	−16.1%
2011	88	+12.8%
2021	106	+20.5%

Source: Censuses

== Transport ==
There are no railways or major roads passing through the municipality.

== Sights ==
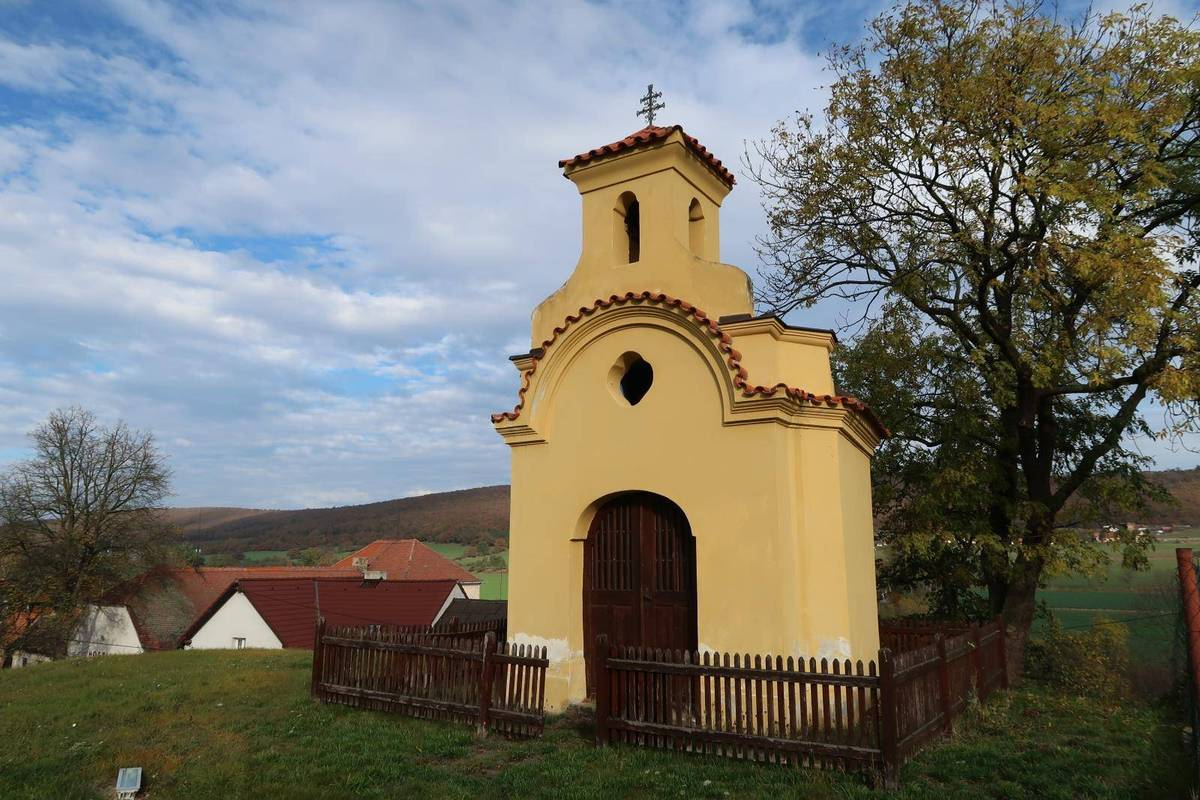
Chapel

The most valuable monument in Lážovice is a late Baroque rural chapel from the end of the 18th century.

Most of the municipal territory lies in a landscape monument zone called Osovsko. It is a regular agricultural landscape around Osov with a net of paths lined with avenues. It was established in two phases, after the Thirty Years' War and after 1805.
