= Hořičky =

- Municipality
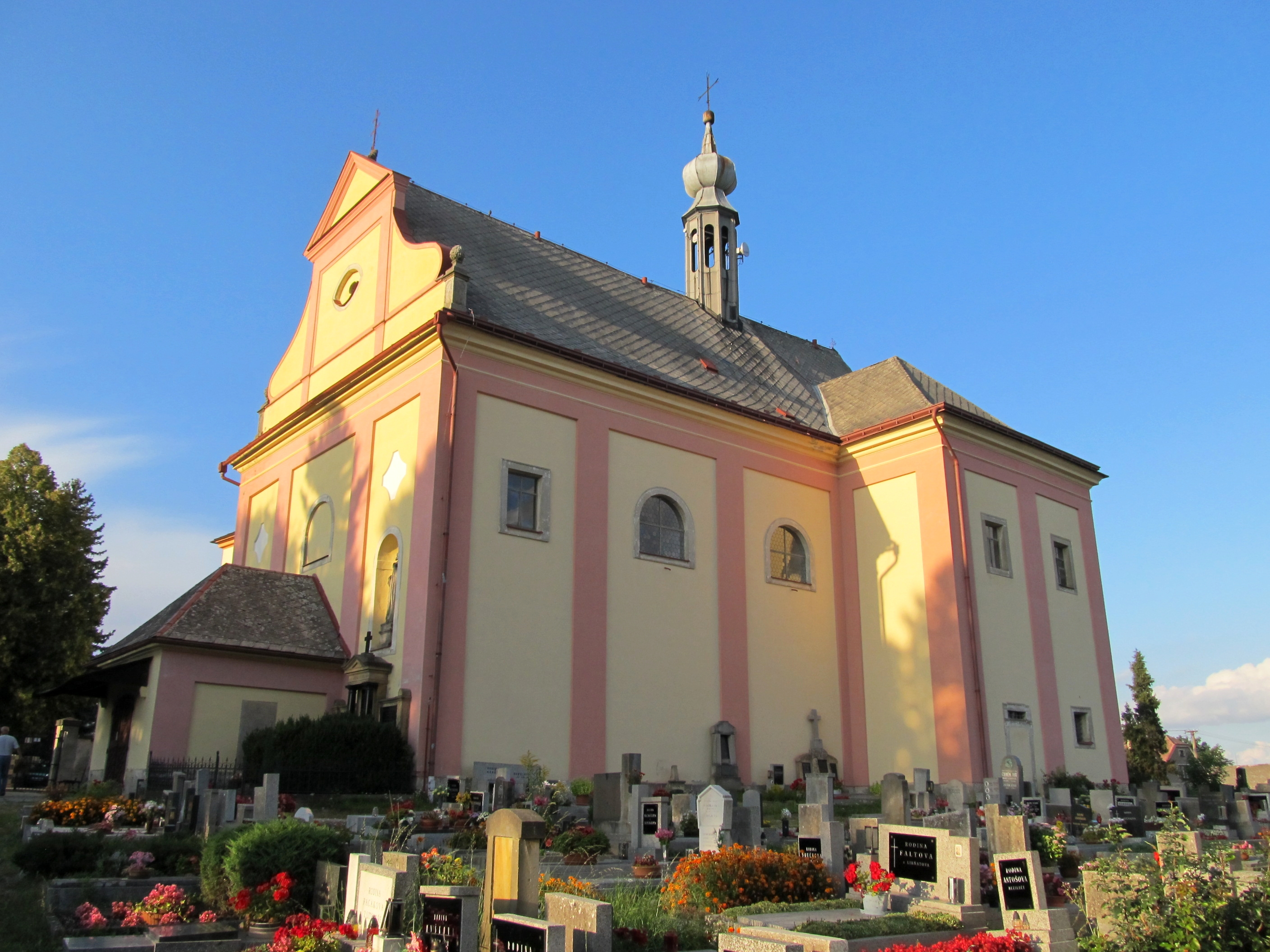
- Church of the Holy Spirit

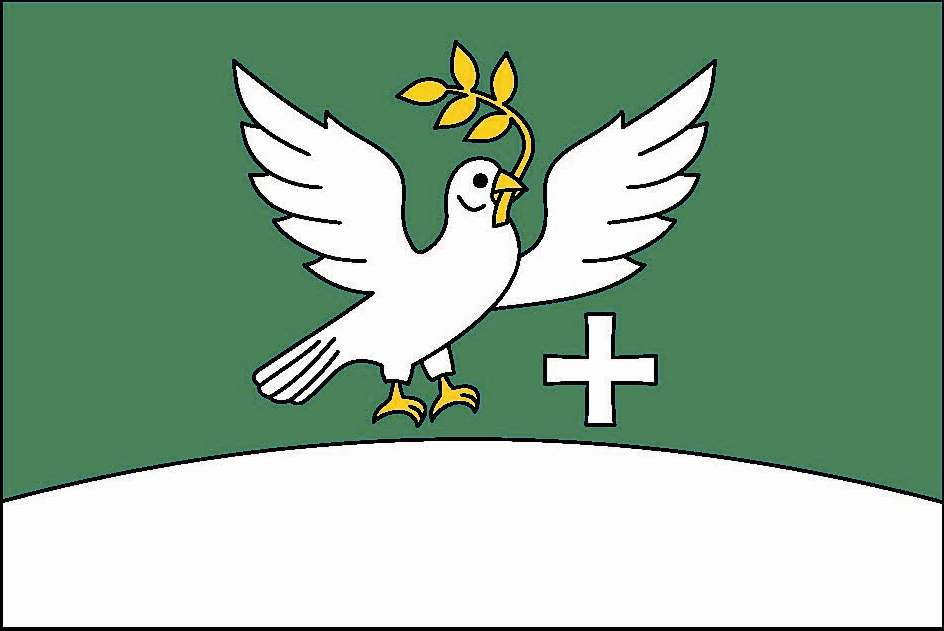
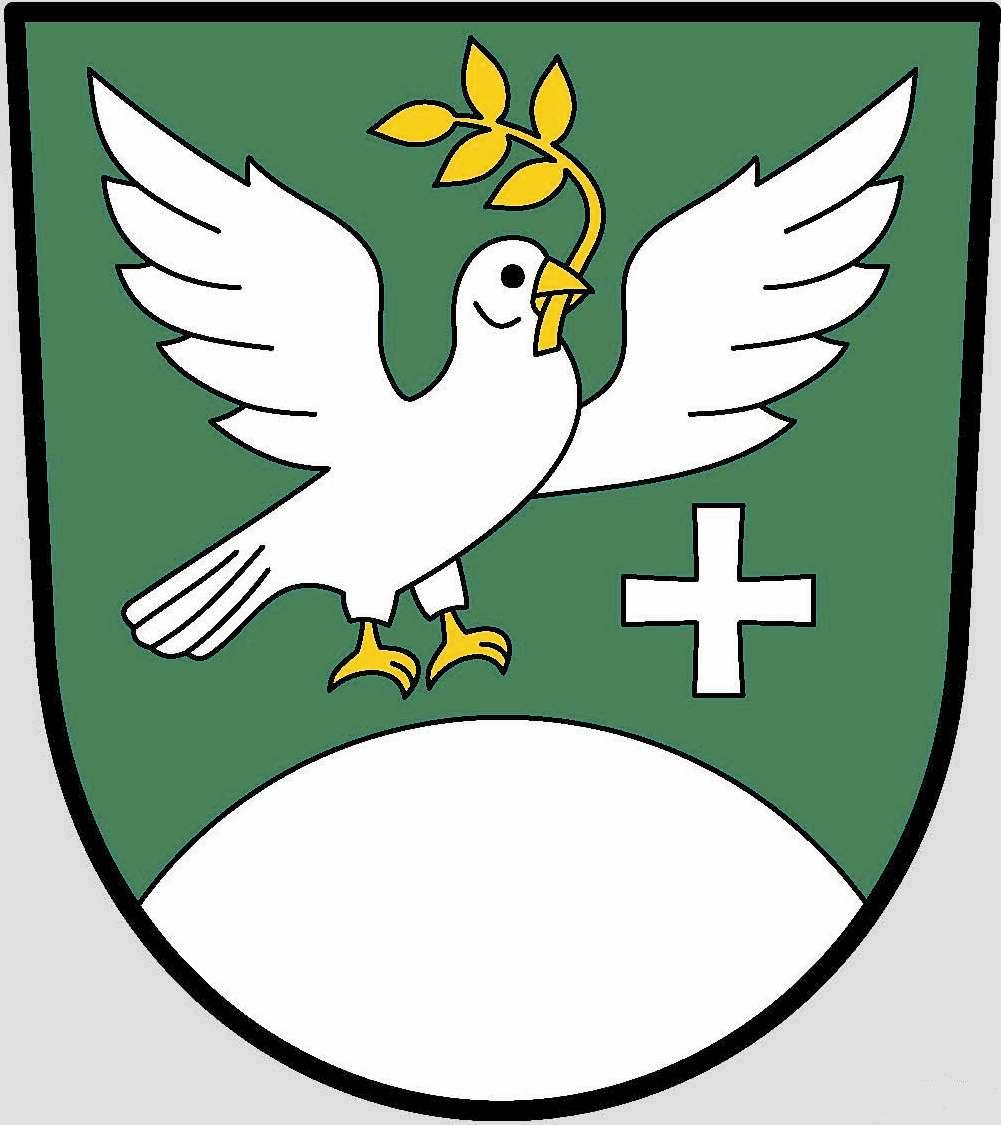
- Flag Coat of arms

- Location in the Czech Republic
- Coordinates: 50°26′41″N 15°59′37″E
- Country: Czech Republic
- Region: Hradec Králové
- District: Náchod
- First mentioned: 1357

Area
  - Total: 6.66 km^{2} (2.57 sq mi)
- Elevation: 440 m (1,440 ft)

Population (2026-01-01)
  - Total: 585
  - Density: 87.8/km^{2} (227/sq mi)
- Time zone: UTC+1 (CET)
  - Summer (DST): UTC+2 (CEST)
- Postal code: 552 05
- Website: www.horicky.cz

Hořičky (German: Klein Horschitz) is a municipality and village in Náchod District in the Hradec Králové Region of the Czech Republic. It has about 600 inhabitants.

== Administrative division ==
Hořičky consists of five municipal parts (in brackets population according to the 2021 census):

- Hořičky (386)
- Chlístov (67)
- Křižanov (60)
- Mečov (15)
- Nový Dvůr (25)

== Demographics ==
Historical population
Year	Pop.	±%
1869	1,139	—
1880	1,098	−3.6%
1890	1,079	−1.7%
1900	985	−8.7%
1910	874	−11.3%
1921	824	−5.7%
1930	780	−5.3%
1950	563	−27.8%
1961	575	+2.1%
1970	555	−3.5%
1980	502	−9.5%
1991	459	−8.6%
2001	489	+6.5%
2011	521	+6.5%
2021	553	+6.1%
Source: Censuses
