= Nové Dvory (Příbram District) =

- Municipality
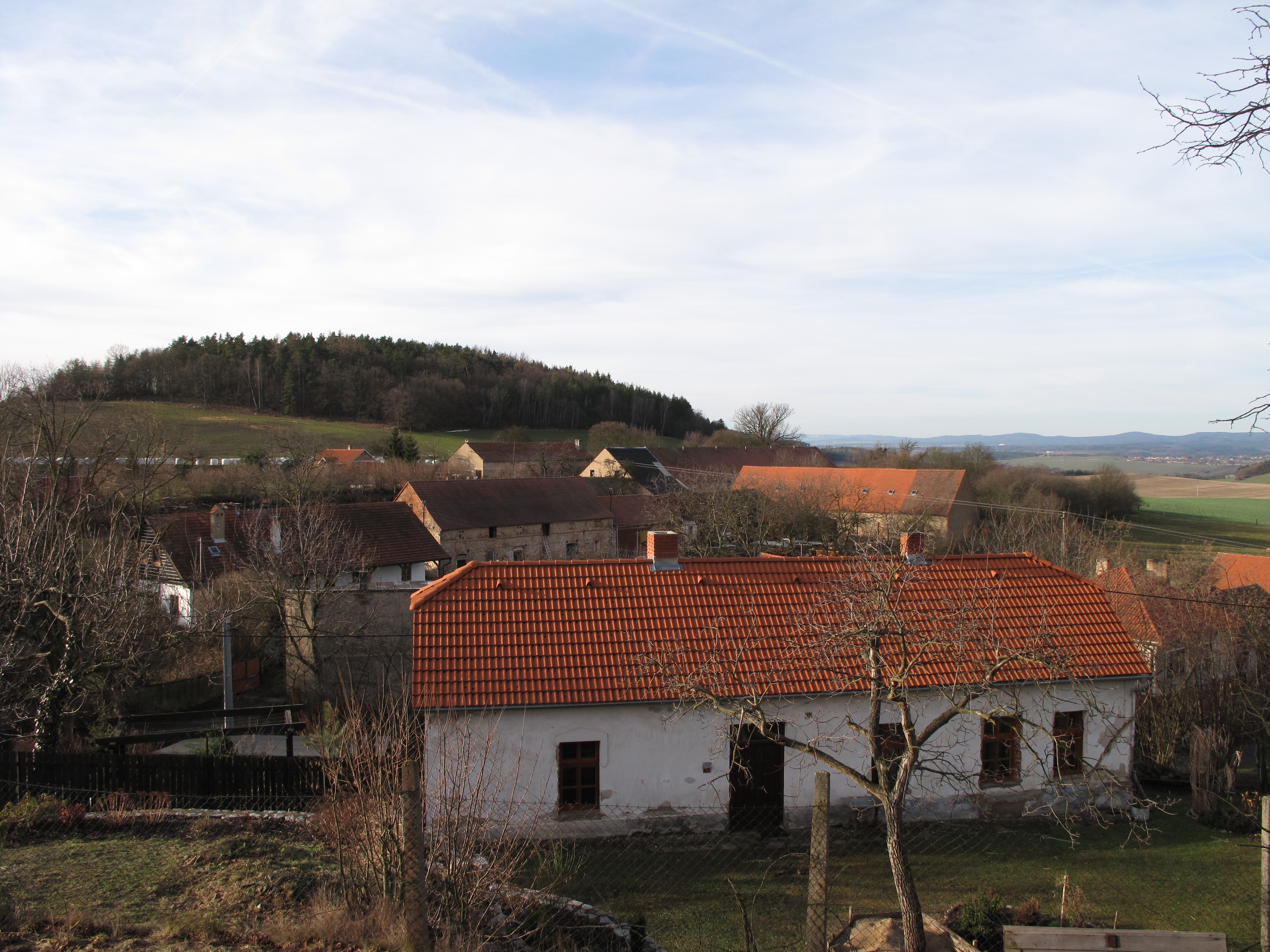
- General view

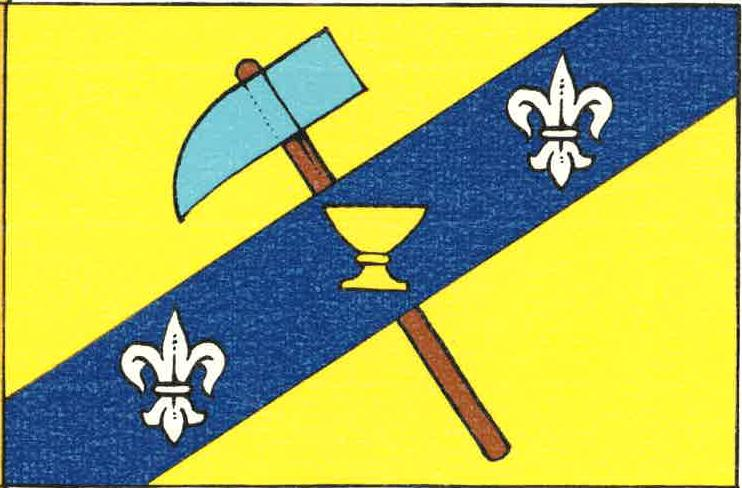
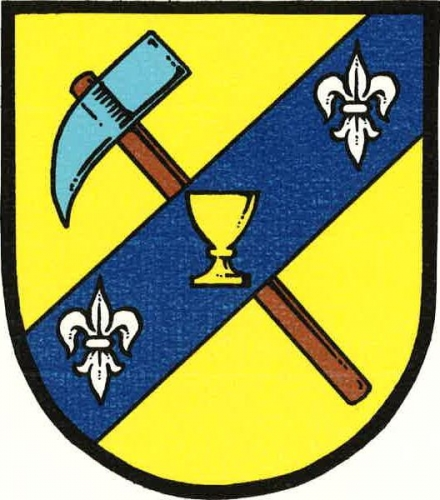
- Flag Coat of arms

- Location in the Czech Republic
- Coordinates: 49°48′12″N 14°21′25″E
- Country: Czech Republic
- Region: Central Bohemian
- District: Příbram
- First mentioned: 1432

Area
  - Total: 8.39 km^{2} (3.24 sq mi)
- Elevation: 350 m (1,150 ft)

Population (2026-01-01)
  - Total: 277
  - Density: 33.0/km^{2} (85.5/sq mi)
- Time zone: UTC+1 (CET)
  - Summer (DST): UTC+2 (CEST)
- Postal code: 262 03
- Website: www.novedvory-pb.cz

Nové Dvory is a municipality and village in Příbram District in the Central Bohemian Region of the Czech Republic. It has about 300 inhabitants.

== Administrative division ==
Nové Dvory consists of two municipal parts (in brackets population according to the 2021 census):

- Nové Dvory (197)
- Krámy (102)

== Etymology ==
The name literally means 'new courts' in Czech.

== Geography ==
Nové Dvory is located about 28 kilometres (17 mi) northeast of Příbram and 25 km (16 mi) south of Prague. It lies in the Benešov Uplands. The highest point is a nameless hill at 455 m (1,493 ft) above sea level.

== History ==
The first written mention of Nové Dvory is from 1432. Krámy was first mentioned in 1304.

== Demographics ==
Historical population

| Year | Pop. | ±% |
|---|---|---|
| 1869 | 361 | — |
| 1880 | 450 | +24.7% |
| 1890 | 453 | +0.7% |
| 1900 | 461 | +1.8% |
| 1910 | 453 | −1.7% |

| Year | Pop. | ±% |
|---|---|---|
| 1921 | 408 | −9.9% |
| 1930 | 393 | −3.7% |
| 1950 | 285 | −27.5% |
| 1961 | 237 | −16.8% |
| 1970 | 240 | +1.3% |

| Year | Pop. | ±% |
|---|---|---|
| 1980 | 192 | −20.0% |
| 1991 | 182 | −5.2% |
| 2001 | 191 | +4.9% |
| 2011 | 239 | +25.1% |
| 2021 | 299 | +25.1% |

Source: Censuses

== Transport ==
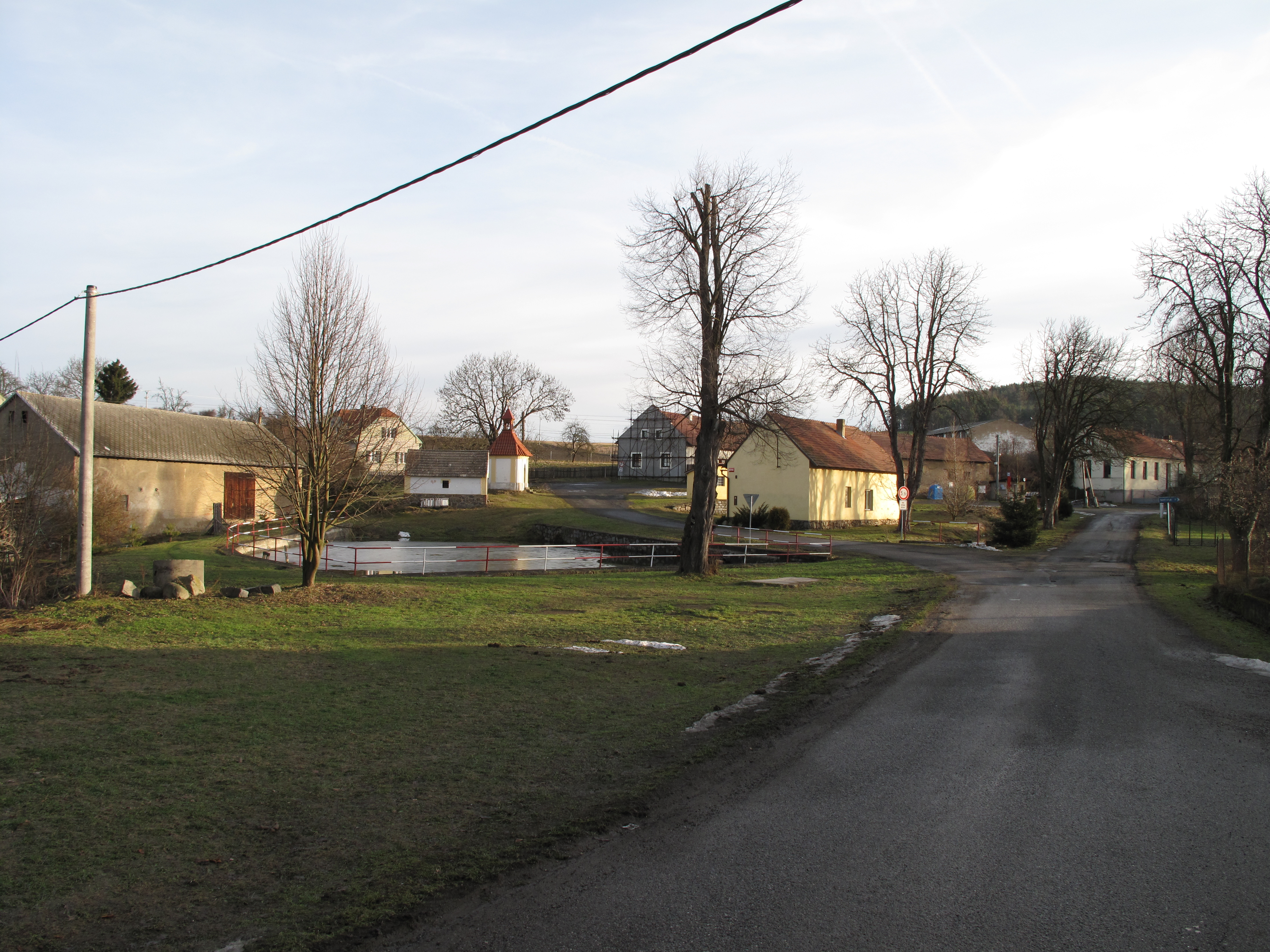
Centre of Krámy

There are no railways or major roads passing through the municipality.

== Sights ==
The only protected cultural monument in the municipality is a rural homestead from the 18th century.
