= Stěbořice =

- Municipality
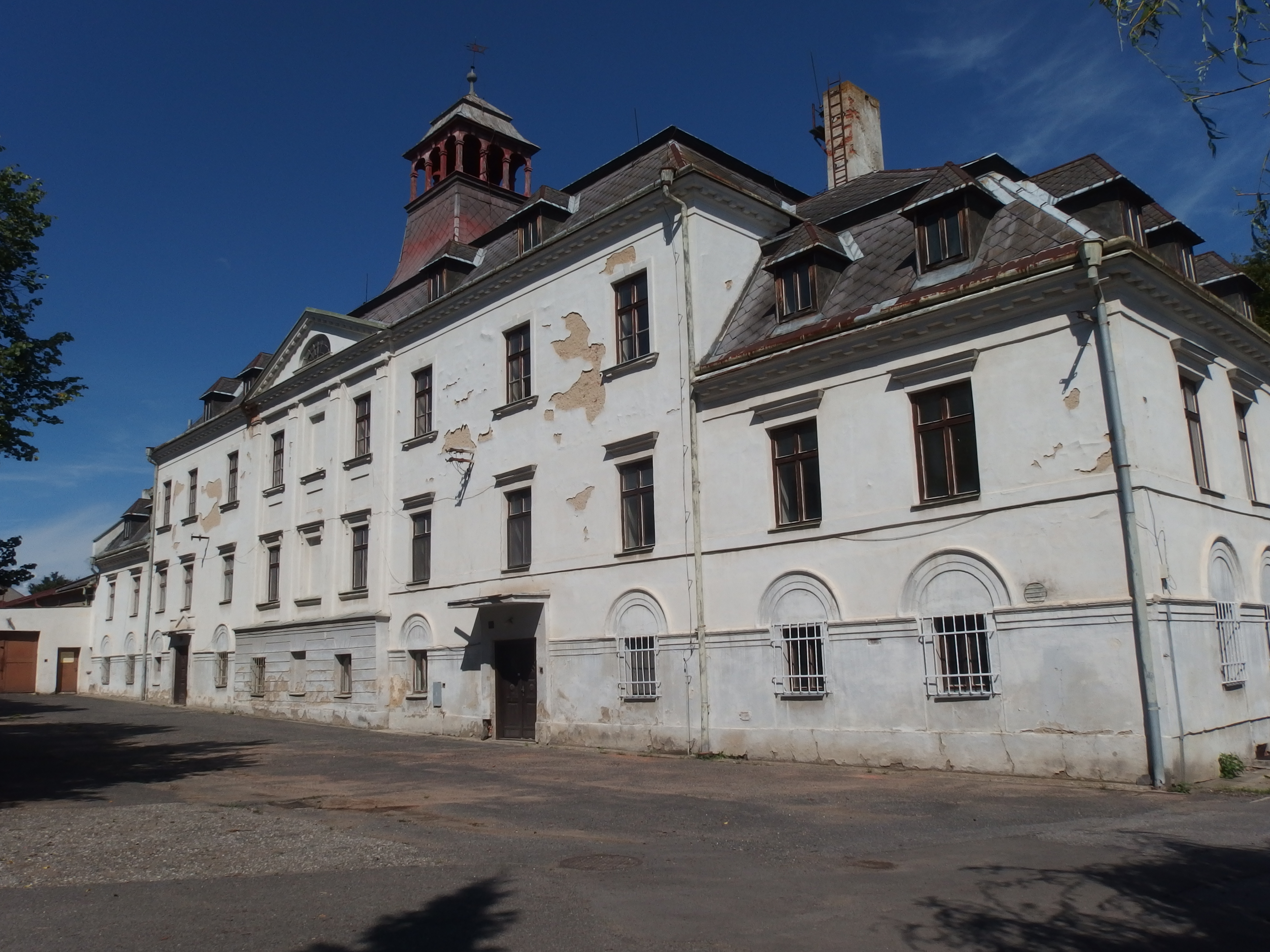
- Stěbořice Castle

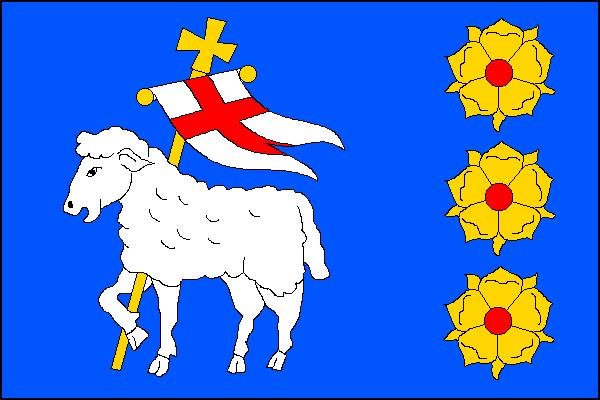
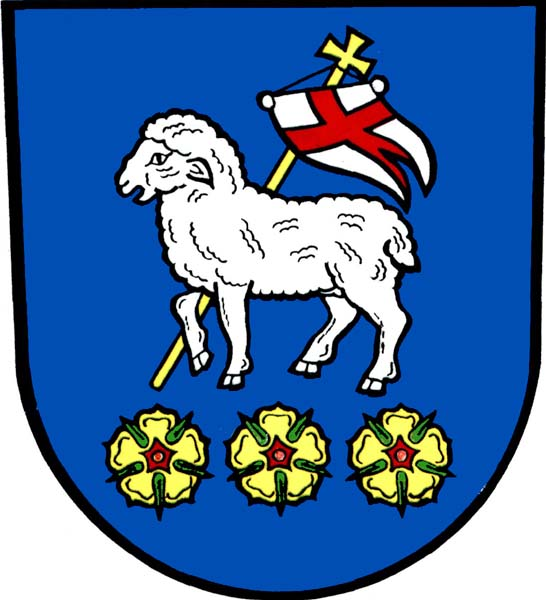
- Flag Coat of arms

- Location in the Czech Republic
- Coordinates: 49°56′13″N 17°48′20″E
- Country: Czech Republic
- Region: Moravian-Silesian
- District: Opava
- First mentioned: 1220

Area
  - Total: 17.76 km^{2} (6.86 sq mi)
- Elevation: 295 m (968 ft)

Population (2026-01-01)
  - Total: 1,448
  - Density: 81.53/km^{2} (211.2/sq mi)
- Time zone: UTC+1 (CET)
  - Summer (DST): UTC+2 (CEST)
- Postal code: 747 51
- Website: www.steborice.cz

Stěbořice is a municipality and village in Opava District in the Moravian-Silesian Region of the Czech Republic. It has about 1,400 inhabitants.

== Administrative division ==
Stěbořice consists of three municipal parts (in brackets population according to the 2021 census):

- Stěbořice (881)
- Jamnice (271)
- Nový Dvůr (239)

== History ==
The first written mention of Stěbořice is from 1220.

== Demographics ==
Historical population
Year	Pop.	±%
1869	1,148	—
1880	1,304	+13.6%
1890	1,348	+3.4%
1900	1,358	+0.7%
1910	1,394	+2.7%
1921	1,274	−8.6%
1930	1,325	+4.0%
1950	1,190	−10.2%
1961	1,200	+0.8%
1970	1,253	+4.4%
1980	1,281	+2.2%
1991	1,310	+2.3%
2001	1,310	+0.0%
2011	1,357	+3.6%
2021	1,391	+2.5%
Source: Censuses

== Sights ==
In Nový Dvůr is the Nový Dvůr Arboretum, administered by the Silesian Museum in Opava.
