= Močerady =

- Municipality
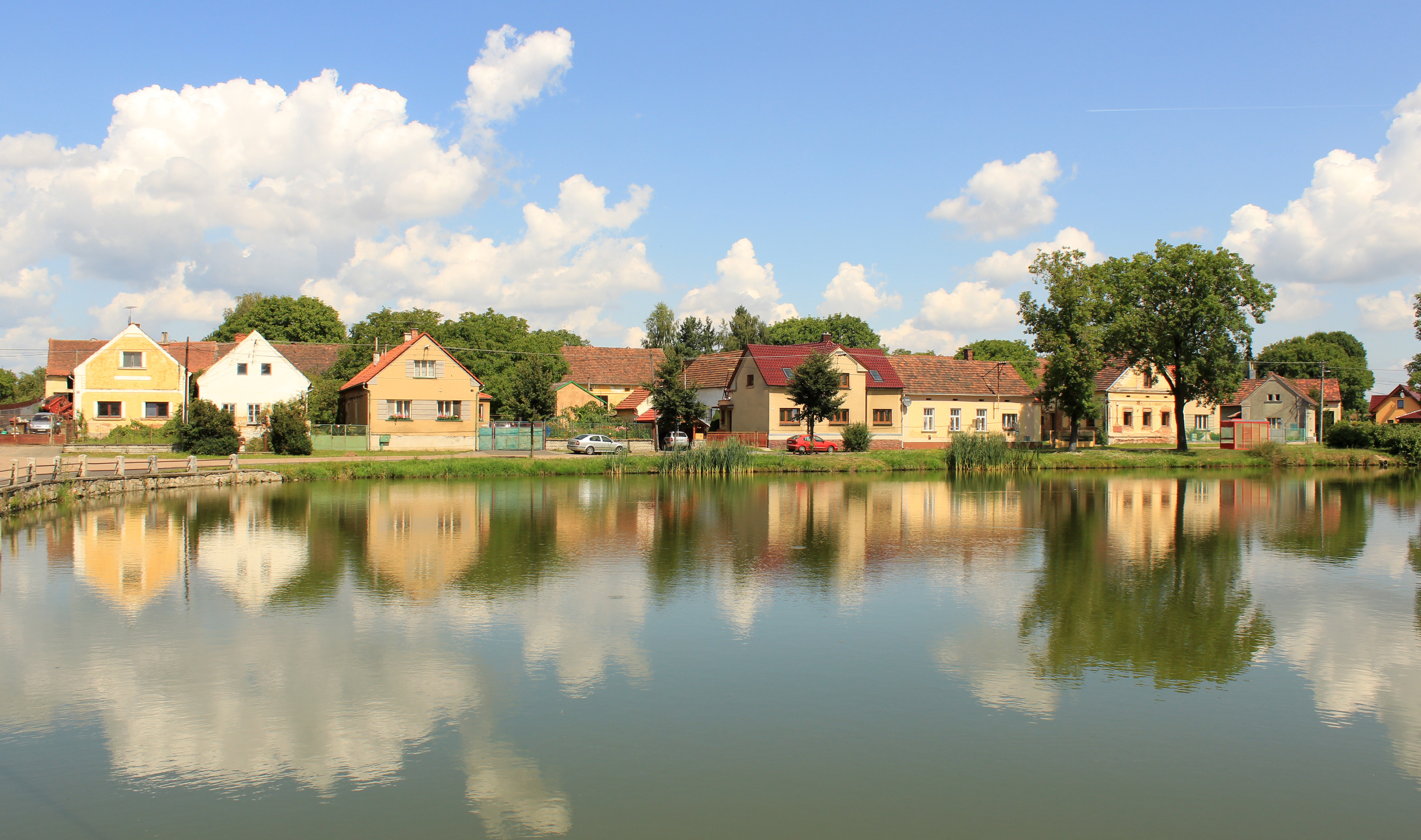
- Pond in the centre of Močerady

- Location in the Czech Republic
- Coordinates: 49°31′3″N 13°4′28″E
- Country: Czech Republic
- Region: Plzeň
- District: Domažlice
- First mentioned: 1115

Area
  - Total: 6.67 km^{2} (2.58 sq mi)
- Elevation: 428 m (1,404 ft)

Population (2026-01-01)
  - Total: 71
  - Density: 11/km^{2} (28/sq mi)
- Time zone: UTC+1 (CET)
  - Summer (DST): UTC+2 (CEST)
- Postal code: 345 61
- Website: www.mocerady.cz

Močerady is a municipality and village in Domažlice District in the Plzeň Region of the Czech Republic. It has about 70 inhabitants.

Močerady lies approximately 13 kilometres (8 mi) north-east of Domažlice, 35 km (22 mi) south-west of Plzeň, and 117 km (73 mi) south-west of Prague.

== Administrative division ==
Močerady consists of two municipal parts (in brackets population according to the 2021 census):

- Močerady (51)
- Nové Dvory (5)

== Demographics ==
Historical population
Year	Pop.	±%
1869	219	—
1880	270	+23.3%
1890	258	−4.4%
1900	290	+12.4%
1910	345	+19.0%
1921	337	−2.3%
1930	292	−13.4%
1950	188	−35.6%
1961	168	−10.6%
1970	131	−22.0%
1980	114	−13.0%
1991	90	−21.1%
2001	80	−11.1%
2011	60	−25.0%
2021	56	−6.7%
Source: Censuses
