= Silesian Museum (Opava) =

Museum in Opava, Czech Republic

- Slezské zemské muzeum

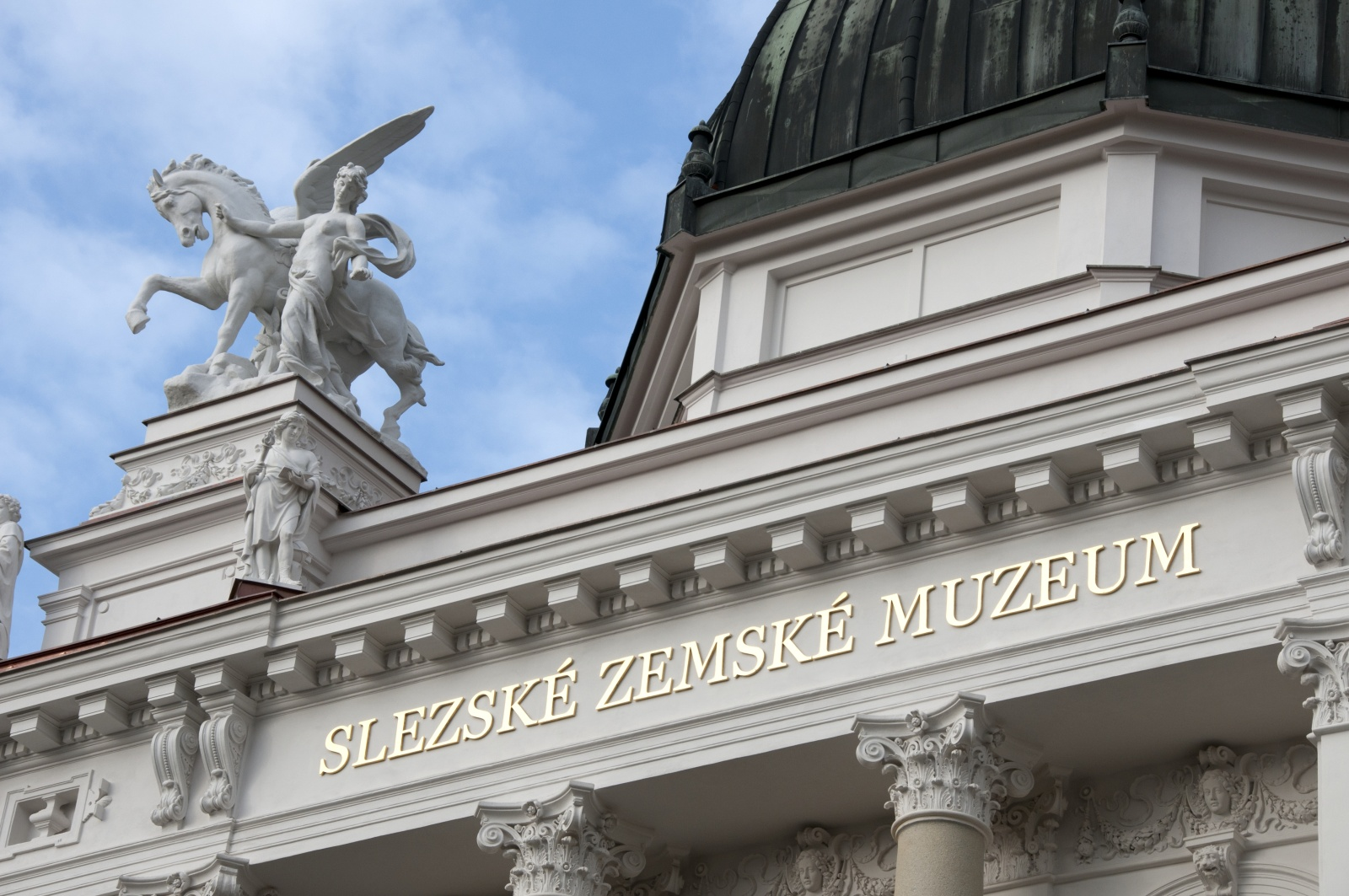
- The entrance to the main museum
- Established: 1 May 1814
- Location: Opava
- Coordinates: 49.9374°N 17.9083°E
- Collection size: 2,400,000 artefacts
- Founders: Professor Faustin Ens, Franz Mückusch von Buchberg and Johann Joseph Schößler
- Website: Silesian Museum

The Silesian Museum (Czech: Slezské zemské muzeum) in Opava is the oldest and the third largest museum in the Czech Republic. The museum also manages other heritage sites.

== History ==
The main museum was founded on 1 May 1814 by three people, Professor Faustin Ens, Franz Mückusch von Buchberg and the mayor of Opava Johann Joseph Schößler. The museum was placed into a building that was a grammar school and the new collection was known as the Museum Gymnazijni. During the nineteenth century three more museums were founded in the town. After the first world war the Czechoslovak state created a Silesian Museum and an Agricultural Museum was started in 1924 and a Leigionnaires Museum dedicated to the spirit of resistance.

This multitude of museums was partially simplified in 1939 when the Museum Gymnazijni and the Silesian Museum were merged as the Reichsgaumuseum. At the end of the war this museum's collections gained artefacts from nearby buildings and the confiscated property of German people. In 1949 the Reichsgaumuseum was given its last name change when it became this Silesian Museum.

The museum's current authority comes from a document dated 27 December 2000.

== Description ==
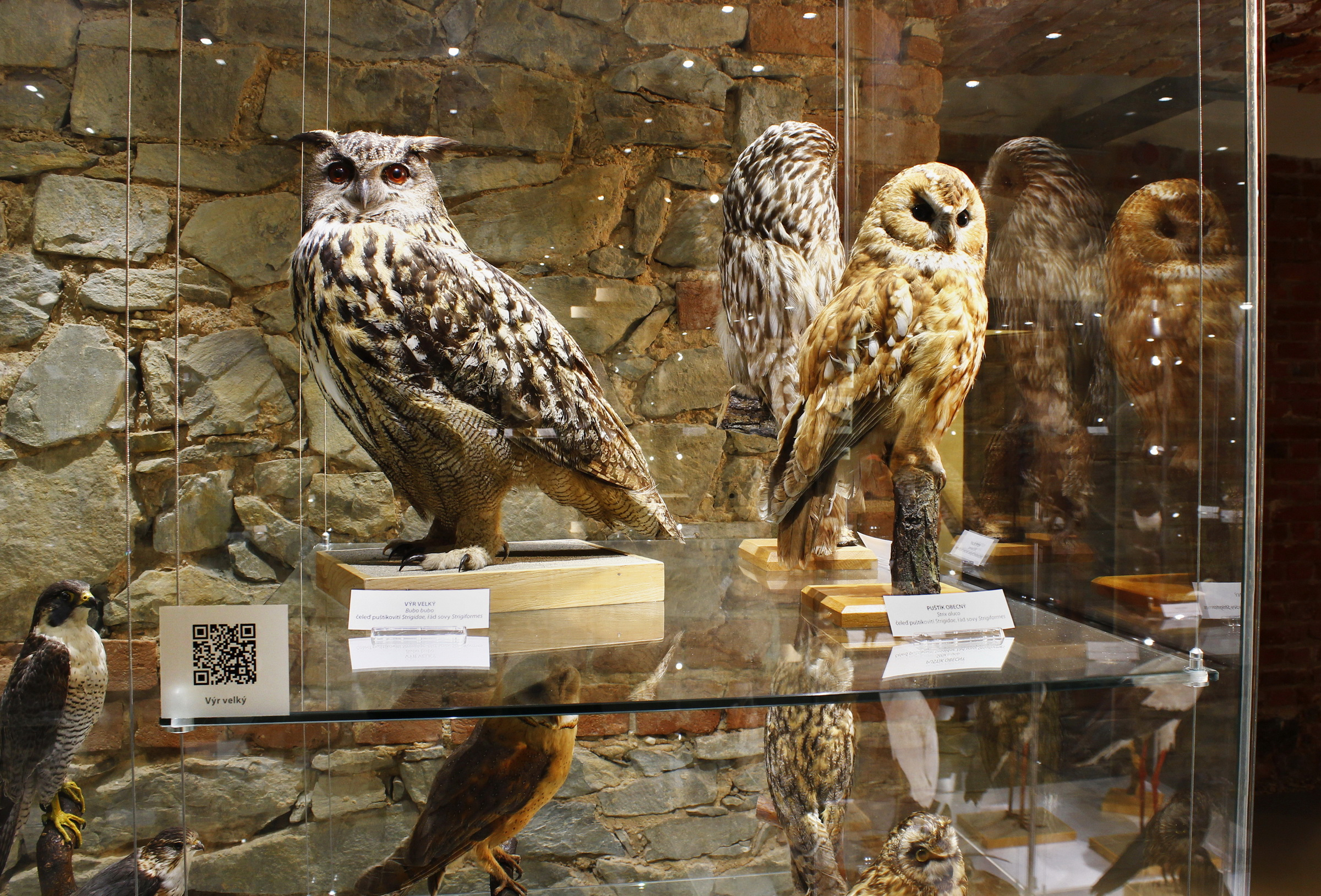
Owl exhibition

The museum is the third largest museum in the Czech Republic and it has 2,400,000 artefacts. The museum cares for a number exhibits which are distributed at different locations. The museum is in charge of an arboretum, a large war memorial, a preserved fortification and a poet's birthplace.

== The war memorial ==
The war memorial commemorates a large battle of the World War II between Nazi Germany and Russia and its allies. 13,000 names are recorded there in the village of Hrabyně. These are not just the names of soldiers but also of civilians from Silesia and North Moravia lost during the war.

== The Hlučín-Darkovičky Czechoslovak Fortification Complex ==
The complex, located in Hlučín, is a series of five different forfications that were designed to sit on the Czech border during the first half of the twentieth century. They are an important example of the defences available during the World War II. These fortifications have been under the management of the Silesian museum since 1992.

== The Petr Bezruč memorial ==
This exhibition is based at the Czech poet Petr Bezruč's birthplace. Bezruc published poetry including Silesian Songs. The building where he was born was lost to the damage of the second world war but another building has been built at that site in 1956 and the museum also owns his holiday chalet in Ostravice.

== The Nový Dvůr Arboretum ==
The Nový Dvůr Arboretum in Stěbořice is part of the museum and it includes 7,000 different species from five continents which are spread over 23 hectares. There are also 200 square metres of greenhouse space which although small includes both tropical and sub-tropical climates. These extend the range of plants of the arboretum to also include trees and plants that require the climates of Africa, Asia, America and Australasia.
