= Jivina =

Jivina may refer to places in the Czech Republic:

- Jivina (Beroun District), a municipality and village in the Central Bohemian Region
- Jivina (Mladá Boleslav District), a municipality and village in the Central Bohemian Region
- Jivina, a hamlet and part of Troskovice in the Liberec Region
- Jivina, a village and part of Vlastibořice in the Liberec Region
