= Korno =

- Municipality
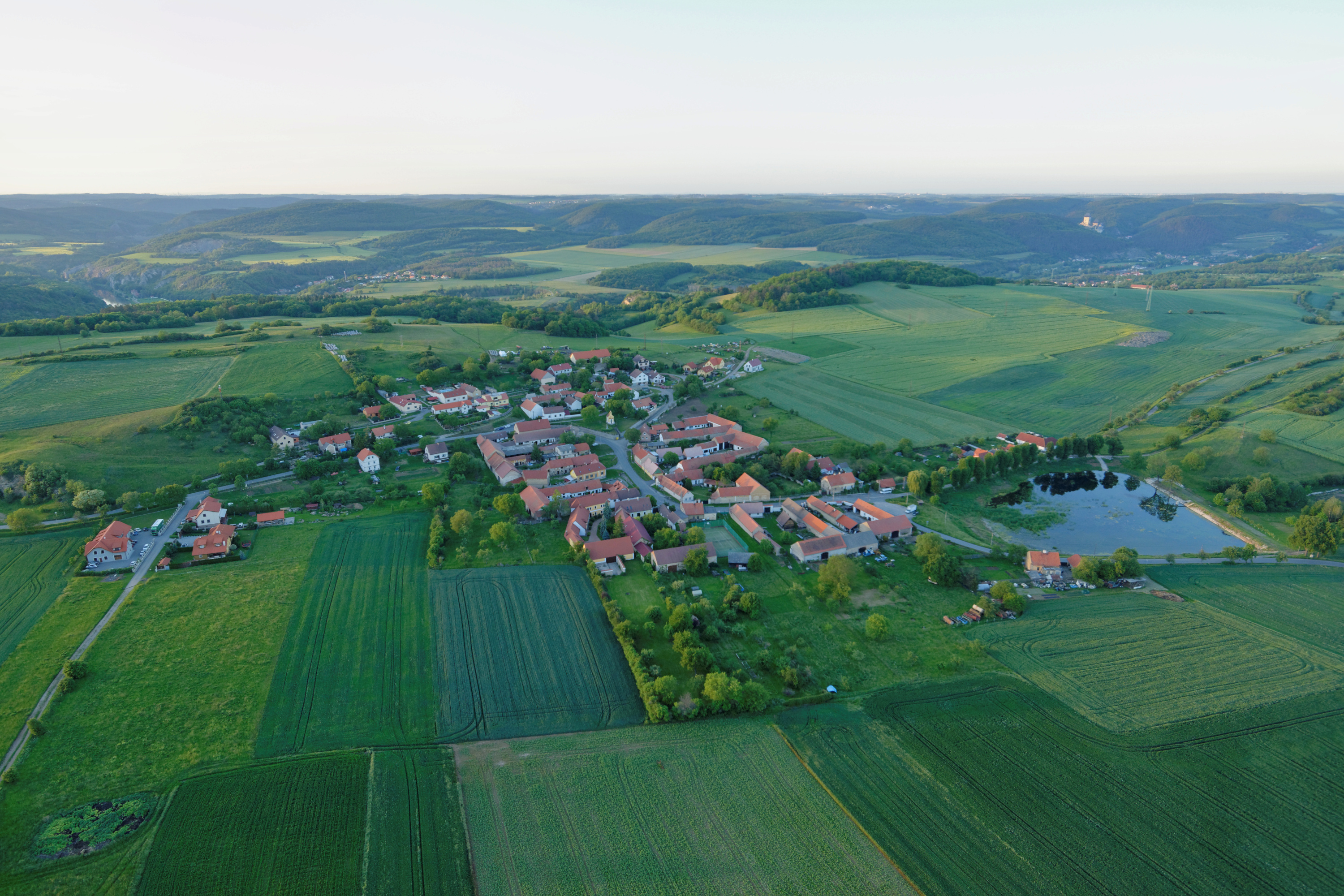
- Aerial view

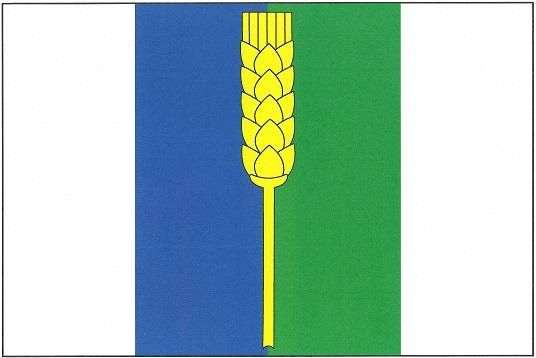
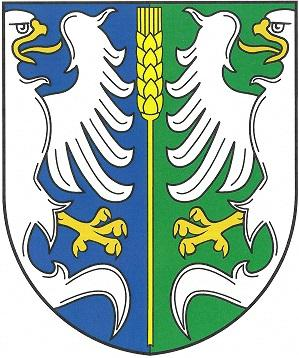
- Flag Coat of arms

- Location in the Czech Republic
- Coordinates: 49°55′14″N 14°8′13″E
- Country: Czech Republic
- Region: Central Bohemian
- District: Beroun
- First mentioned: 1360

Area
  - Total: 5.18 km^{2} (2.00 sq mi)
- Elevation: 350 m (1,150 ft)

Population (2026-01-01)
  - Total: 119
  - Density: 23.0/km^{2} (59.5/sq mi)
- Time zone: UTC+1 (CET)
  - Summer (DST): UTC+2 (CEST)
- Postal code: 267 27
- Website: www.korno.cz

Korno is a municipality and village in Beroun District in the Central Bohemian Region of the Czech Republic. It has about 100 inhabitants.

== Demographics ==
Historical population
| Year | Pop. | ±% |
|---|---|---|
| 1869 | 210 | — |
| 1880 | 221 | +5.2% |
| 1890 | 203 | −8.1% |
| 1900 | 209 | +3.0% |
| 1910 | 229 | +9.6% |
| 1921 | 221 | −3.5% |
| 1930 | 201 | −9.0% |
| 1950 | 200 | −0.5% |
| 1961 | 126 | −37.0% |
| 1970 | 122 | −3.2% |
| 1980 | 113 | −7.4% |
| 1991 | 82 | −27.4% |
| 2001 | 91 | +11.0% |
| 2011 | 97 | +6.6% |
| 2021 | 128 | +32.0% |
Source: Censuses
