= Lhotka (Beroun District) =

- Municipality
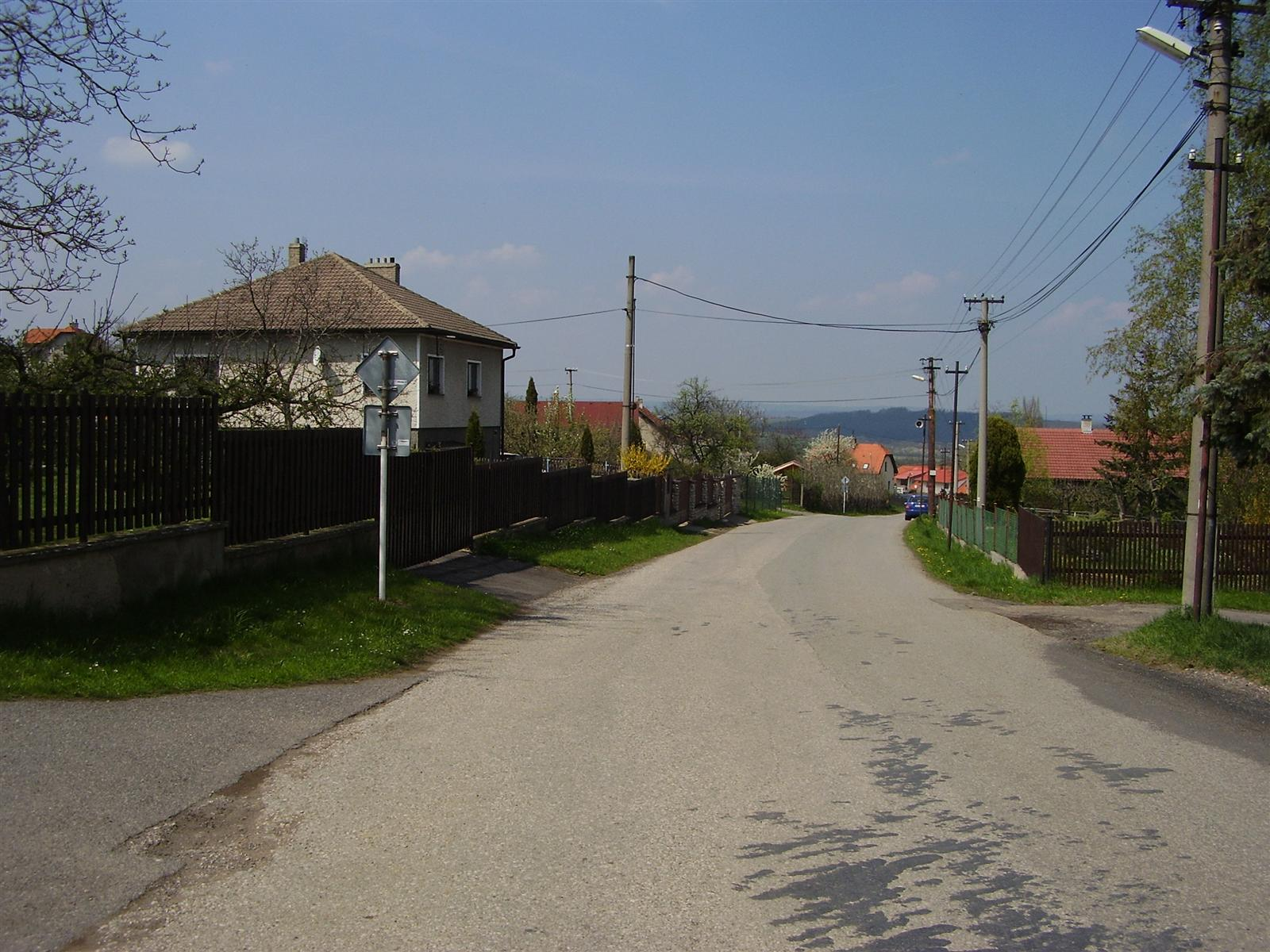
- Main street

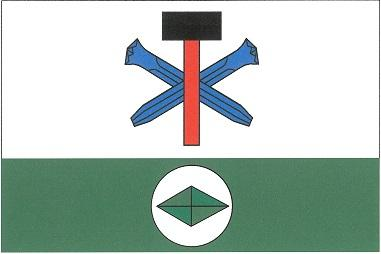
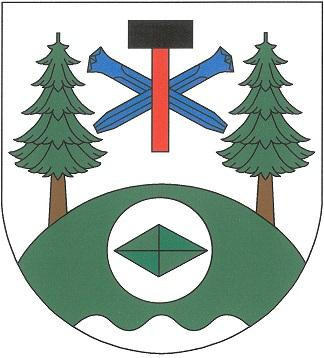
- Flag Coat of arms

- Location in the Czech Republic
- Coordinates: 49°49′56″N 13°59′47″E
- Country: Czech Republic
- Region: Central Bohemian
- District: Beroun
- First mentioned: 1547

Area
  - Total: 5.34 km^{2} (2.06 sq mi)
- Elevation: 403 m (1,322 ft)

Population (2026-01-01)
  - Total: 372
  - Density: 69.7/km^{2} (180/sq mi)
- Time zone: UTC+1 (CET)
  - Summer (DST): UTC+2 (CEST)
- Postal code: 267 23
- Website: www.oulhotka.cz

Lhotka is a municipality and village in Beroun District in the Central Bohemian Region of the Czech Republic. It has about 400 inhabitants.

== Demographics ==
Historical population
Year	Pop.	±%
1869	440	—
1880	421	−4.3%
1890	432	+2.6%
1900	509	+17.8%
1910	496	−2.6%
1921	435	−12.3%
1930	455	+4.6%
1950	364	−20.0%
1961	368	+1.1%
1970	335	−9.0%
1980	320	−4.5%
1991	268	−16.2%
2001	286	+6.7%
2011	309	+8.0%
2021	363	+17.5%
Source: Censuses
