= Málkov (Beroun District) =

- Municipality
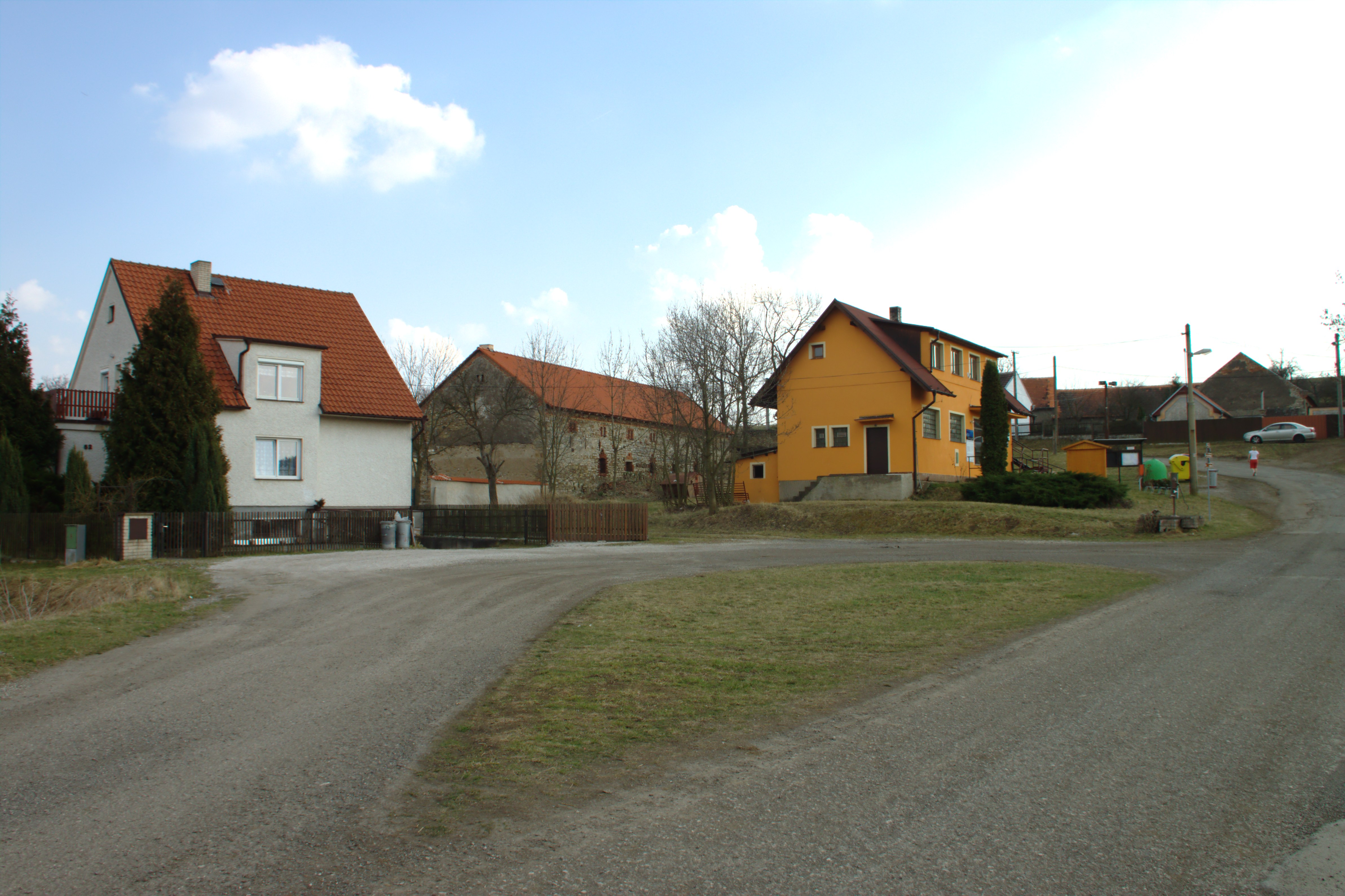
- Centre of Málkov

- Flag Coat of arms

- Location in the Czech Republic
- Coordinates: 49°53′18″N 14°1′25″E
- Country: Czech Republic
- Region: Central Bohemian
- District: Beroun
- First mentioned: 1548

Area
  - Total: 3.40 km^{2} (1.31 sq mi)
- Elevation: 390 m (1,280 ft)

Population (2026-01-01)
  - Total: 119
  - Density: 35.0/km^{2} (90.6/sq mi)
- Time zone: UTC+1 (CET)
  - Summer (DST): UTC+2 (CEST)
- Postal code: 267 01
- Website: www.obecmalkov.cz

Málkov is a municipality and village in Beroun District in the Central Bohemian Region of the Czech Republic. It has about 100 inhabitants.

== Demographics ==
Historical population
Year	Pop.	±%
1869	238	—
1880	264	+10.9%
1890	249	−5.7%
1900	252	+1.2%
1910	226	−10.3%
1921	220	−2.7%
1930	200	−9.1%
1950	166	−17.0%
1961	150	−9.6%
1970	157	+4.7%
1980	130	−17.2%
1991	98	−24.6%
2001	87	−11.2%
2011	109	+25.3%
2021	99	−9.2%
Source: Censuses
