= Podbrdy =

- Municipality
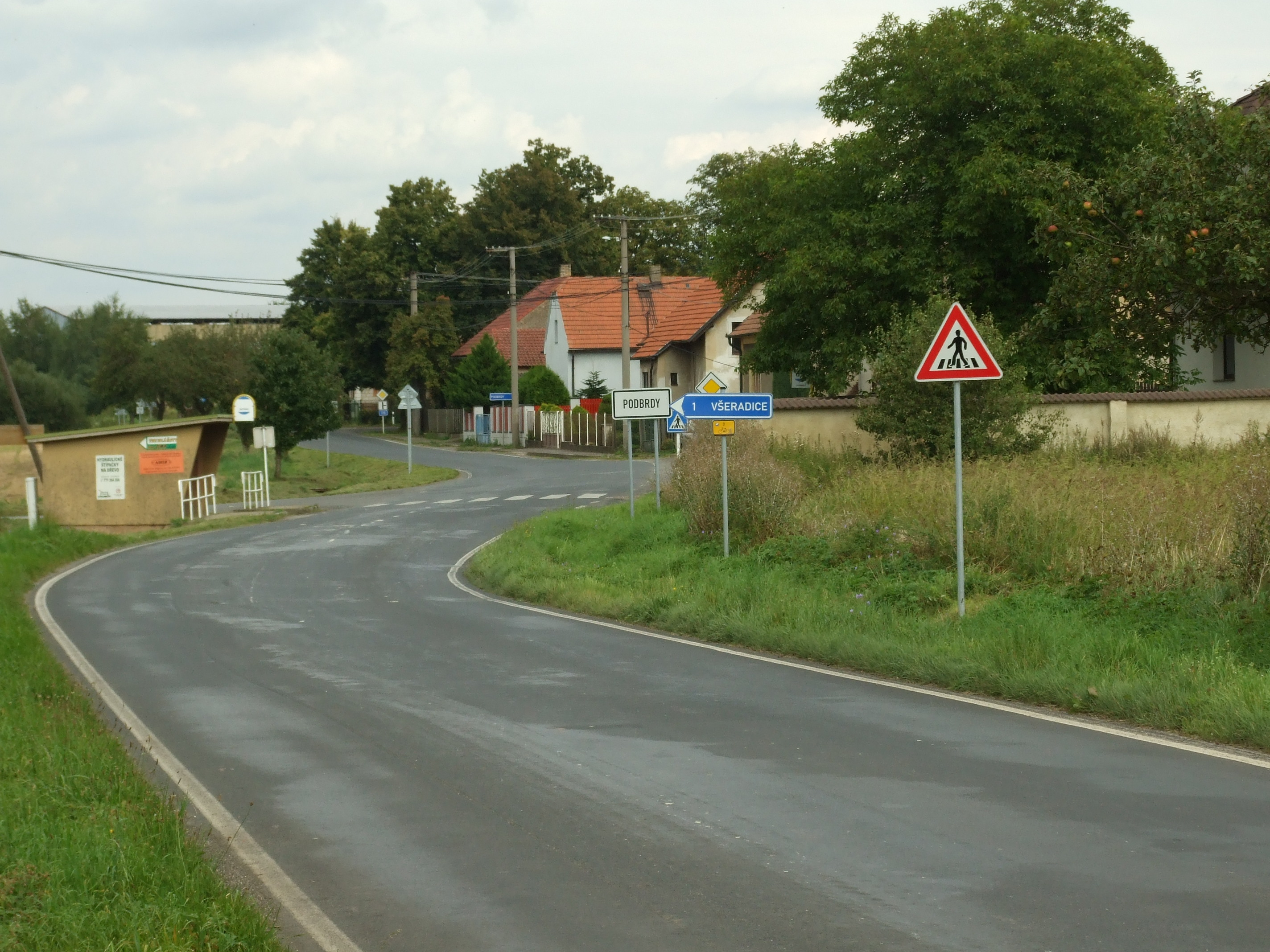
- Entrance to Podbrdy

- Location in the Czech Republic
- Coordinates: 49°51′47″N 14°7′36″E
- Country: Czech Republic
- Region: Central Bohemian
- District: Beroun
- First mentioned: 1788

Area
  - Total: 3.78 km^{2} (1.46 sq mi)
- Elevation: 350 m (1,150 ft)

Population (2026-01-01)
  - Total: 254
  - Density: 67.2/km^{2} (174/sq mi)
- Time zone: UTC+1 (CET)
  - Summer (DST): UTC+2 (CEST)
- Postal code: 267 27
- Website: www.podbrdy.cz

Podbrdy is a municipality and village in Beroun District in the Central Bohemian Region of the Czech Republic. It has about 300 inhabitants.

== Demographics ==
Historical population
| Year | Pop. | ±% |
|---|---|---|
| 1869 | 302 | — |
| 1880 | 268 | −11.3% |
| 1890 | 272 | +1.5% |
| 1900 | 281 | +3.3% |
| 1910 | 236 | −16.0% |
| 1921 | 228 | −3.4% |
| 1930 | 234 | +2.6% |
| 1950 | 204 | −12.8% |
| 1961 | 226 | +10.8% |
| 1970 | 198 | −12.4% |
| 1980 | 163 | −17.7% |
| 1991 | 163 | +0.0% |
| 2001 | 155 | −4.9% |
| 2011 | 201 | +29.7% |
| 2021 | 225 | +11.9% |
Source: Censuses
