= Otmíče =

- Municipality
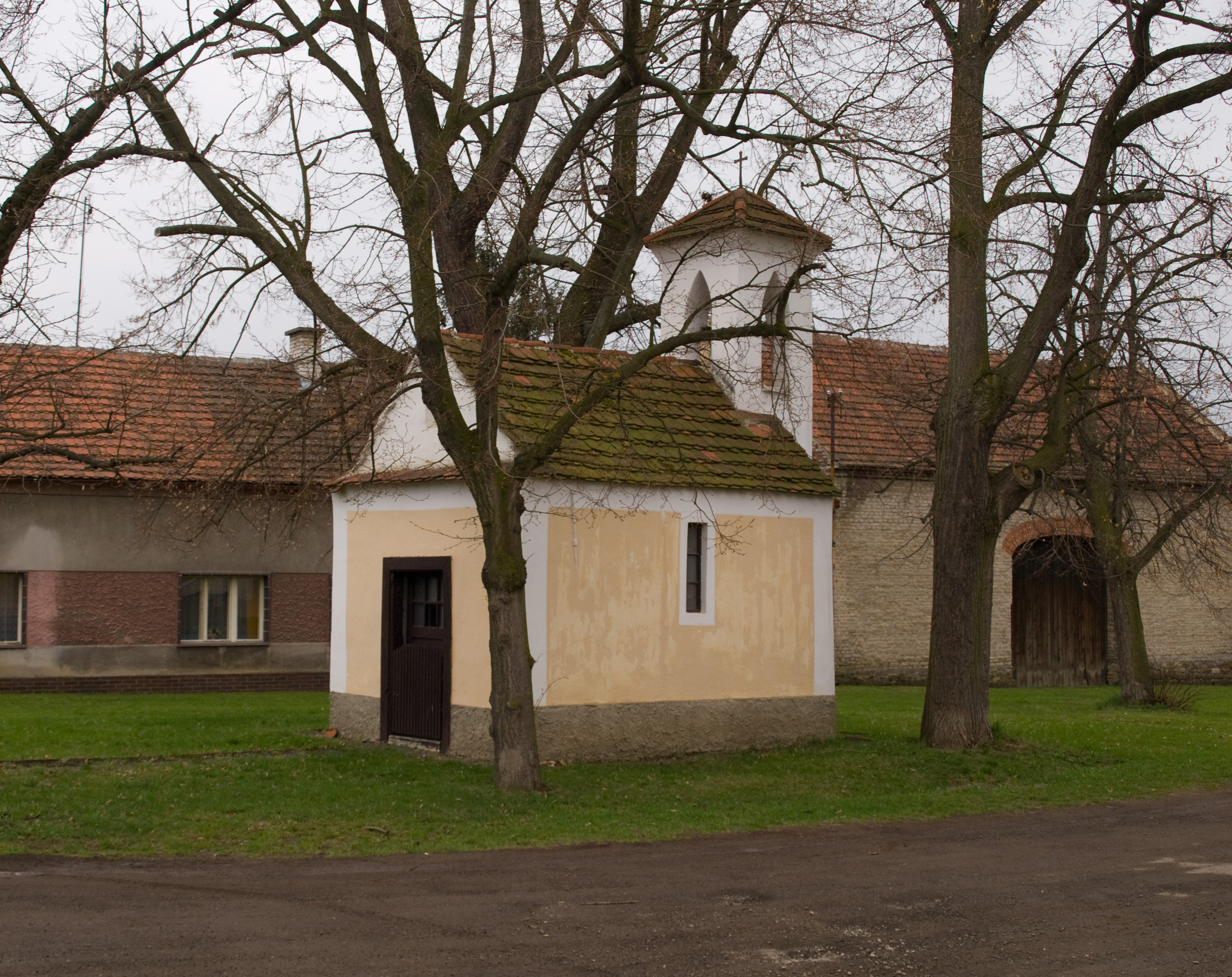
- Chapel of Saint John of Nepomuk

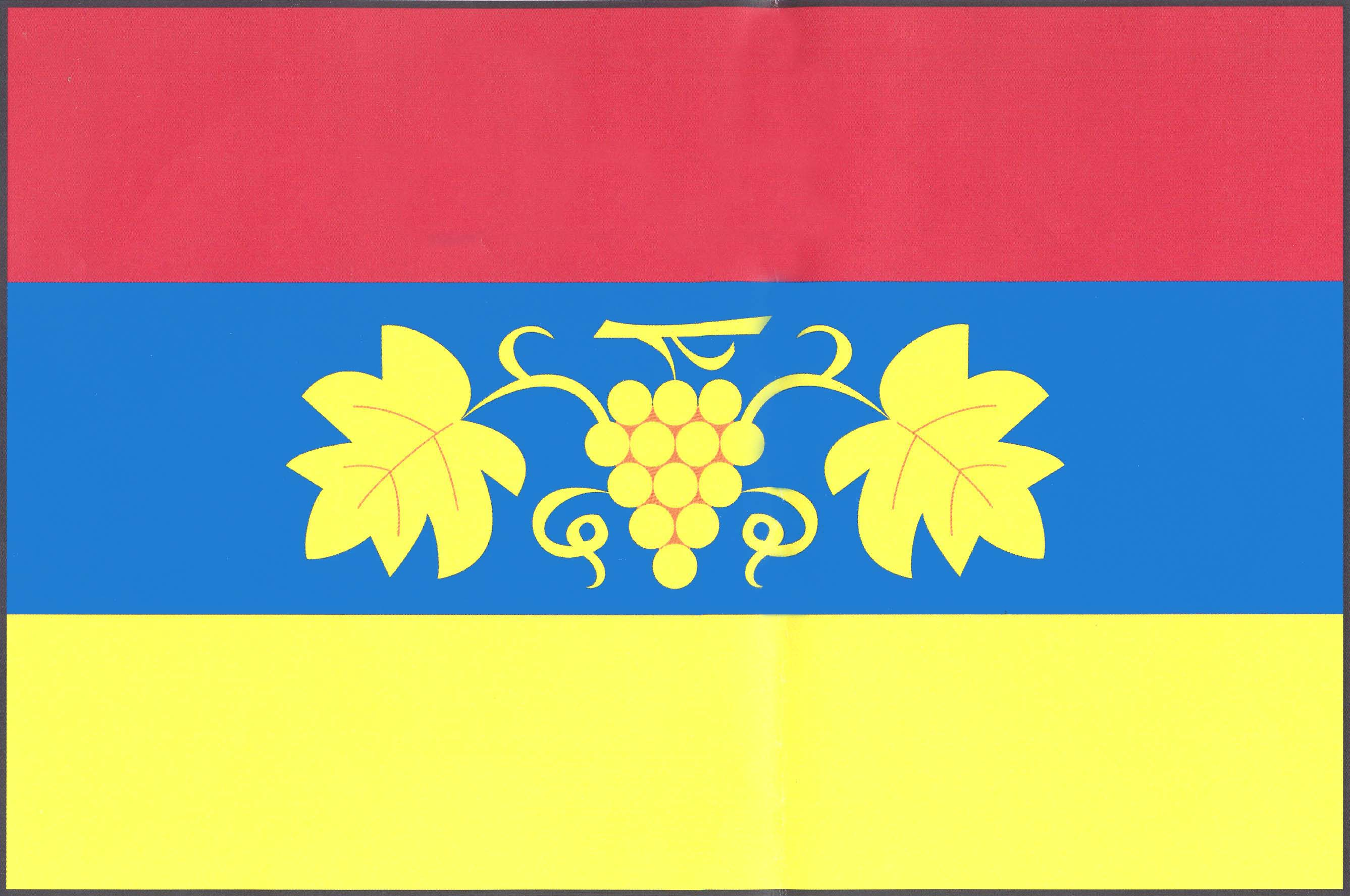
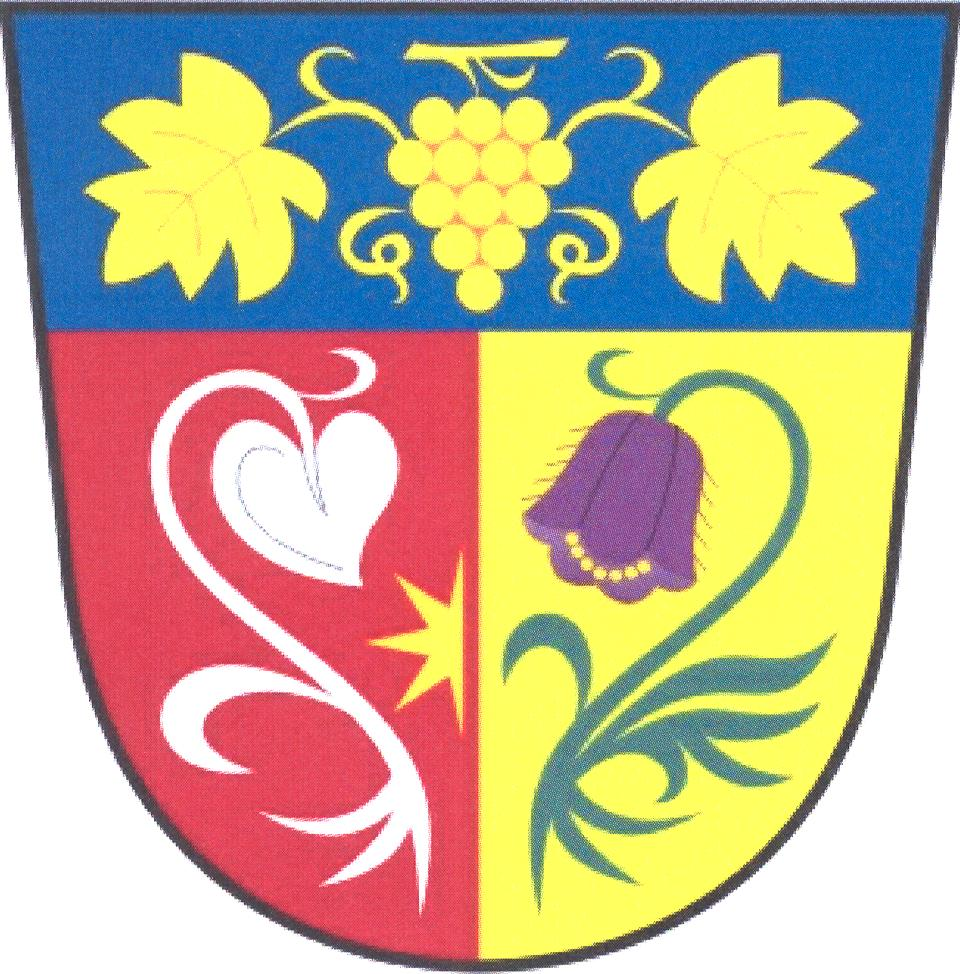
- Flag Coat of arms

- Location in the Czech Republic
- Coordinates: 49°52′9″N 13°56′50″E
- Country: Czech Republic
- Region: Central Bohemian
- District: Beroun
- First mentioned: 1227

Area
  - Total: 2.62 km^{2} (1.01 sq mi)
- Elevation: 314 m (1,030 ft)

Population (2026-01-01)
  - Total: 188
  - Density: 71.8/km^{2} (186/sq mi)
- Time zone: UTC+1 (CET)
  - Summer (DST): UTC+2 (CEST)
- Postal code: 267 51
- Website: otmice.cz

Otmíče is a municipality and village in Beroun District in the Central Bohemian Region of the Czech Republic. It has about 200 inhabitants.

== Demographics ==
Historical population
Year	Pop.	±%
1869	201	—
1880	210	+4.5%
1890	215	+2.4%
1900	251	+16.7%
1910	237	−5.6%
1921	224	−5.5%
1930	251	+12.1%
1950	171	−31.9%
1961	205	+19.9%
1970	174	−15.1%
1980	157	−9.8%
1991	133	−15.3%
2001	144	+8.3%
2011	158	+9.7%
2021	189	+19.6%
Source: Censuses
