= Mezouň =

- Municipality
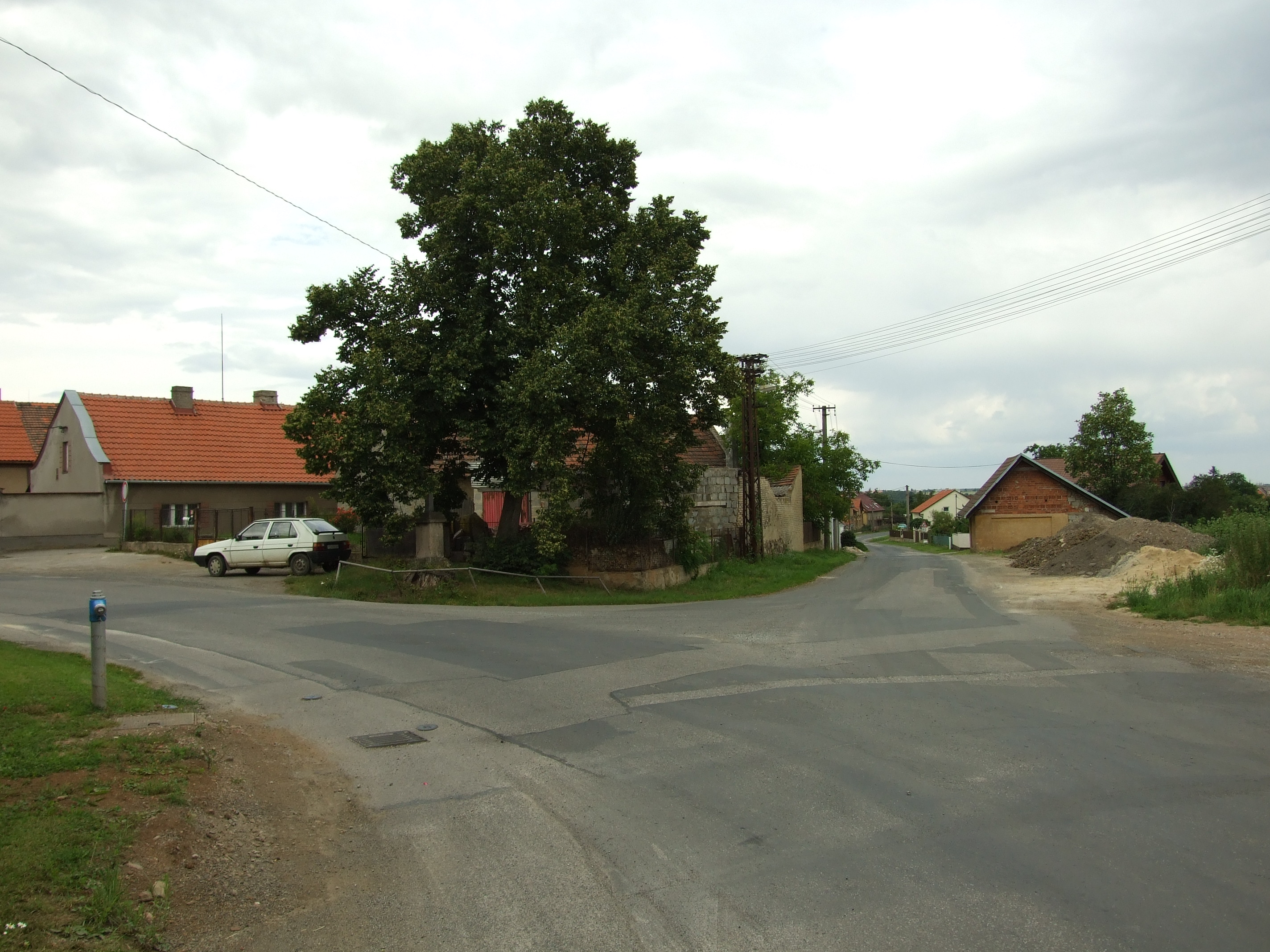
- Crossroads

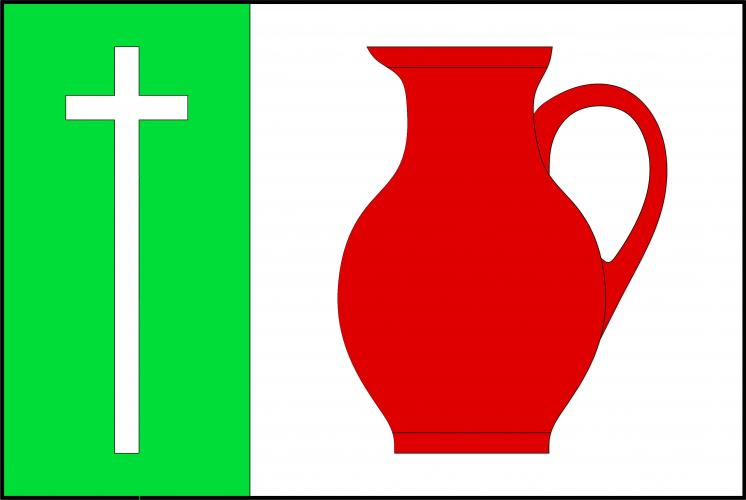
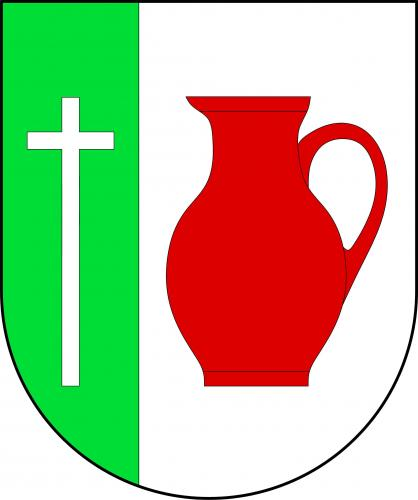
- Flag Coat of arms

- Location in the Czech Republic
- Coordinates: 50°0′16″N 14°12′51″E
- Country: Czech Republic
- Region: Central Bohemian
- District: Beroun
- First mentioned: 1025

Area
  - Total: 3.06 km^{2} (1.18 sq mi)
- Elevation: 380 m (1,250 ft)

Population (2026-01-01)
  - Total: 600
  - Density: 200/km^{2} (510/sq mi)
- Time zone: UTC+1 (CET)
  - Summer (DST): UTC+2 (CEST)
- Postal code: 267 18
- Website: www.mezoun.cz

Mezouň is a municipality and village in Beroun District in the Central Bohemian Region of the Czech Republic. It has about 600 inhabitants.

== Demographics ==
Historical population
| Year | Pop. | ±% |
|---|---|---|
| 1869 | 343 | — |
| 1880 | 368 | +7.3% |
| 1890 | 410 | +11.4% |
| 1900 | 475 | +15.9% |
| 1910 | 521 | +9.7% |
| 1921 | 480 | −7.9% |
| 1930 | 584 | +21.7% |
| 1950 | 531 | −9.1% |
| 1961 | 484 | −8.9% |
| 1970 | 465 | −3.9% |
| 1980 | 436 | −6.2% |
| 1991 | 397 | −8.9% |
| 2001 | 410 | +3.3% |
| 2011 | 541 | +32.0% |
| 2021 | 576 | +6.5% |
Source: Censuses
