= Chlustina =

- Municipality
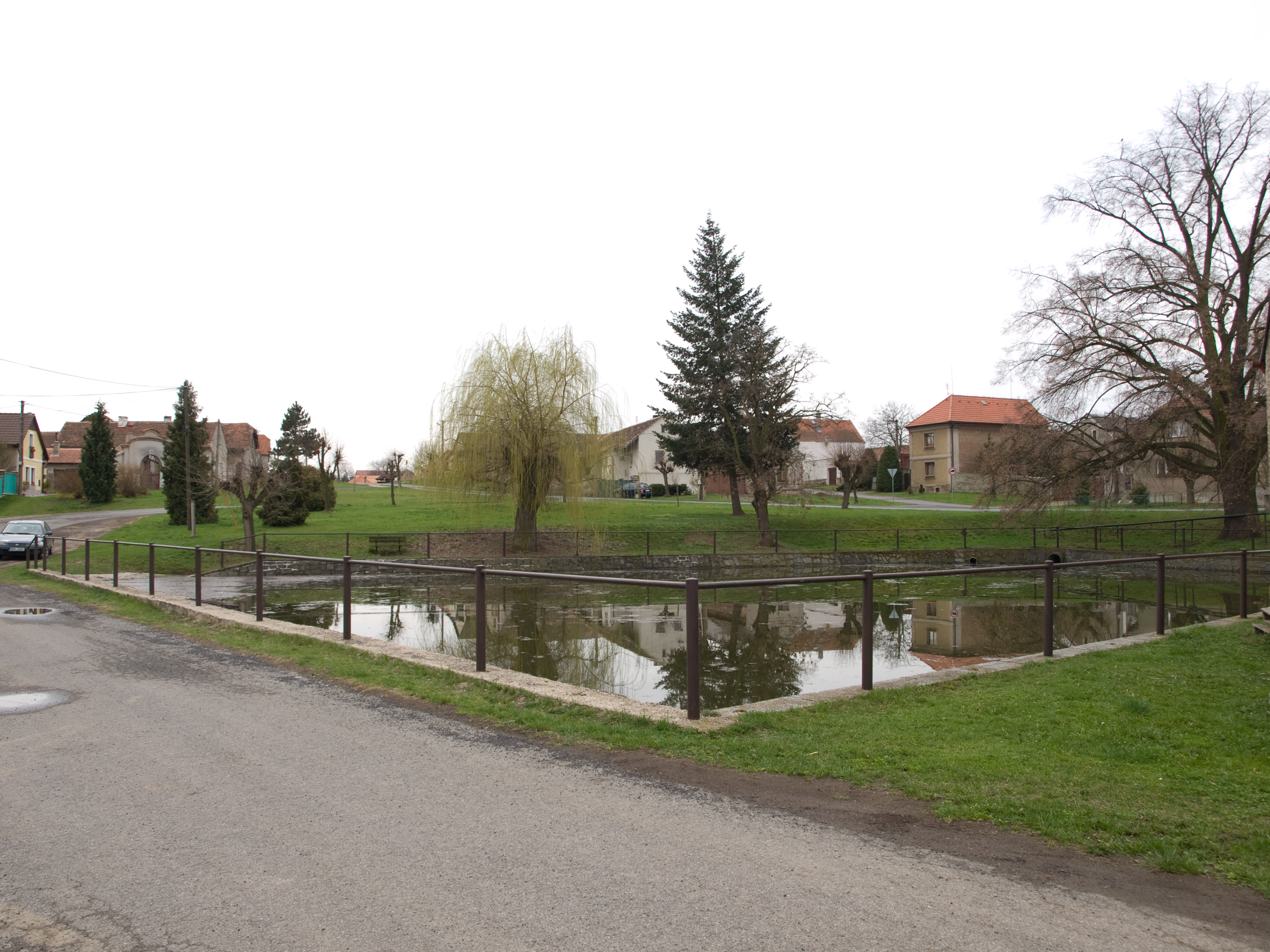
- Centre of Chlustina

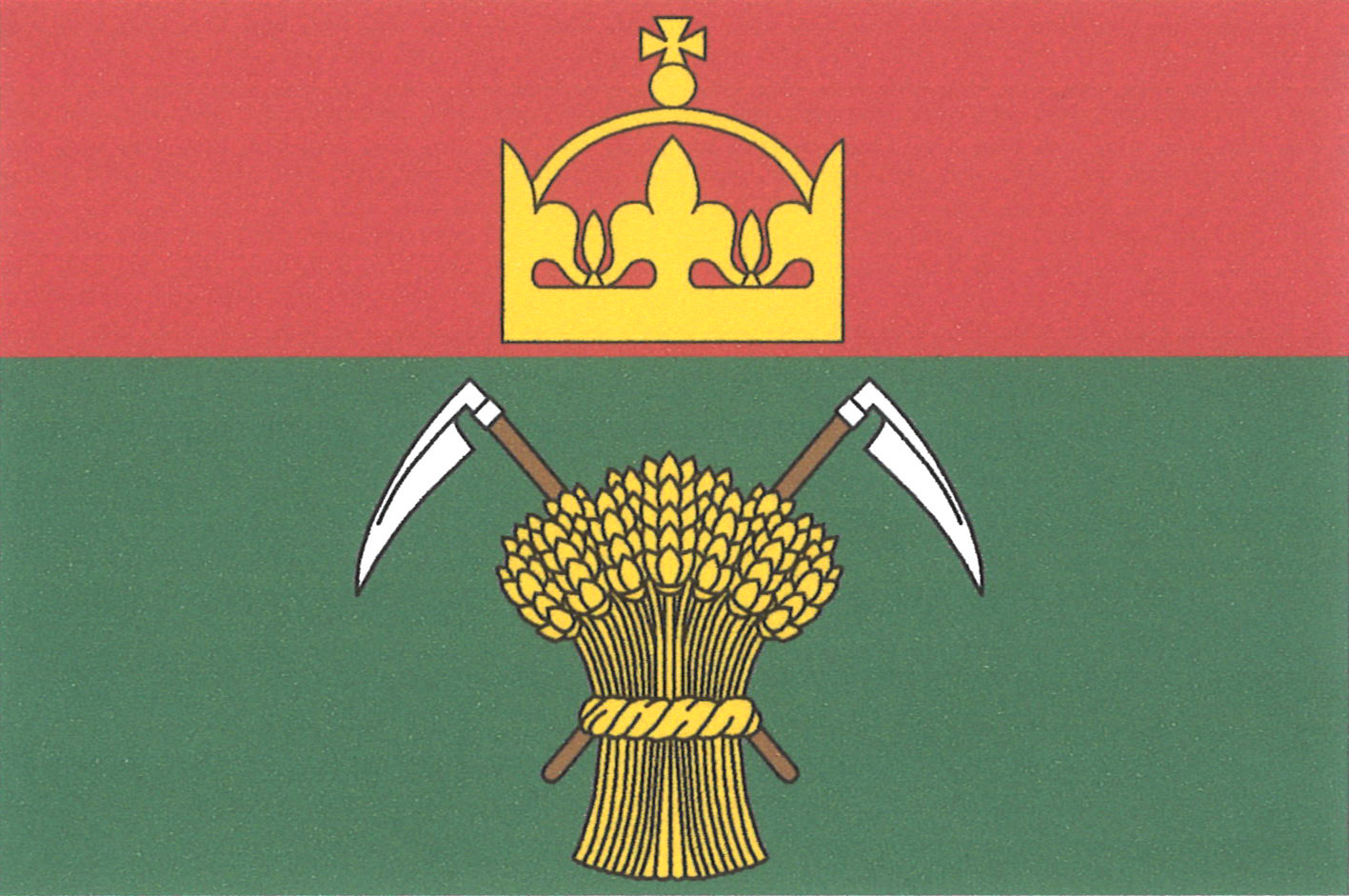
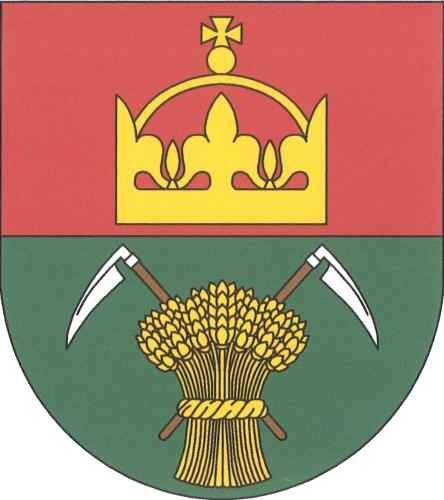
- Flag Coat of arms

- Location in the Czech Republic
- Coordinates: 49°52′41″N 13°55′10″E
- Country: Czech Republic
- Region: Central Bohemian
- District: Beroun
- First mentioned: 1170

Area
  - Total: 5.58 km^{2} (2.15 sq mi)
- Elevation: 340 m (1,120 ft)

Population (2026-01-01)
  - Total: 254
  - Density: 45.5/km^{2} (118/sq mi)
- Time zone: UTC+1 (CET)
  - Summer (DST): UTC+2 (CEST)
- Postal code: 267 51
- Website: www.chlustina.info

Chlustina is a municipality and village in Beroun District in the Central Bohemian Region of the Czech Republic. It has about 300 inhabitants.

== Demographics ==
Historical population
Year	Pop.	±%
1869	378	—
1880	423	+11.9%
1890	387	−8.5%
1900	398	+2.8%
1910	397	−0.3%
1921	387	−2.5%
1930	378	−2.3%
1950	326	−13.8%
1961	282	−13.5%
1970	268	−5.0%
1980	290	+8.2%
1991	205	−29.3%
2001	195	−4.9%
2011	220	+12.8%
2021	230	+4.5%
Source: Censuses
