= Podluhy =

- Municipality
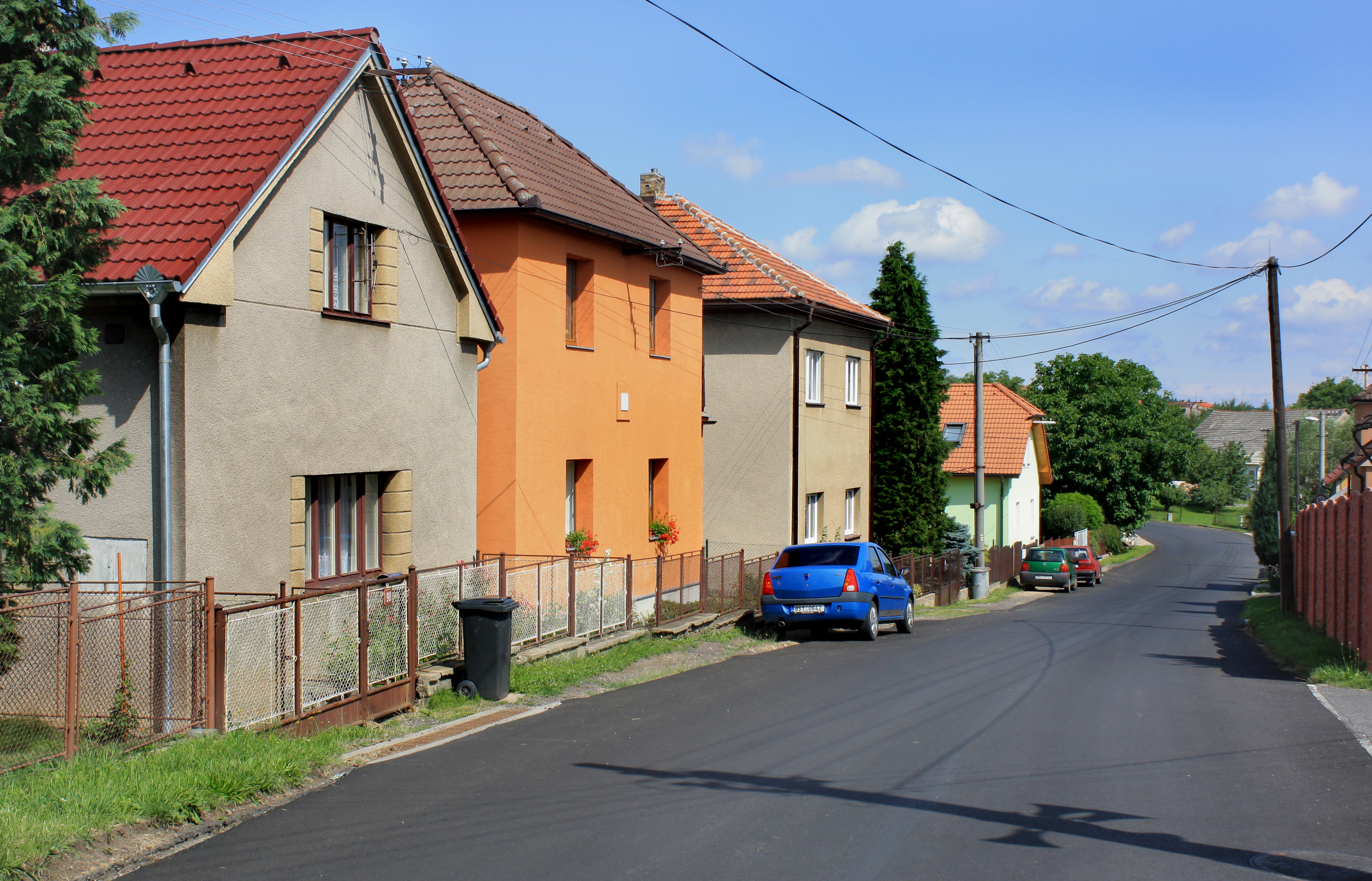
- Main street

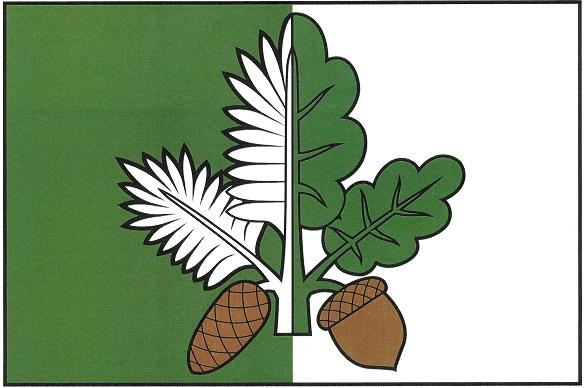
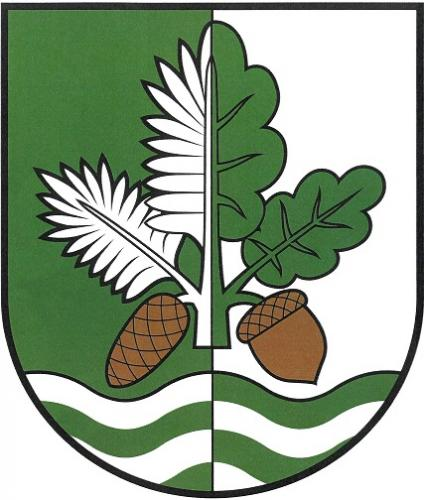
- Flag Coat of arms

- Location in the Czech Republic
- Coordinates: 49°48′57″N 13°54′49″E
- Country: Czech Republic
- Region: Central Bohemian
- District: Beroun
- First mentioned: 1331

Area
  - Total: 16.74 km^{2} (6.46 sq mi)
- Elevation: 400 m (1,300 ft)

Population (2026-01-01)
  - Total: 669
  - Density: 40.0/km^{2} (104/sq mi)
- Time zone: UTC+1 (CET)
  - Summer (DST): UTC+2 (CEST)
- Postal code: 268 01
- Website: www.obecpodluhy.cz

Podluhy is a municipality and village in Beroun District in the Central Bohemian Region of the Czech Republic. It has about 700 inhabitants.

Podluhy is located about 20 kilometres (12 mi) southwest of Beroun and 47 km (29 mi) southwest of Prague.

== History ==
The first written mention of Podluhy is from 1331.

== Demographics ==
Historical population
Year	Pop.	±%
1869	743	—
1880	652	−12.2%
1890	651	−0.2%
1900	712	+9.4%
1910	839	+17.8%
1921	792	−5.6%
1930	870	+9.8%
1950	755	−13.2%
1961	711	−5.8%
1970	660	−7.2%
1980	682	+3.3%
1991	562	−17.6%
2001	590	+5.0%
2011	634	+7.5%
2021	648	+2.2%
Source: Censuses
