= Broumy =

- Municipality
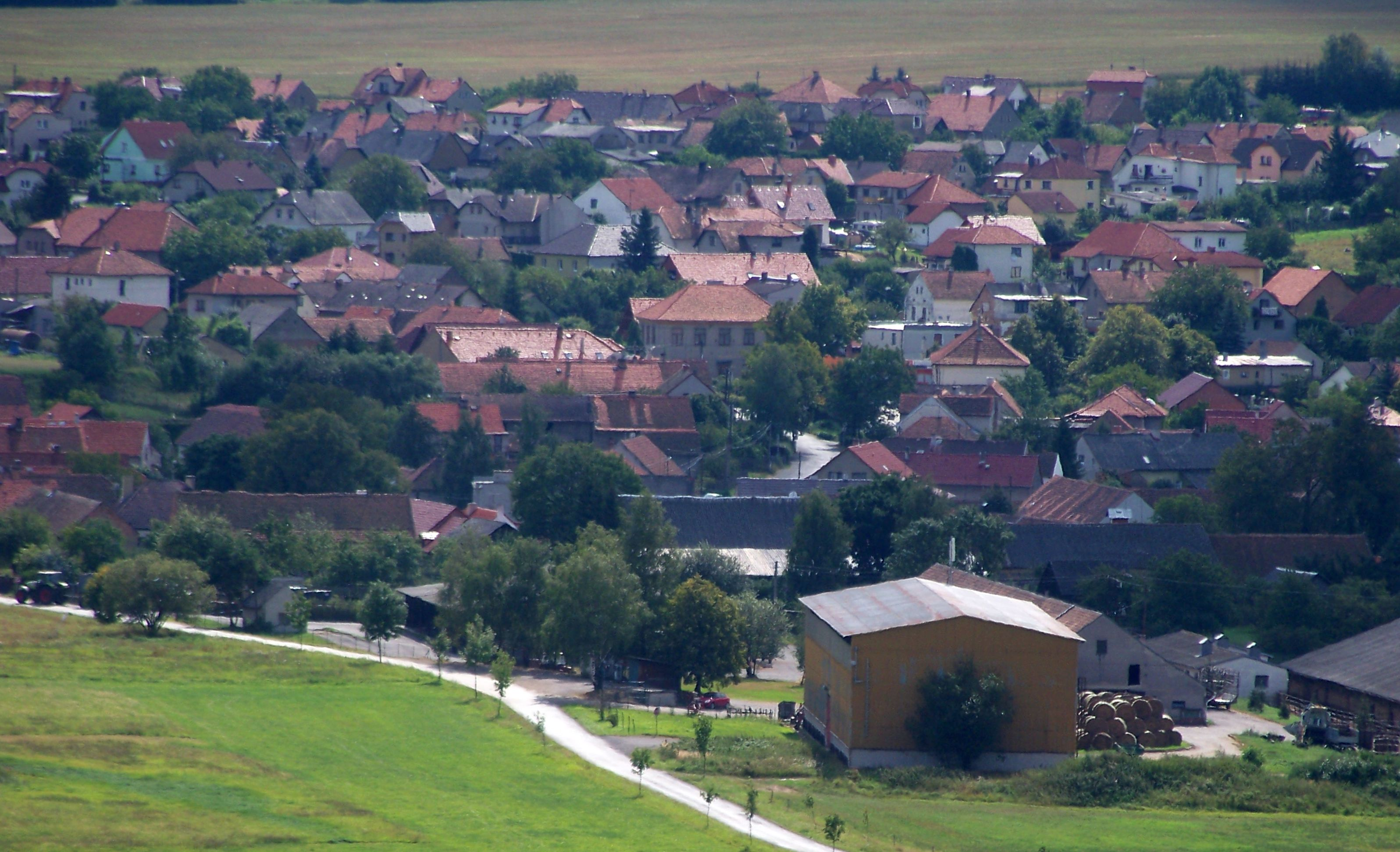
- General view of Broumy

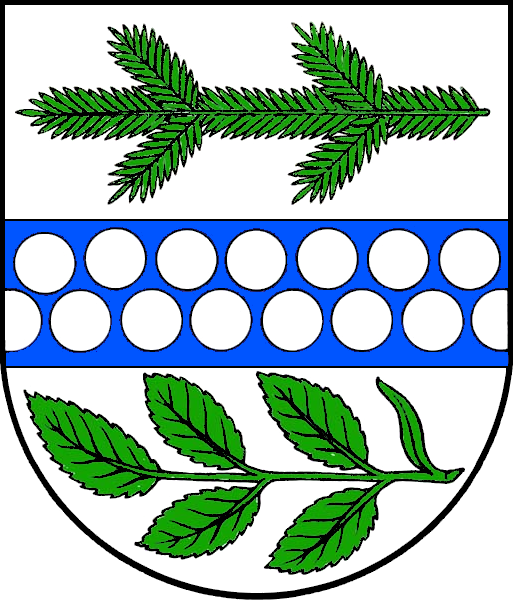
- Flag Coat of arms

- Location in the Czech Republic
- Coordinates: 49°57′19″N 13°51′8″E
- Country: Czech Republic
- Region: Central Bohemian
- District: Beroun
- First mentioned: 1358

Area
  - Total: 28.58 km^{2} (11.03 sq mi)
- Elevation: 395 m (1,296 ft)

Population (2026-01-01)
  - Total: 990
  - Density: 35/km^{2} (90/sq mi)
- Time zone: UTC+1 (CET)
  - Summer (DST): UTC+2 (CEST)
- Postal code: 267 42
- Website: www.broumy.cz

Broumy is a municipality and village in Beroun District in the Central Bohemian Region of the Czech Republic. It has about 1,000 inhabitants.

== Demographics ==
Historical population
Year	Pop.	±%
1869	921	—
1880	841	−8.7%
1890	871	+3.6%
1900	930	+6.8%
1910	946	+1.7%
1921	946	+0.0%
1930	959	+1.4%
1950	819	−14.6%
1961	878	+7.2%
1970	838	−4.6%
1980	816	−2.6%
1991	780	−4.4%
2001	798	+2.3%
2011	860	+7.8%
2021	977	+13.6%
Source: Censuses
