= Vižina =

- Municipality
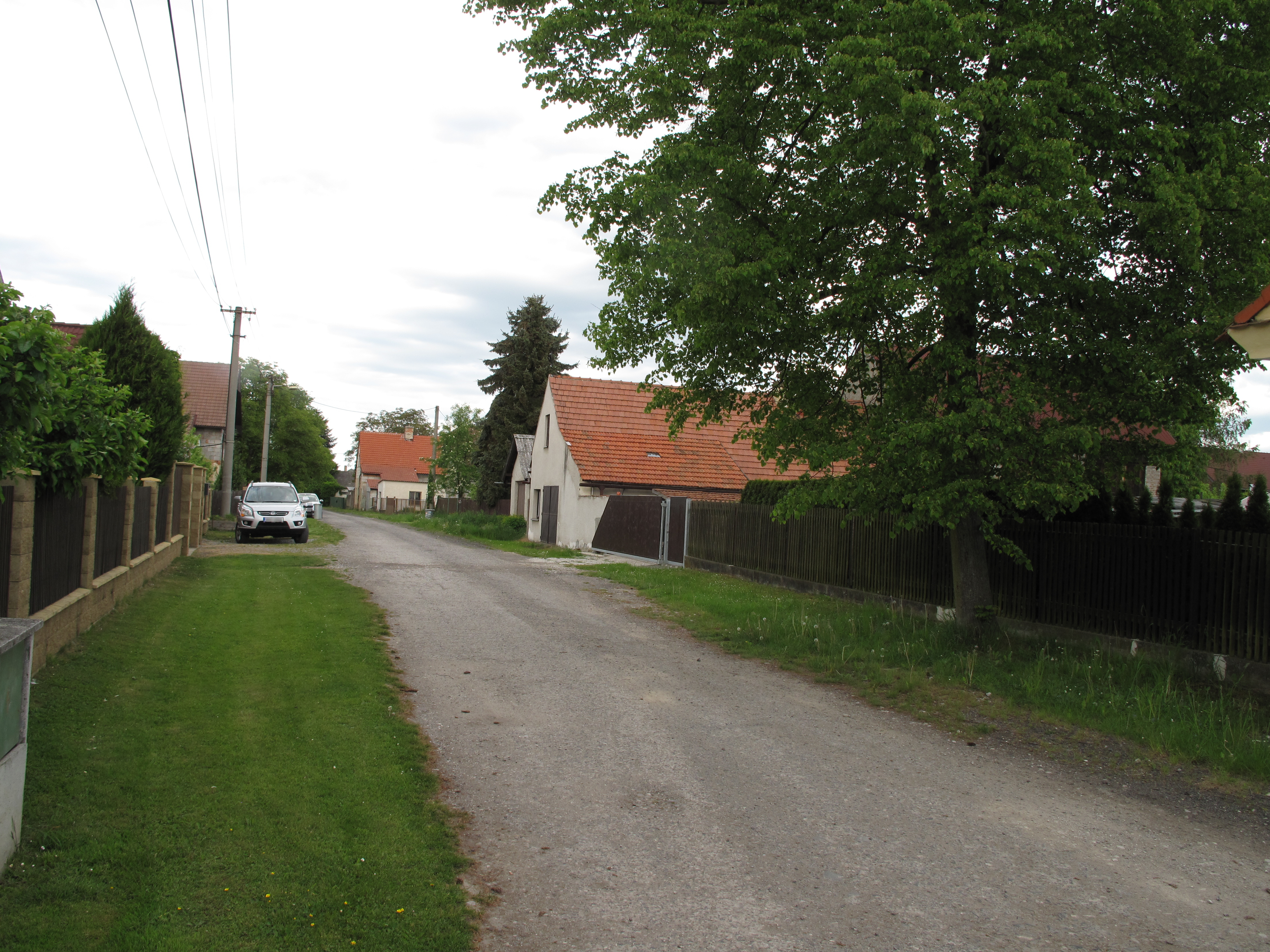
- A street in Vižina

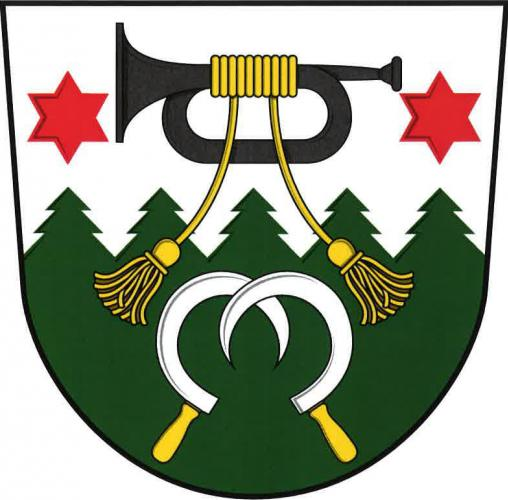
- Coat of arms

- Location in the Czech Republic
- Coordinates: 49°51′26″N 14°6′17″E
- Country: Czech Republic
- Region: Central Bohemian
- District: Beroun
- First mentioned: 1405

Area
  - Total: 3.88 km^{2} (1.50 sq mi)
- Elevation: 350 m (1,150 ft)

Population (2026-01-01)
  - Total: 276
  - Density: 71.1/km^{2} (184/sq mi)
- Time zone: UTC+1 (CET)
  - Summer (DST): UTC+2 (CEST)
- Postal code: 267 24
- Website: obecvizina.cz

Vižina is a municipality and village in Beroun District in the Central Bohemian Region of the Czech Republic. It has about 300 inhabitants.

== Demographics ==
Historical population
Year	Pop.	±%
1869	360	—
1880	327	−9.2%
1890	344	+5.2%
1900	344	+0.0%
1910	308	−10.5%
1921	271	−12.0%
1930	294	+8.5%
1950	251	−14.6%
1961	249	−0.8%
1970	221	−11.2%
1980	210	−5.0%
1991	196	−6.7%
2001	203	+3.6%
2011	225	+10.8%
2021	276	+22.7%
Source: Censuses
