= Velký Chlumec =

- Municipality
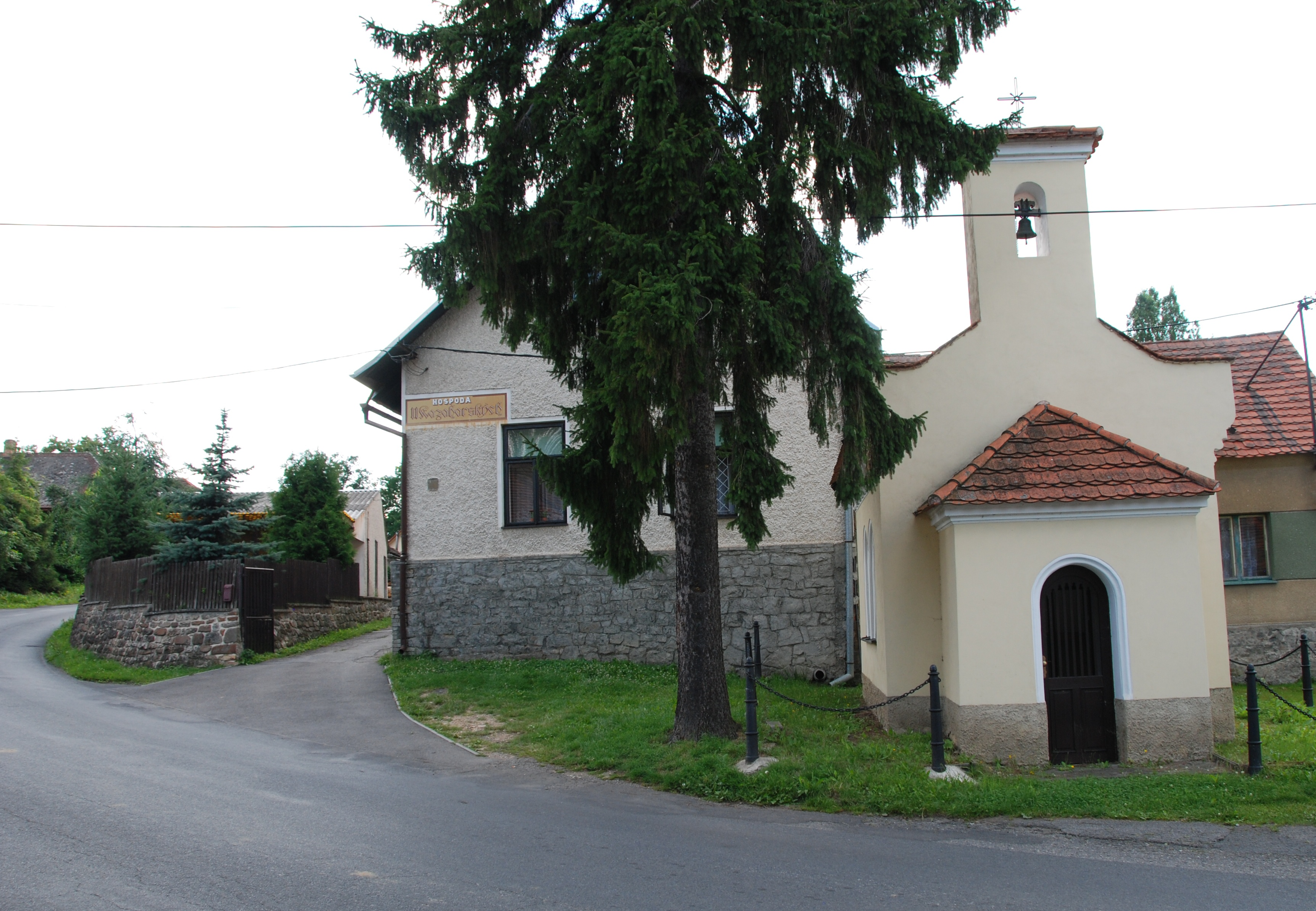
- Chapel of Saint Ludmila

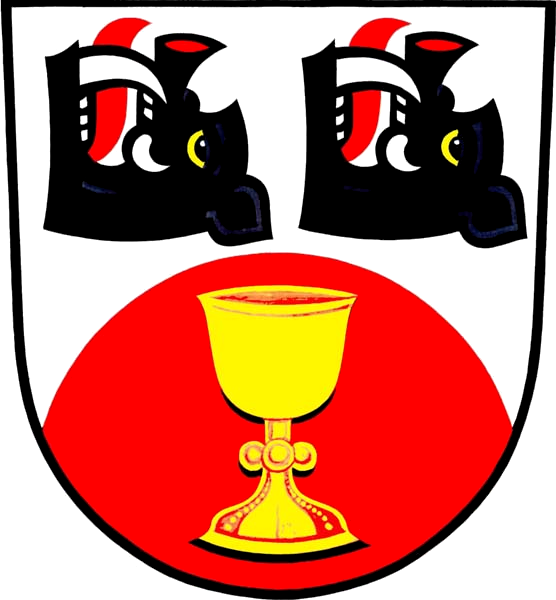
- Flag Coat of arms

- Location in the Czech Republic
- Coordinates: 49°49′40″N 14°5′13″E
- Country: Czech Republic
- Region: Central Bohemian
- District: Beroun
- First mentioned: 1379

Area
  - Total: 4.53 km^{2} (1.75 sq mi)
- Elevation: 420 m (1,380 ft)

Population (2026-01-01)
  - Total: 450
  - Density: 99/km^{2} (260/sq mi)
- Time zone: UTC+1 (CET)
  - Summer (DST): UTC+2 (CEST)
- Postal code: 267 24
- Website: www.obecvelkychlumec.cz

Velký Chlumec is a municipality and village in Beroun District in the Central Bohemian Region of the Czech Republic. It has about 500 inhabitants.

== Administrative division ==
Velký Chlumec consists of two municipal parts (in brackets population according to the 2021 census):

- Velký Chlumec (221)
- Malý Chlumec (208)

== Demographics ==
Historical population
| Year | Pop. | ±% |
|---|---|---|
| 1869 | 677 | — |
| 1880 | 746 | +10.2% |
| 1890 | 630 | −15.5% |
| 1900 | 713 | +13.2% |
| 1910 | 643 | −9.8% |
| 1921 | 578 | −10.1% |
| 1930 | 558 | −3.5% |
| 1950 | 496 | −11.1% |
| 1961 | 505 | +1.8% |
| 1970 | 448 | −11.3% |
| 1980 | 404 | −9.8% |
| 1991 | 351 | −13.1% |
| 2001 | 345 | −1.7% |
| 2011 | 369 | +7.0% |
| 2021 | 429 | +16.3% |
Source: Censuses
