= Rpety =

- Municipality
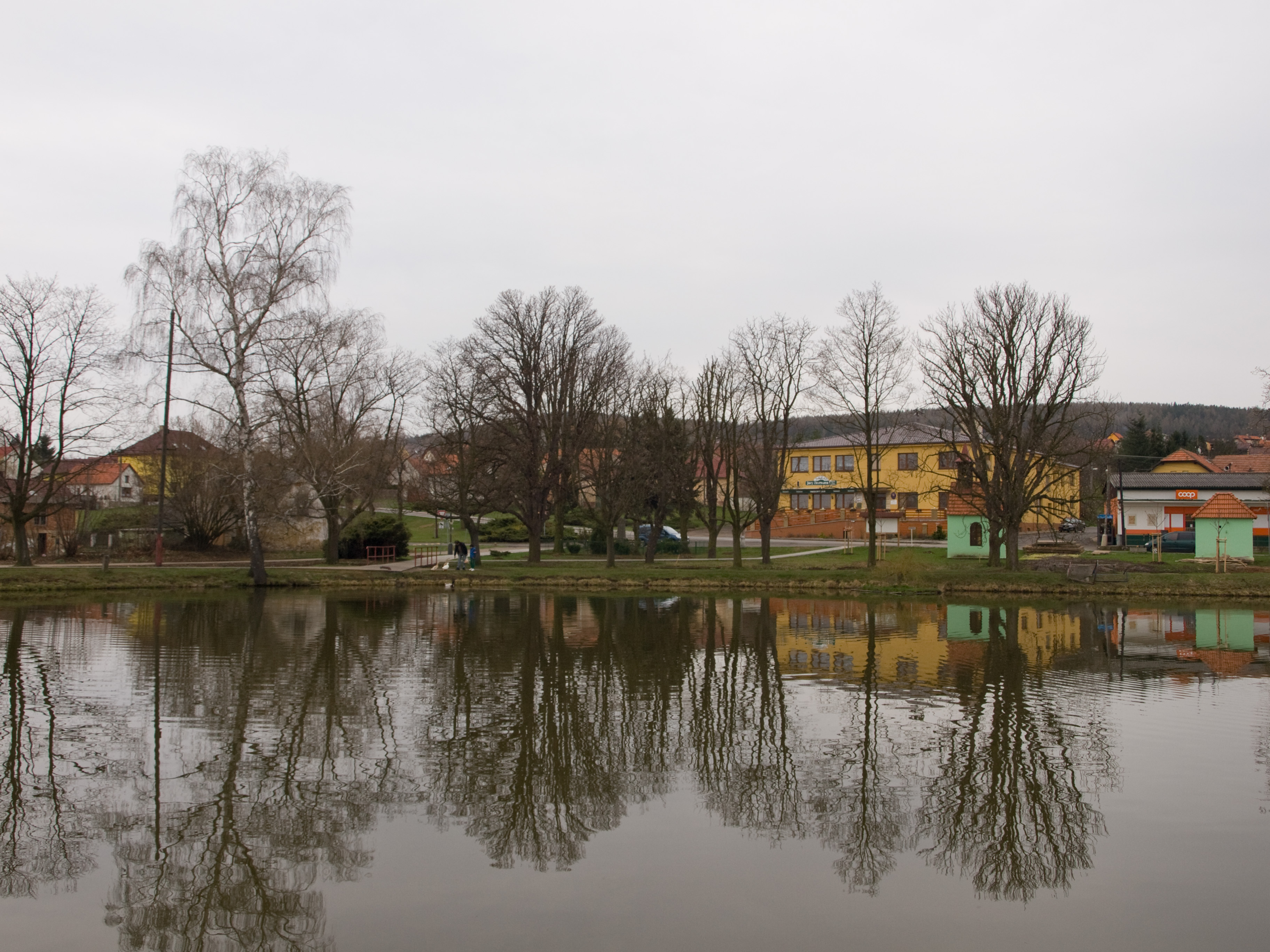
- A pond in the centre of Rpety

- Location in the Czech Republic
- Coordinates: 49°49′42″N 13°56′19″E
- Country: Czech Republic
- Region: Central Bohemian
- District: Beroun
- First mentioned: 1115

Area
  - Total: 5.93 km^{2} (2.29 sq mi)
- Elevation: 360 m (1,180 ft)

Population (2026-01-01)
  - Total: 493
  - Density: 83.1/km^{2} (215/sq mi)
- Time zone: UTC+1 (CET)
  - Summer (DST): UTC+2 (CEST)
- Postal code: 268 01
- Website: www.rpety.cz

Rpety is a municipality and village in Beroun District in the Central Bohemian Region of the Czech Republic. It has about 500 inhabitants.

== Demographics ==
Historical population
Year	Pop.	±%
1869	393	—
1880	453	+15.3%
1890	444	−2.0%
1900	467	+5.2%
1910	492	+5.4%
1921	480	−2.4%
1930	466	−2.9%
1950	422	−9.4%
1961	391	−7.3%
1970	346	−11.5%
1980	358	+3.5%
1991	404	+12.8%
2001	426	+5.4%
2011	465	+9.2%
2021	482	+3.7%
Source: Censuses
