= Felbabka =

- Municipality
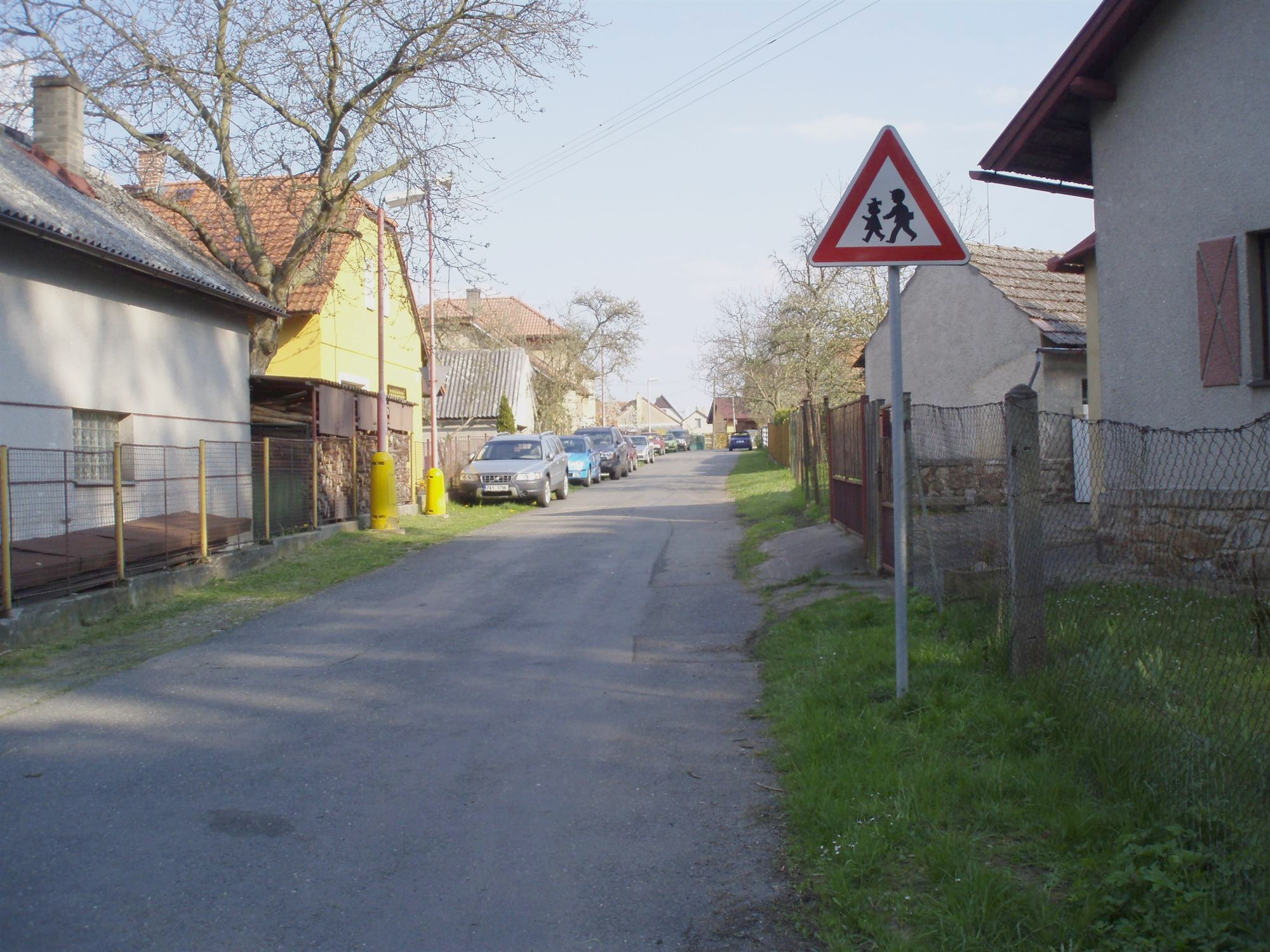
- Street in Felbabka

- Location in the Czech Republic
- Coordinates: 49°48′48″N 13°56′31″E
- Country: Czech Republic
- Region: Central Bohemian
- District: Beroun
- First mentioned: 1657

Area
  - Total: 1.70 km^{2} (0.66 sq mi)
- Elevation: 440 m (1,440 ft)

Population (2026-01-01)
  - Total: 312
  - Density: 184/km^{2} (475/sq mi)
- Time zone: UTC+1 (CET)
  - Summer (DST): UTC+2 (CEST)
- Postal code: 268 01
- Website: www.felbabka.eu

Felbabka is a municipality and village in Beroun District in the Central Bohemian Region of the Czech Republic. It has about 300 inhabitants.

== Demographics ==
Historical population
Year	Pop.	±%
1869	264	—
1880	259	−1.9%
1890	228	−12.0%
1900	279	+22.4%
1910	305	+9.3%
1921	335	+9.8%
1930	310	−7.5%
1950	253	−18.4%
1961	266	+5.1%
1970	267	+0.4%
1980	264	−1.1%
1991	216	−18.2%
2001	223	+3.2%
2011	255	+14.3%
2021	274	+7.5%
Source: Censuses
