= Svatá =

- Municipality
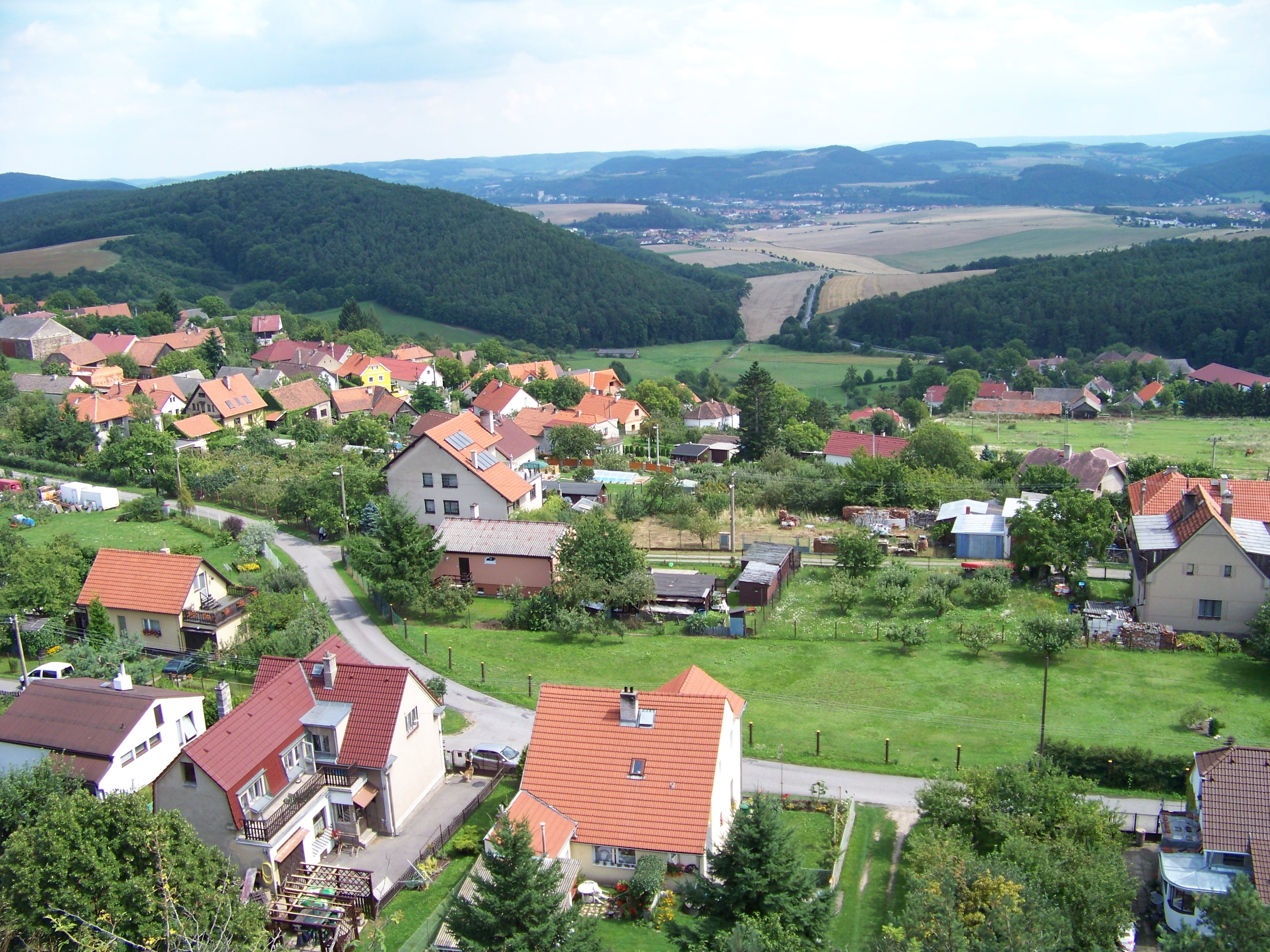
- View of Svatá

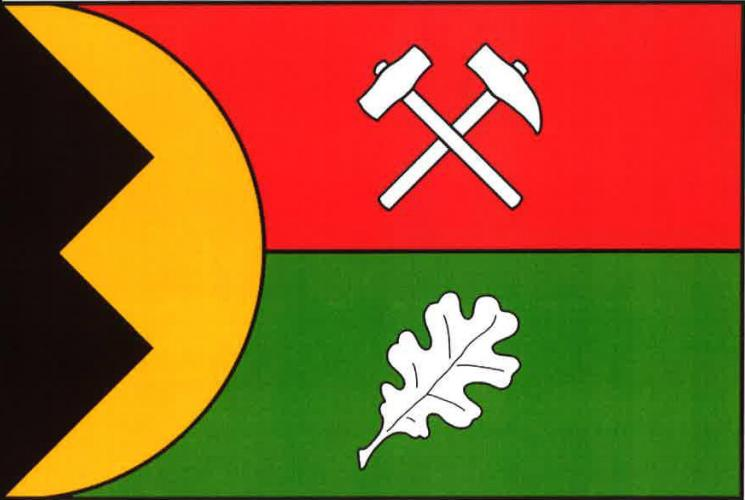
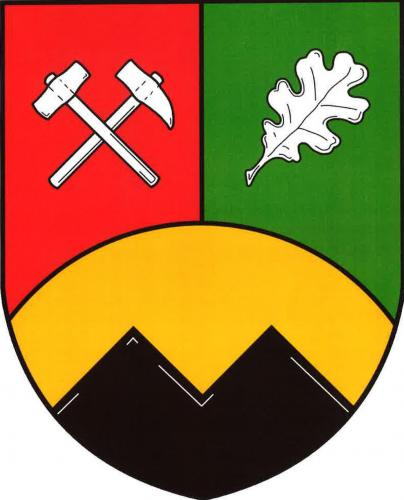
- Flag Coat of arms

- Location in the Czech Republic
- Coordinates: 49°56′21″N 13°57′42″E
- Country: Czech Republic
- Region: Central Bohemian
- District: Beroun
- First mentioned: 1553

Area
  - Total: 5.50 km^{2} (2.12 sq mi)
- Elevation: 460 m (1,510 ft)

Population (2026-01-01)
  - Total: 539
  - Density: 98.0/km^{2} (254/sq mi)
- Time zone: UTC+1 (CET)
  - Summer (DST): UTC+2 (CEST)
- Postal code: 267 51
- Website: www.svata.cz

Svatá is a municipality and village in Beroun District in the Central Bohemian Region of the Czech Republic. It has about 500 inhabitants.

== Demographics ==
Historical population
Year	Pop.	±%
1869	771	—
1880	823	+6.7%
1890	864	+5.0%
1900	890	+3.0%
1910	864	−2.9%
1921	806	−6.7%
1930	669	−17.0%
1950	543	−18.8%
1961	551	+1.5%
1970	473	−14.2%
1980	434	−8.2%
1991	368	−15.2%
2001	377	+2.4%
2011	425	+12.7%
2021	530	+24.7%
Source: Censuses
