= Trubská =

- Municipality
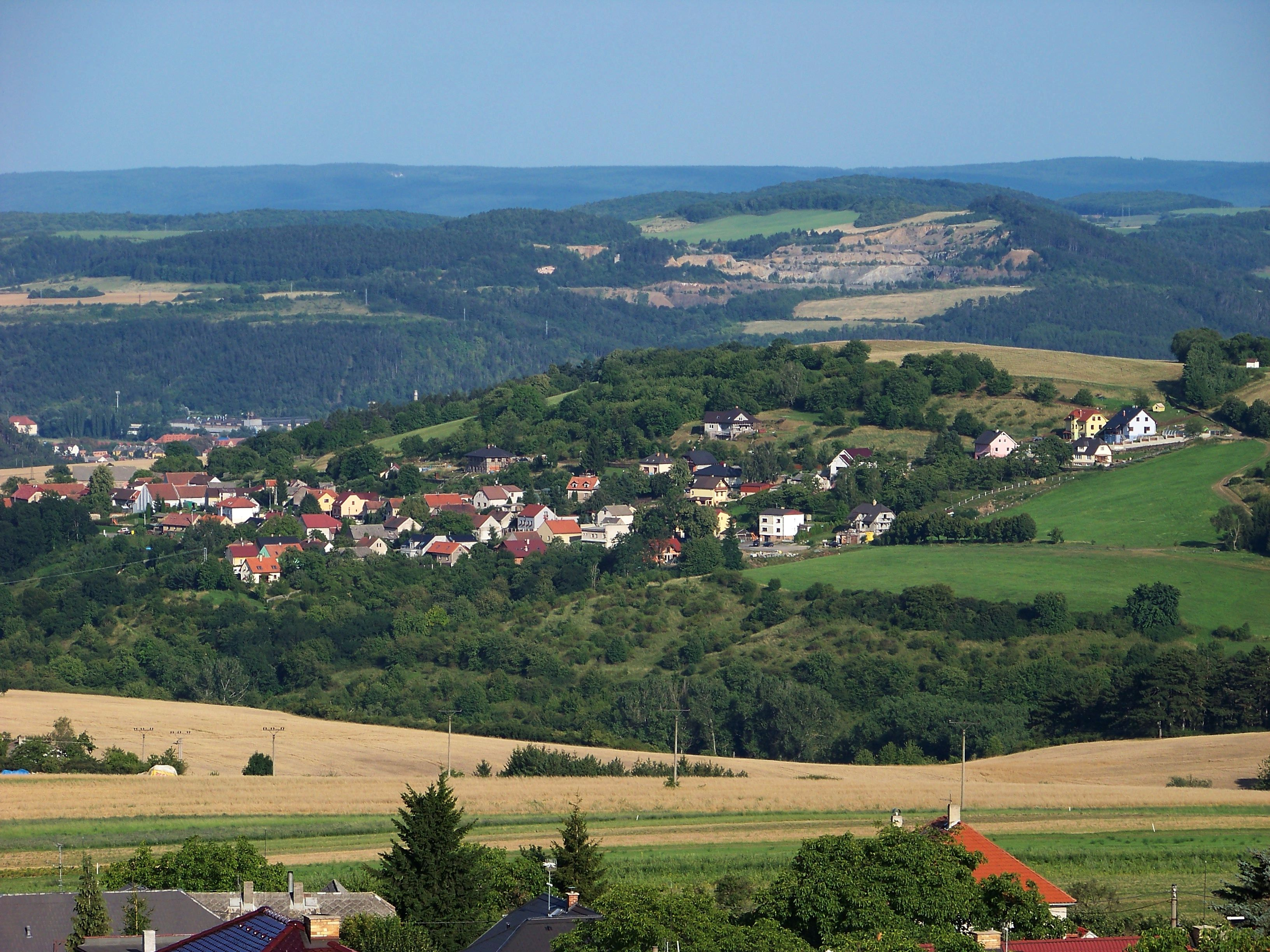
- General view

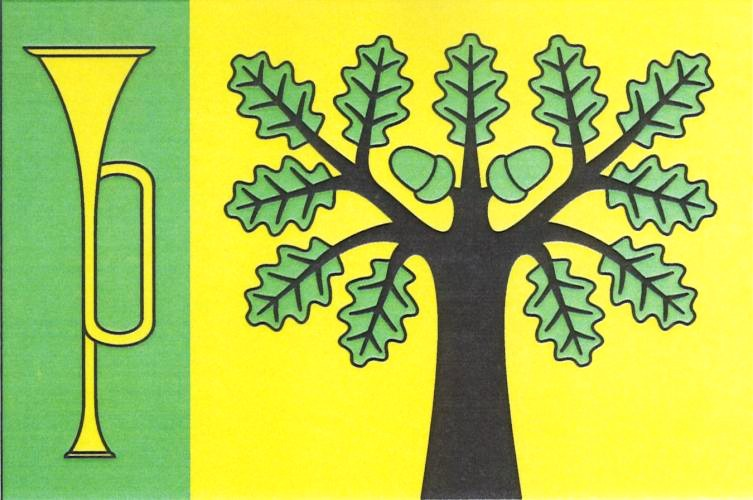
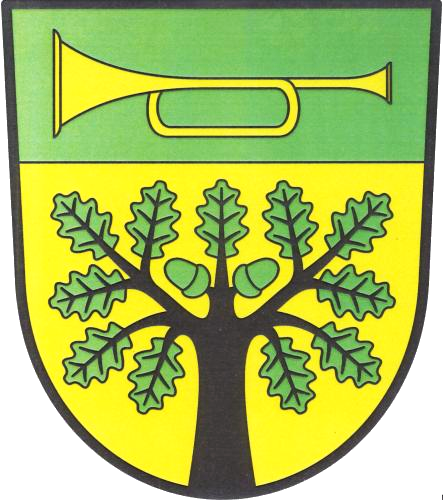
- Flag Coat of arms

- Location in the Czech Republic
- Coordinates: 49°57′18″N 13°59′37″E
- Country: Czech Republic
- Region: Central Bohemian
- District: Beroun
- First mentioned: 1237

Area
  - Total: 1.85 km^{2} (0.71 sq mi)
- Elevation: 320 m (1,050 ft)

Population (2026-01-01)
  - Total: 194
  - Density: 105/km^{2} (272/sq mi)
- Time zone: UTC+1 (CET)
  - Summer (DST): UTC+2 (CEST)
- Postal code: 266 01
- Website: www.trubska.cz

Trubská is a municipality and village in Beroun District in the Central Bohemian Region of the Czech Republic. It has about 200 inhabitants.

== Demographics ==
Historical population
Year	Pop.	±%
1869	183	—
1880	206	+12.6%
1890	205	−0.5%
1900	242	+18.0%
1910	248	+2.5%
1921	250	+0.8%
1930	280	+12.0%
1950	199	−28.9%
1961	199	+0.0%
1970	174	−12.6%
1980	142	−18.4%
1991	104	−26.8%
2001	121	+16.3%
2011	168	+38.8%
2021	195	+16.1%
Source: Censuses
