= Osek (Beroun District) =

- Municipality
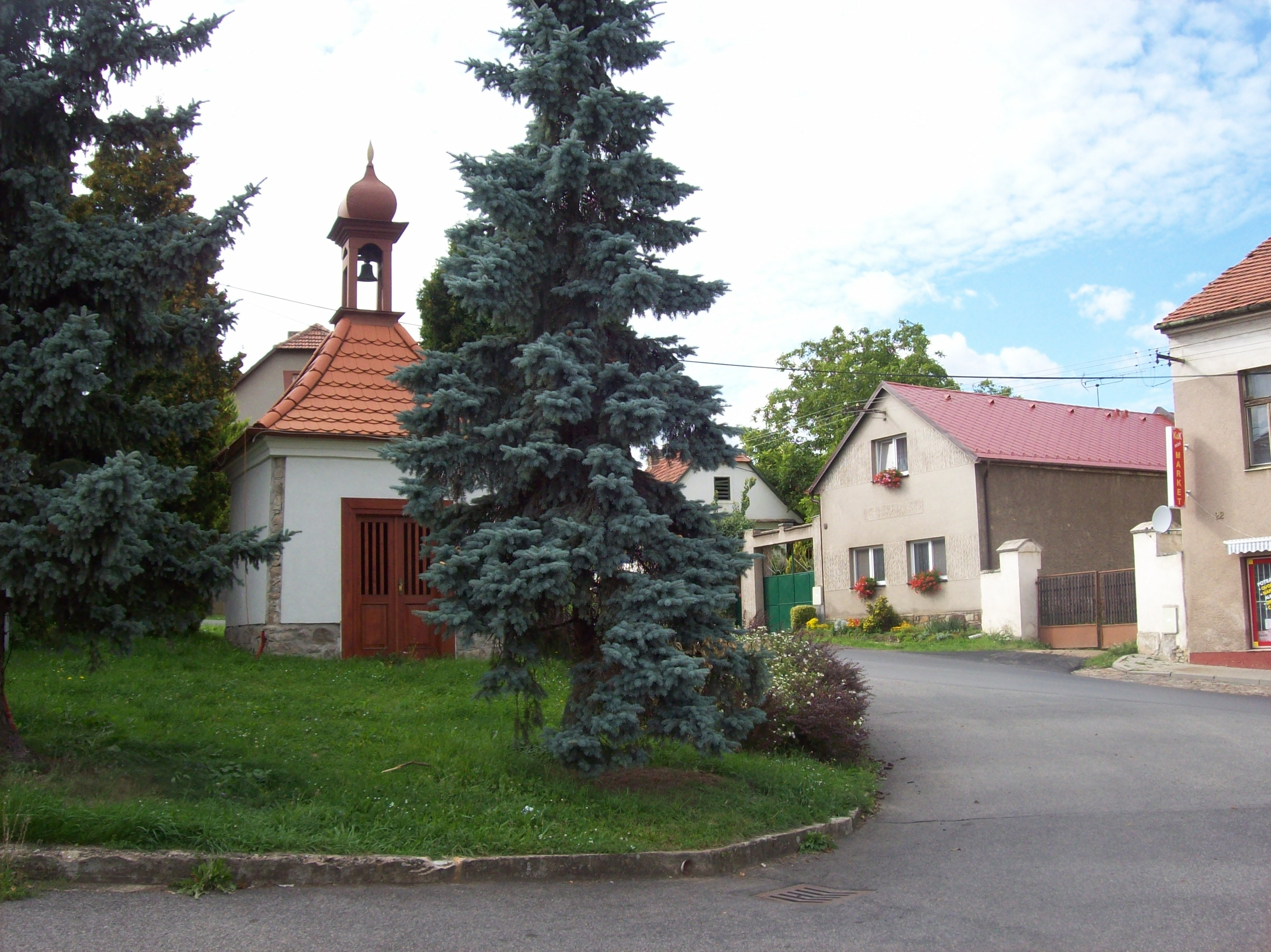
- Centre of Osek

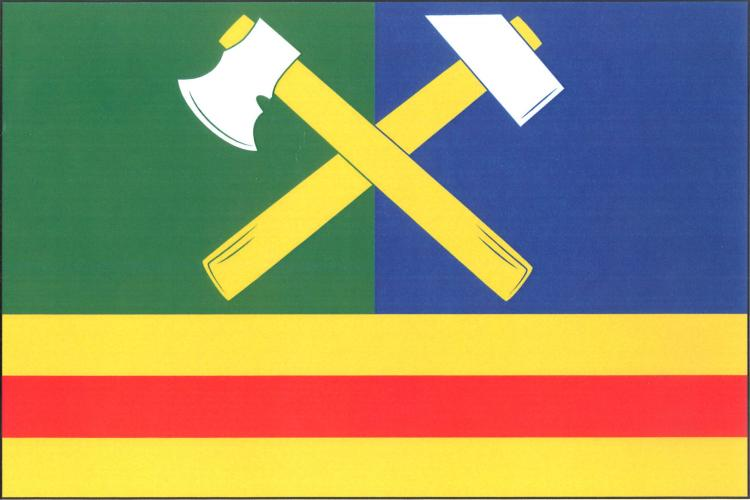
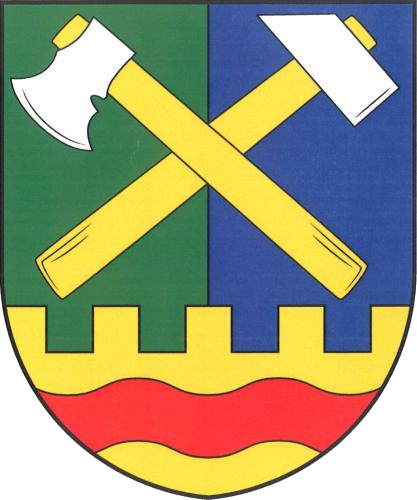
- Flag Coat of arms

- Location in the Czech Republic
- Coordinates: 49°49′11″N 13°51′31″E
- Country: Czech Republic
- Region: Central Bohemian
- District: Beroun
- First mentioned: 1543

Area
  - Total: 4.97 km^{2} (1.92 sq mi)
- Elevation: 400 m (1,300 ft)

Population (2026-01-01)
  - Total: 879
  - Density: 177/km^{2} (458/sq mi)
- Time zone: UTC+1 (CET)
  - Summer (DST): UTC+2 (CEST)
- Postal code: 267 62
- Website: www.obecosek.eud.cz

Osek is a municipality and village in Beroun District in the Central Bohemian Region of the Czech Republic. It has about 900 inhabitants.

== Demographics ==
Historical population
Year	Pop.	±%
1869	647	—
1880	667	+3.1%
1890	732	+9.7%
1900	794	+8.5%
1910	884	+11.3%
1921	1,018	+15.2%
1930	1,024	+0.6%
1950	979	−4.4%
1961	834	−14.8%
1970	793	−4.9%
1980	829	+4.5%
1991	747	−9.9%
2001	760	+1.7%
2011	761	+0.1%
2021	818	+7.5%
Source: Censuses
