= Stašov (Beroun District) =

- Municipality
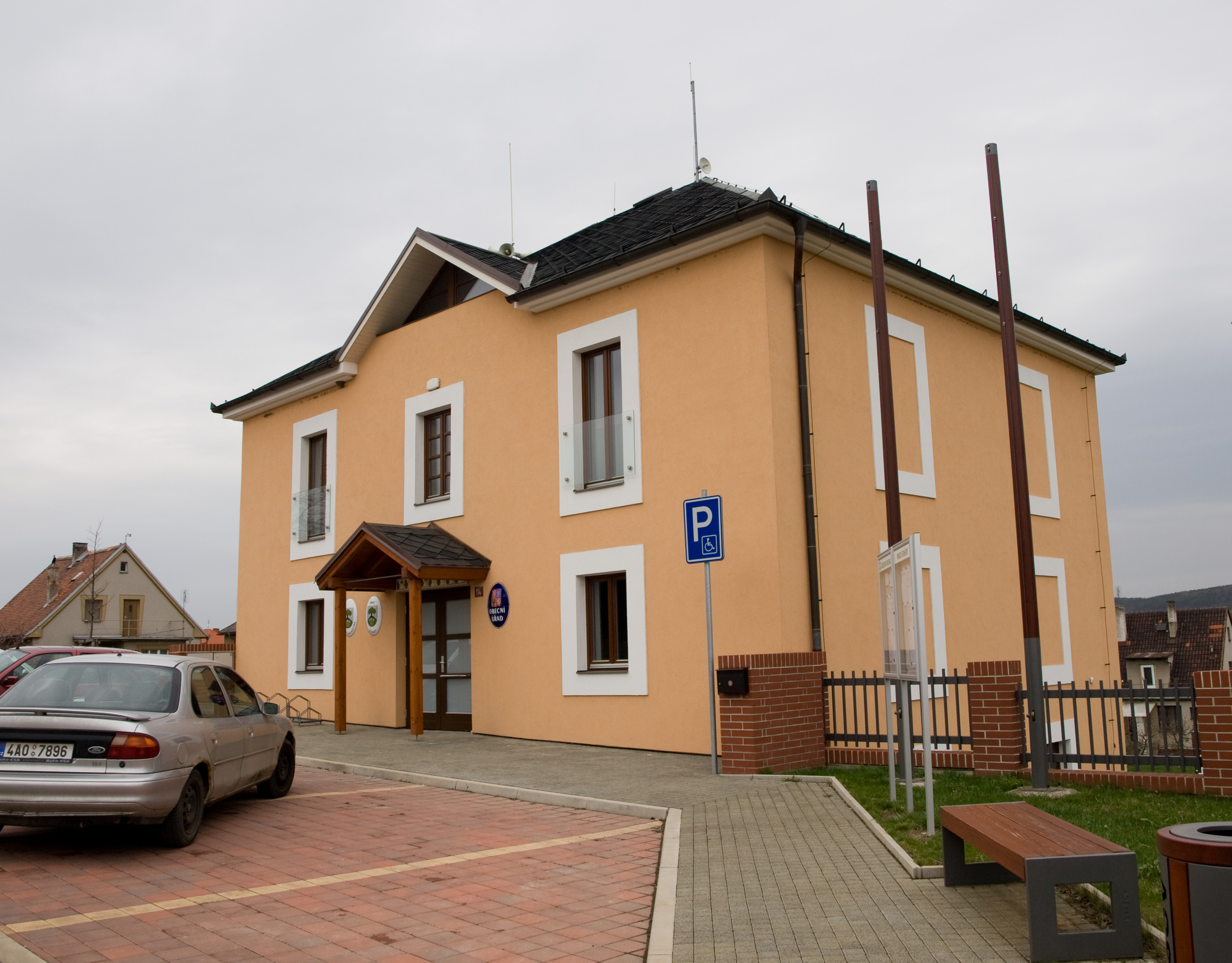
- Municipal office

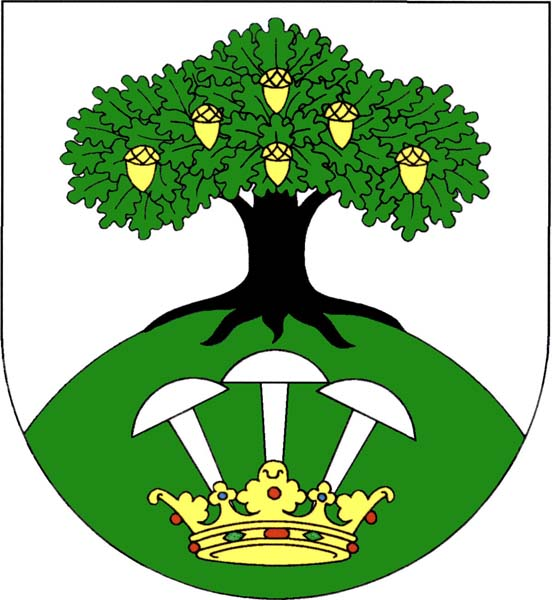
- Flag Coat of arms

- Location in the Czech Republic
- Coordinates: 49°53′0″N 13°57′27″E
- Country: Czech Republic
- Region: Central Bohemian
- District: Beroun
- First mentioned: 1085

Area
  - Total: 2.33 km^{2} (0.90 sq mi)
- Elevation: 293 m (961 ft)

Population (2026-01-01)
  - Total: 494
  - Density: 212/km^{2} (549/sq mi)
- Time zone: UTC+1 (CET)
  - Summer (DST): UTC+2 (CEST)
- Postal code: 267 51
- Website: www.obecstasov.cz

Stašov is a municipality and village in Beroun District in the Central Bohemian Region of the Czech Republic. It has about 500 inhabitants.

== Demographics ==
Historical population
Year	Pop.	±%
1869	553	—
1880	539	−2.5%
1890	534	−0.9%
1900	572	+7.1%
1910	539	−5.8%
1921	544	+0.9%
1930	484	−11.0%
1950	360	−25.6%
1961	412	+14.4%
1970	378	−8.3%
1980	370	−2.1%
1991	309	−16.5%
2001	346	+12.0%
2011	412	+19.1%
2021	455	+10.4%
Source: Censuses

== Transport ==
Stašov is located on the railway line Plzeň–Beroun.
