= Beroun District =

Beroun District Okres Beroun
- District
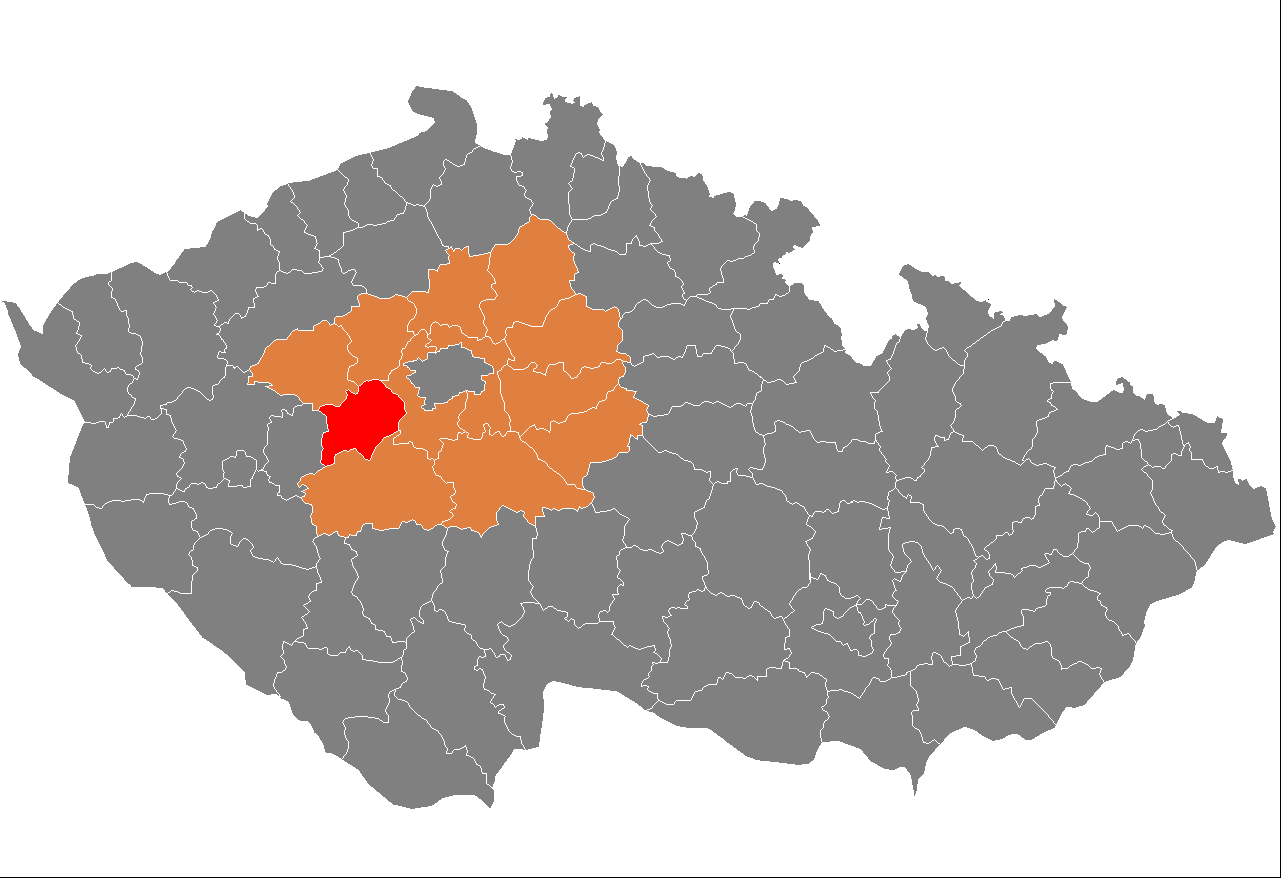
- Location in the Central Bohemian Region within the Czech Republic

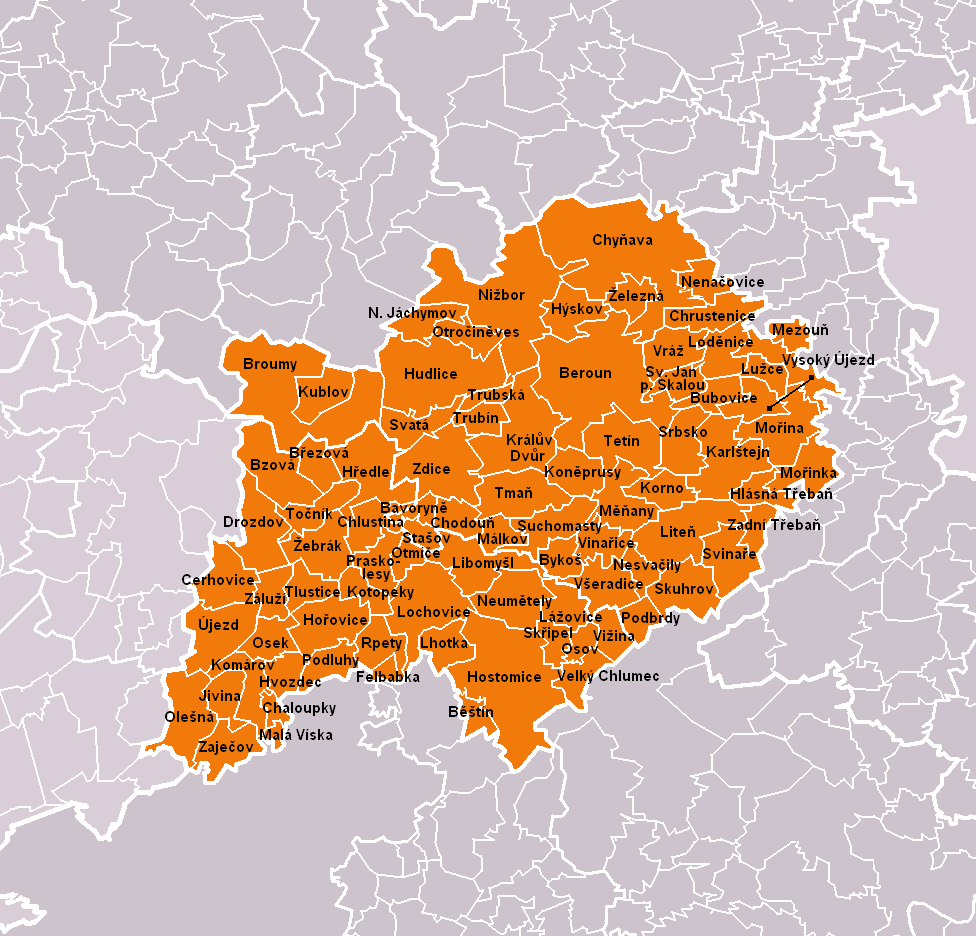
- Coordinates: 49°56′N 14°1′E
- Country: Czech Republic
- Region: Central Bohemian
- Capital: Beroun

Area
  - Total: 703.64 km^{2} (271.68 sq mi)

Population (2026)
  - Total: 103,455
  - Density: 147.03/km^{2} (380.80/sq mi)
- Time zone: UTC+1 (CET)
  - Summer (DST): UTC+2 (CEST)
- Municipalities: 85
- * Towns: 6
- * Market towns: 4

Beroun District (Czech: okres Beroun) is a district in the Central Bohemian Region of the Czech Republic. Its capital is the town of Beroun.

== Administrative division ==
Beroun District is divided into two administrative districts of municipalities with extended competence: Beroun and Hořovice.

=== List of municipalities ===
Towns are marked in bold and market towns in italics:

Bavoryně - Beroun - Běštín - Březová - Broumy - Bubovice - Bykoš - Bzová - Cerhovice - Chaloupky - Chlustina - Chodouň - Chrustenice - Chyňava - Drozdov - Felbabka - Hlásná Třebaň - Hořovice - Hostomice - Hředle - Hudlice - Hvozdec - Hýskov - Jivina - Karlštejn - Komárov - Koněprusy - Korno - Kotopeky - Králův Dvůr - Kublov - Lážovice - Lhotka - Libomyšl - Liteň - Loděnice - Lochovice - Lužce - Malá Víska - Málkov - Měňany - Mezouň - Mořina - Mořinka - Nenačovice - Nesvačily - Neumětely - Nižbor - Nový Jáchymov - Olešná - Osek - Osov - Otmíče - Otročiněves - Podbrdy - Podluhy - Praskolesy - Rpety - Skřipel - Skuhrov - Srbsko - Stašov - Suchomasty - Svatá - Svatý Jan pod Skalou - Svinaře - Tetín - Tlustice - Tmaň - Točník - Trubín - Trubská - Újezd - Velký Chlumec - Vinařice - Vižina - Vráž - Všeradice - Vysoký Újezd - Zadní Třebaň - Zaječov - Záluží - Zdice - Žebrák - Železná

== Geography ==
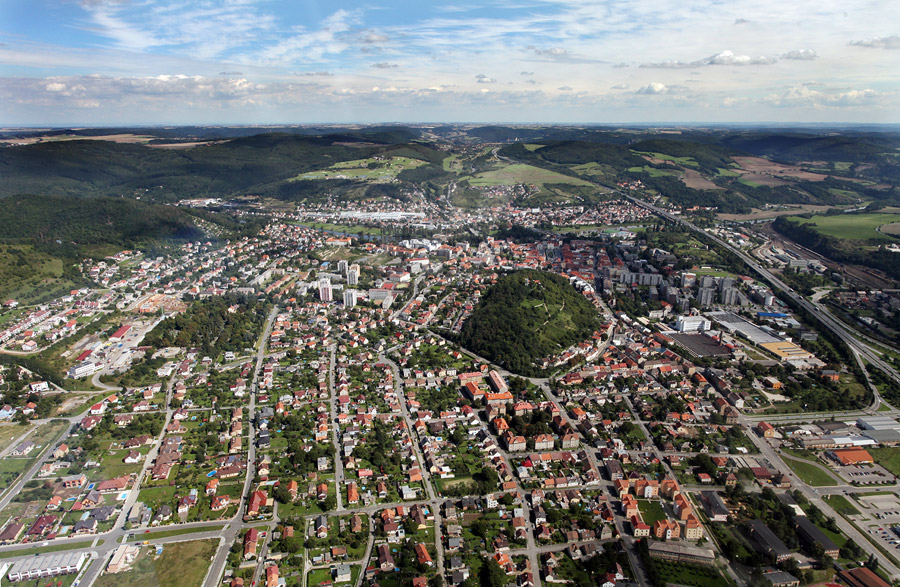
Beroun and surrounding landscape

A hilly landscape is typical for the district. The territory extends into three geomorphological mesoregions: Křivoklát Highlands (north), Hořovice Uplands (central part) and Brdy Highlands (south). The highest point of the district is the hill Jordán in Zaječov with an elevation of 826 m (2,710 ft), the lowest point is the river basin of the Berounka in Zadní Třebaň at 211 m (692 ft).

From the total district area of 703.6 km^{2} (271.7 sq mi), agricultural land occupies 343.8 km^{2} (132.7 sq mi), forests occupy 272.8 km^{2} (105.3 sq mi), and water area occupies 9.1 km^{2} (3.5 sq mi). Forests cover 38.8% of the district's area.

The most important river is the Berounka, which drains the entire territory. Its longest tributary is the Litavka. The area is very poor in bodies of water.

In the district are three protected landscape areas: Bohemian Karst, Brdy and Křivoklátsko.

== Demographics ==
Historical population

Year	Pop.	±%
1869	67,373	—
1880	69,439	+3.1%
1890	71,354	+2.8%
1900	79,741	+11.8%
1910	85,356	+7.0%

Year	Pop.	±%
1921	84,021	−1.6%
1930	87,937	+4.7%
1950	79,572	−9.5%
1961	81,550	+2.5%
1970	80,025	−1.9%

Year	Pop.	±%
1980	79,077	−1.2%
1991	75,859	−4.1%
2001	75,687	−0.2%
2011	86,162	+13.8%
2021	98,073	+13.8%

Source: Censuses

=== Most populous municipalities ===
Name	Population	Area (km^{2})
Beroun	21,744	31
Králův Dvůr	10,677	15
Hořovice	8,245	10
Zdice	4,125	14
Komárov	2,439	6
Hýskov	2,253	6
Žebrák	2,243	9
Vysoký Újezd	2,143	12
Nižbor	2,109	28
Loděnice	2,019	6

== Economy ==
The largest employers with headquarters in Beroun District and at least 500 employees are:

Economic entity	Location	Number of employees	Main activity
GZ Media	Loděnice	1,500–1,999	Manufacture of vinyls
Tipsport.net	Beroun	1,000–1,499	Betting agency
A-ROYAL Service	Beroun	500–999	Private security activities
Saint-Gobain Sekurit ČR	Hořovice	500–999	Manufacture of flat glass
Arriva Střední Čechy	Králův Dvůr	500–999	Passenger transport
Mubea	Žebrák	500–999	Manufacture of machinery and equipment
Mubea Transmission Components	Žebrák	500–999	Manufacture of rubber and plastic products
Smurfit Westrock Czech	Žebrák	500–999	Manufacture of paper packaging
Valeo Výměníky Tepla	Žebrák	500–999	Manufacture of heating systems

== Transport ==
The D5 motorway from Prague to Plzeň and the border with Germany passes through the district.

== Sights ==
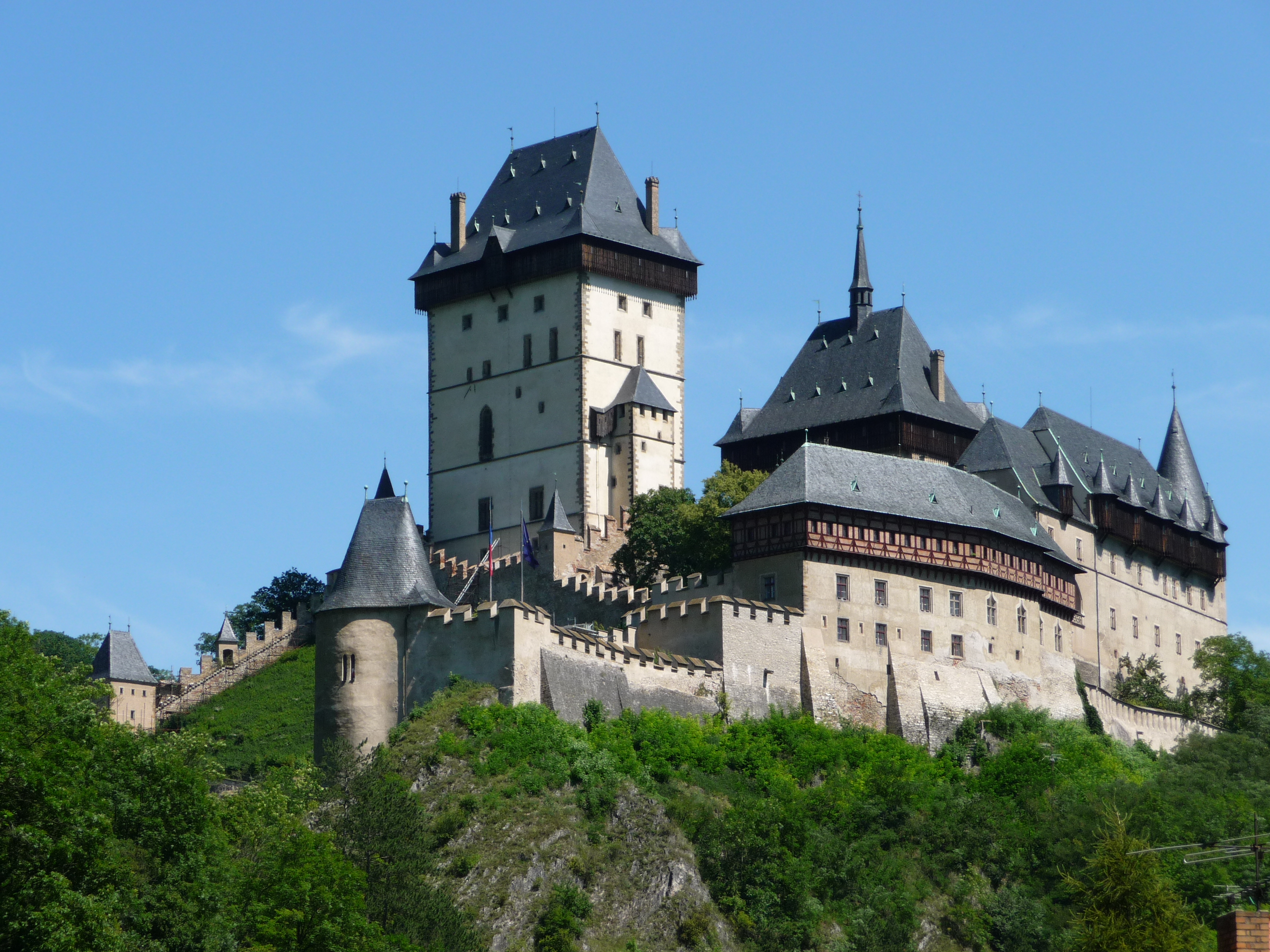
Karlštejn Castle

The most important monuments in the district, protected as national cultural monuments, are:

- Karlštejn Castle
- Ruins of the castles Žebrák and Točník
- Hořovice Castle
- Benedictine monastery in Svatý Jan pod Skalou

The best-preserved settlements and landscapes, protected as monument zones, are:

- Beroun
- Kleštěnice
- Korno
- Mořinka
- Olešná
- Osovsko landscape

The most visited tourist destination is the Karlštejn Castle.
