= Mořinka =

- Municipality
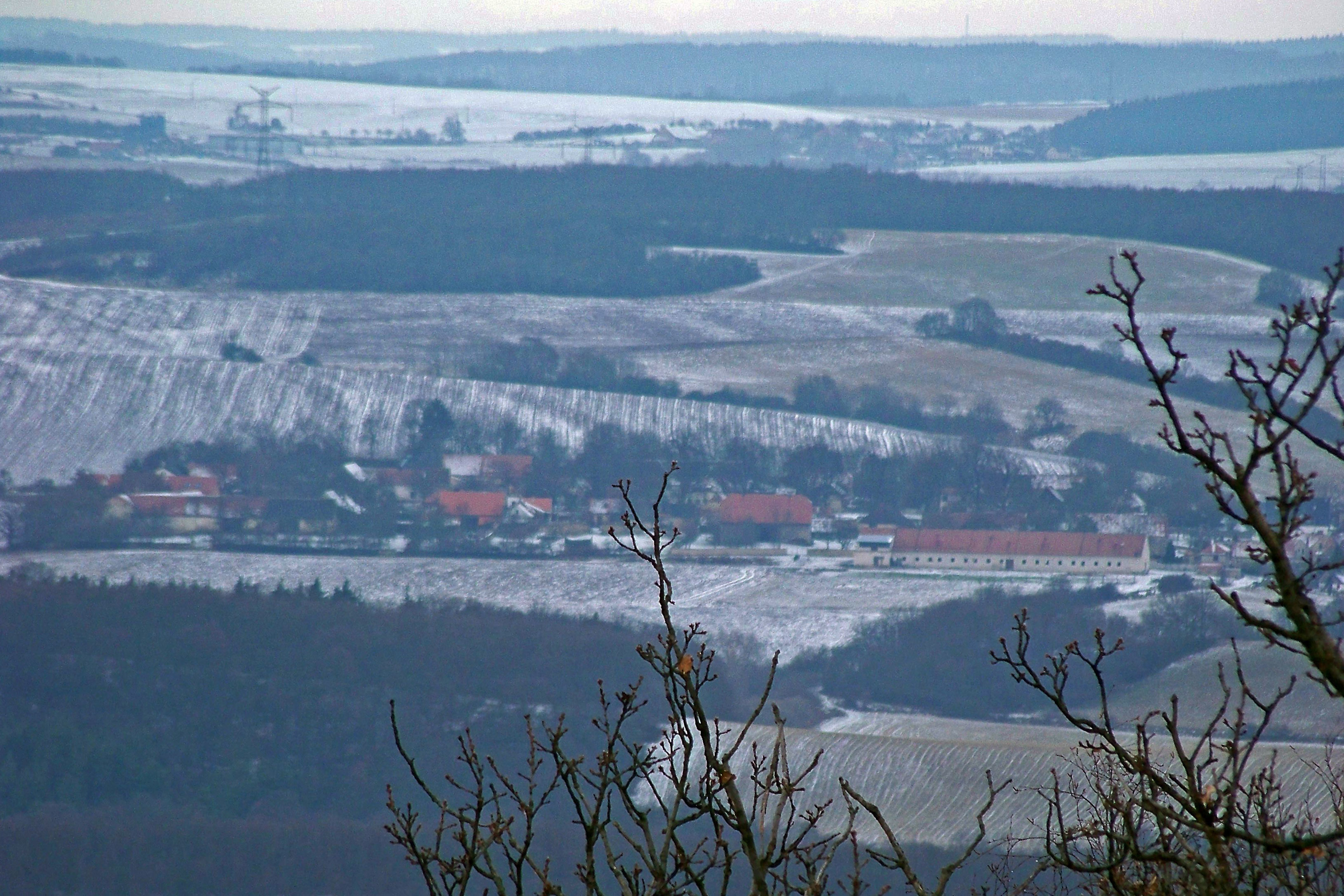
- View from the south

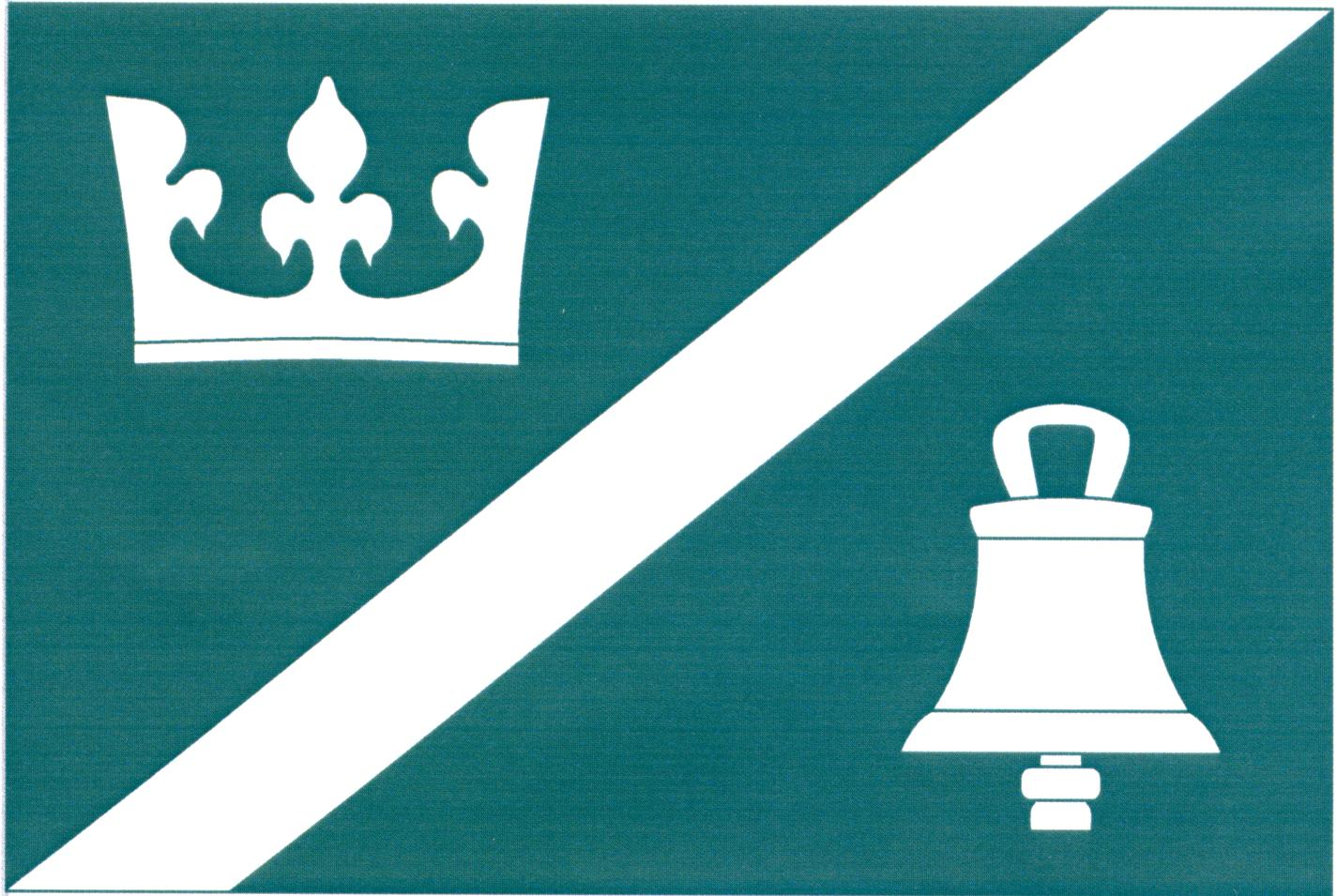
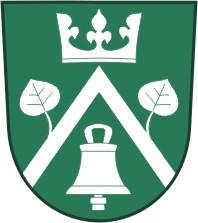
- Flag Coat of arms

- Location in the Czech Republic
- Coordinates: 49°56′21″N 14°14′14″E
- Country: Czech Republic
- Region: Central Bohemian
- District: Beroun
- First mentioned: 1338

Area
  - Total: 7.02 km^{2} (2.71 sq mi)
- Elevation: 342 m (1,122 ft)

Population (2026-01-01)
  - Total: 168
  - Density: 23.9/km^{2} (62.0/sq mi)
- Time zone: UTC+1 (CET)
  - Summer (DST): UTC+2 (CEST)
- Postal code: 267 18
- Website: www.morinka.eu

Mořinka is a municipality and village in Beroun District in the Central Bohemian Region of the Czech Republic. It has about 200 inhabitants.

== Demographics ==
Historical population
Year	Pop.	±%
1869	274	—
1880	297	+8.4%
1890	275	−7.4%
1900	290	+5.5%
1910	254	−12.4%
1921	241	−5.1%
1930	252	+4.6%
1950	237	−6.0%
1961	186	−21.5%
1970	200	+7.5%
1980	152	−24.0%
1991	126	−17.1%
2001	112	−11.1%
2011	142	+26.8%
2021	184	+29.6%
Source: Censuses
