= Běštín =

- Municipality
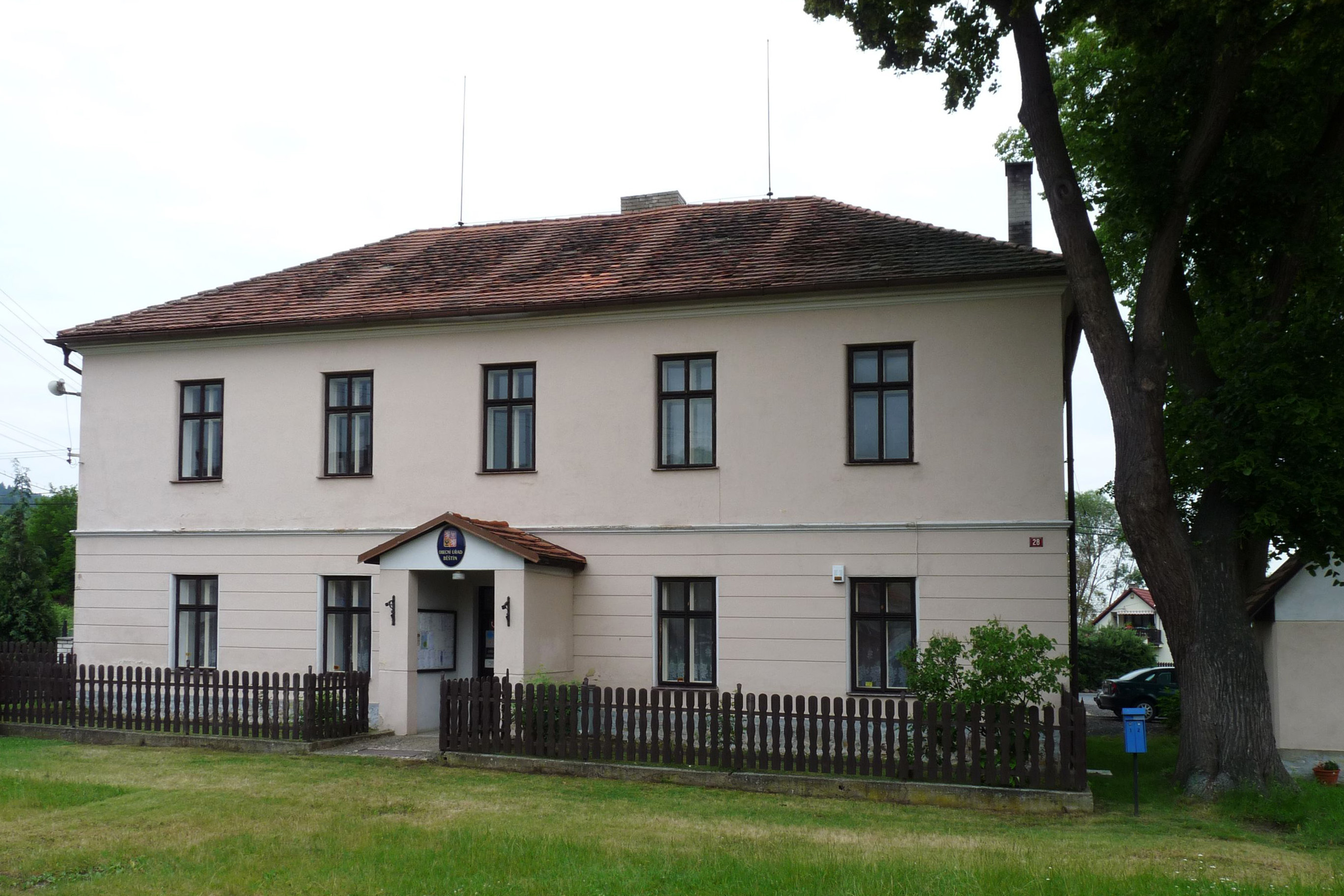
- Municipal office

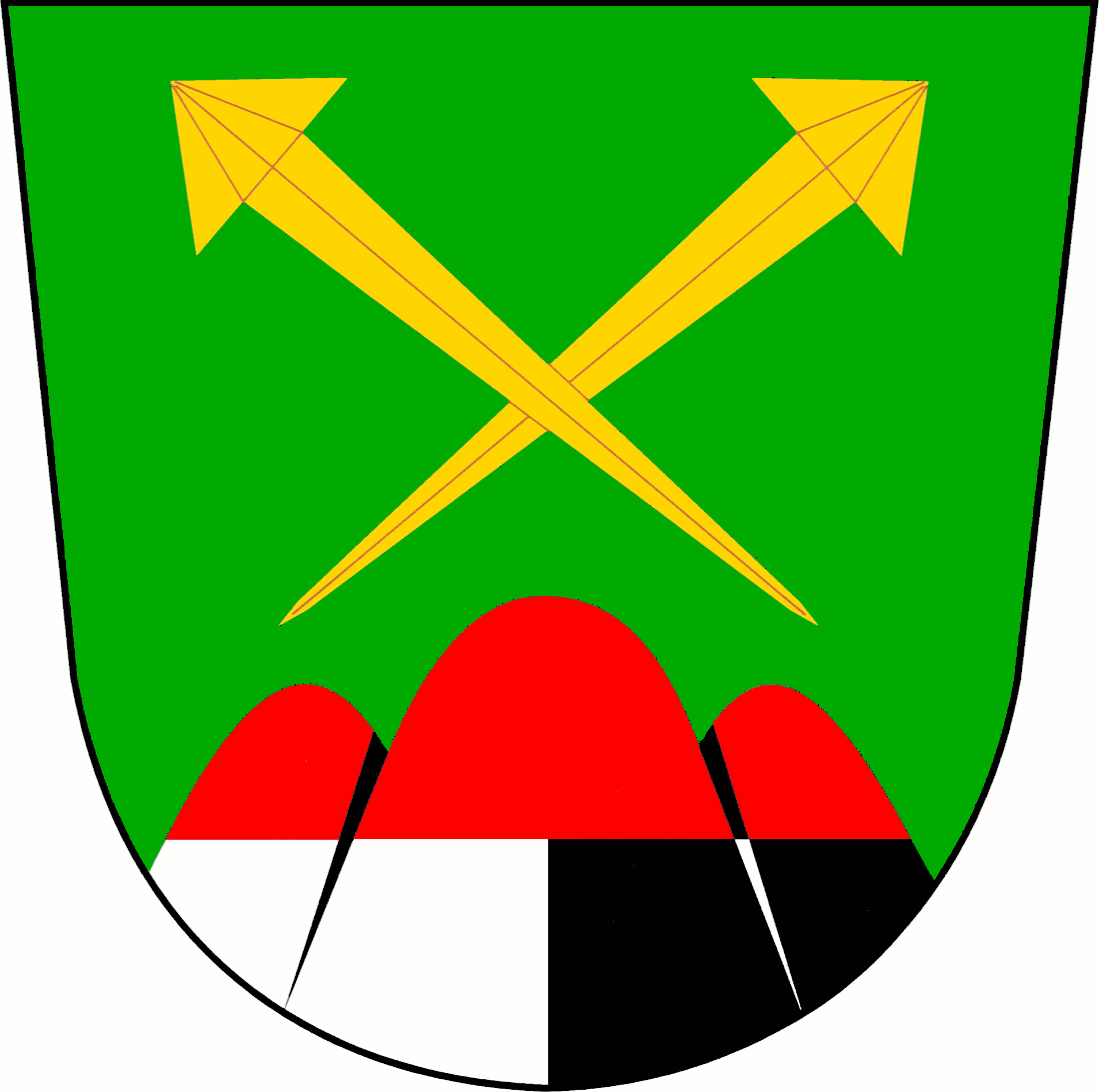
- Flag Coat of arms

- Location in the Czech Republic
- Coordinates: 49°48′27″N 14°0′59″E
- Country: Czech Republic
- Region: Central Bohemian
- District: Beroun
- First mentioned: 1406

Area
  - Total: 3.01 km^{2} (1.16 sq mi)
- Elevation: 375 m (1,230 ft)

Population (2026-01-01)
  - Total: 341
  - Density: 113/km^{2} (293/sq mi)
- Time zone: UTC+1 (CET)
  - Summer (DST): UTC+2 (CEST)
- Postal code: 267 24
- Website: www.obecbestin.cz

Běštín (German: Biechczin) is a municipality and village in Beroun District in the Central Bohemian Region of the Czech Republic. It has about 300 inhabitants.

== Demographics ==
Historical population
Year	Pop.	±%
1869	827	—
1880	852	+3.0%
1890	889	+4.3%
1900	884	−0.6%
1910	904	+2.3%
1921	765	−15.4%
1930	661	−13.6%
1950	482	−27.1%
1961	533	+10.6%
1970	422	−20.8%
1980	360	−14.7%
1991	284	−21.1%
2001	276	−2.8%
2011	289	+4.7%
2021	331	+14.5%
Source: Censuses
