= Jivina (Beroun District) =

- Municipality
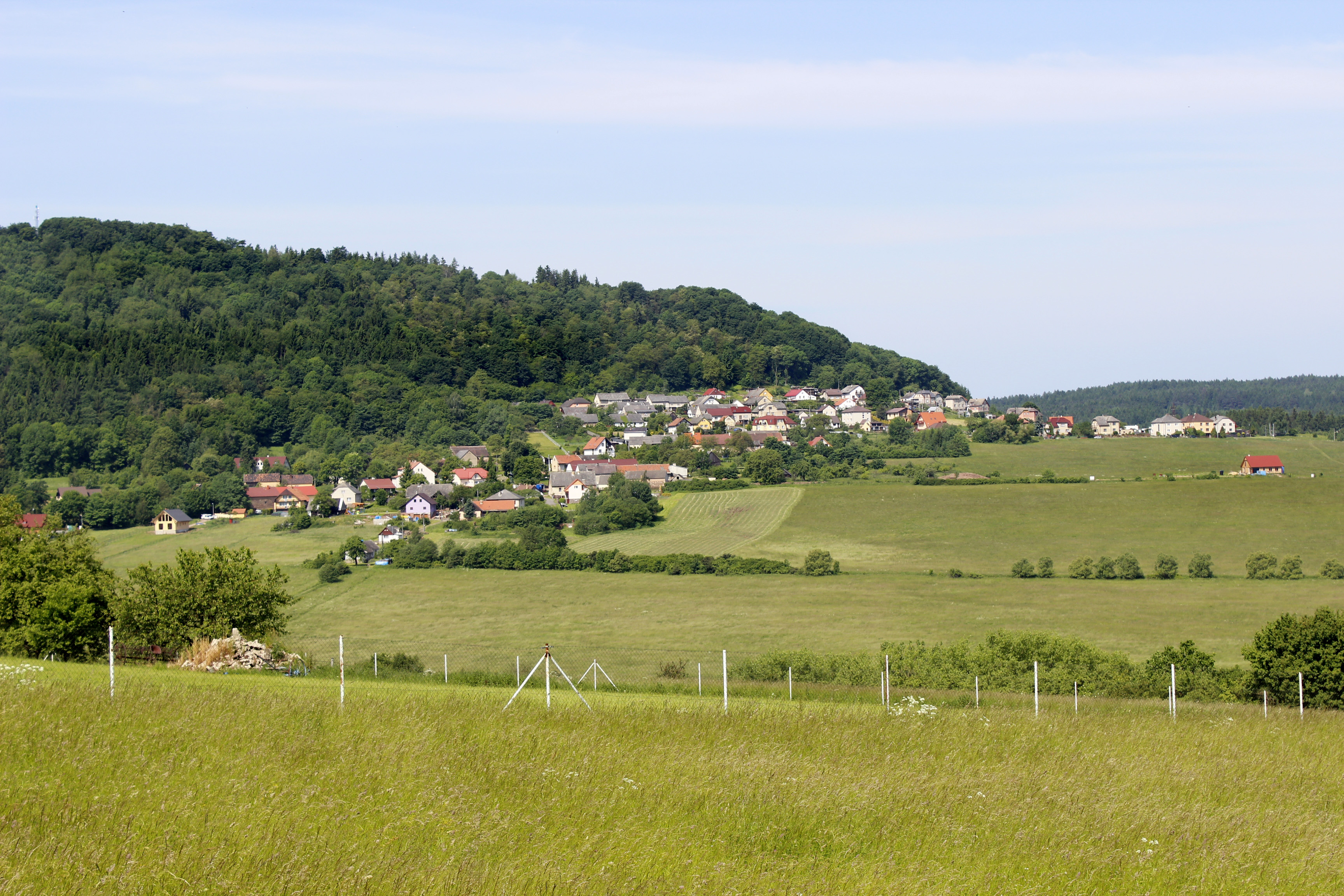
- View from the west

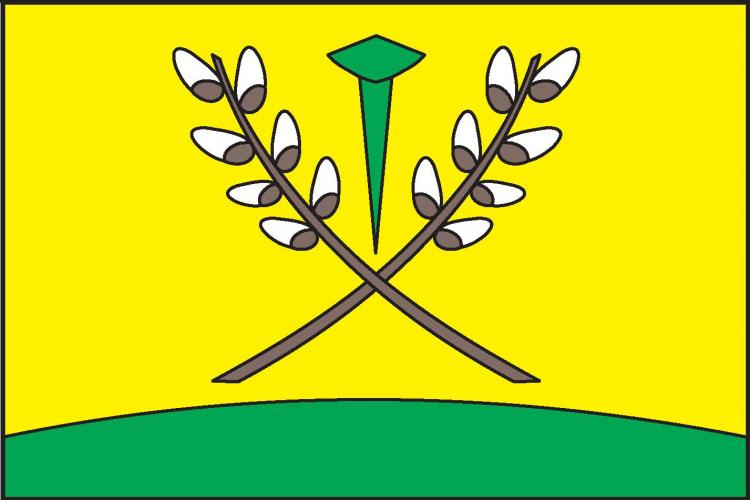
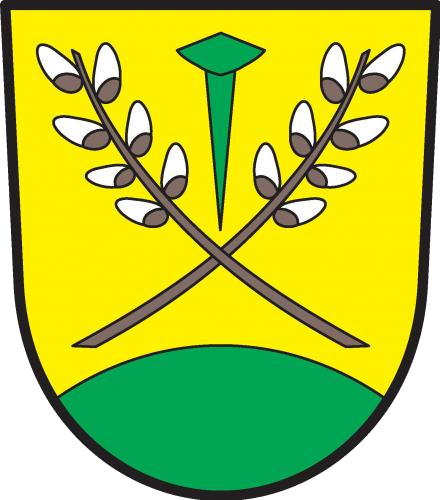
- Flag Coat of arms

- Location in the Czech Republic
- Coordinates: 49°47′37″N 13°50′16″E
- Country: Czech Republic
- Region: Central Bohemian
- District: Beroun
- First mentioned: 1368

Area
  - Total: 4.54 km^{2} (1.75 sq mi)
- Elevation: 490 m (1,610 ft)

Population (2026-01-01)
  - Total: 201
  - Density: 44.3/km^{2} (115/sq mi)
- Time zone: UTC+1 (CET)
  - Summer (DST): UTC+2 (CEST)
- Postal code: 267 62
- Website: www.jivina-be.cz

Jivina is a municipality and village in Beroun District in the Central Bohemian Region of the Czech Republic. It has about 200 inhabitants.

== Demographics ==
Historical population
Year	Pop.	±%
1869	449	—
1880	405	−9.8%
1890	379	−6.4%
1900	385	+1.6%
1910	376	−2.3%
1921	347	−7.7%
1930	349	+0.6%
1950	301	−13.8%
1961	268	−11.0%
1970	253	−5.6%
1980	194	−23.3%
1991	177	−8.8%
2001	180	+1.7%
2011	183	+1.7%
2021	207	+13.1%
Source: Censuses
