= TME =

TME may refer to:

- TME (operating system), Transaction Machine Environment, former ICL computer operating system
- TME (psychedelics), drugs
- Tencent Music Entertainment Group, music distribution company
- Total mesorectal excision, removal of cancerous bowel tissue
- Toyota Motor Europe
- Transmissible mink encephalopathy
- Trimethylolethane, a triol, an organic compound
- Tumor microenvironment
- Tickle Me Elmo
