= Bykoš =

- Municipality
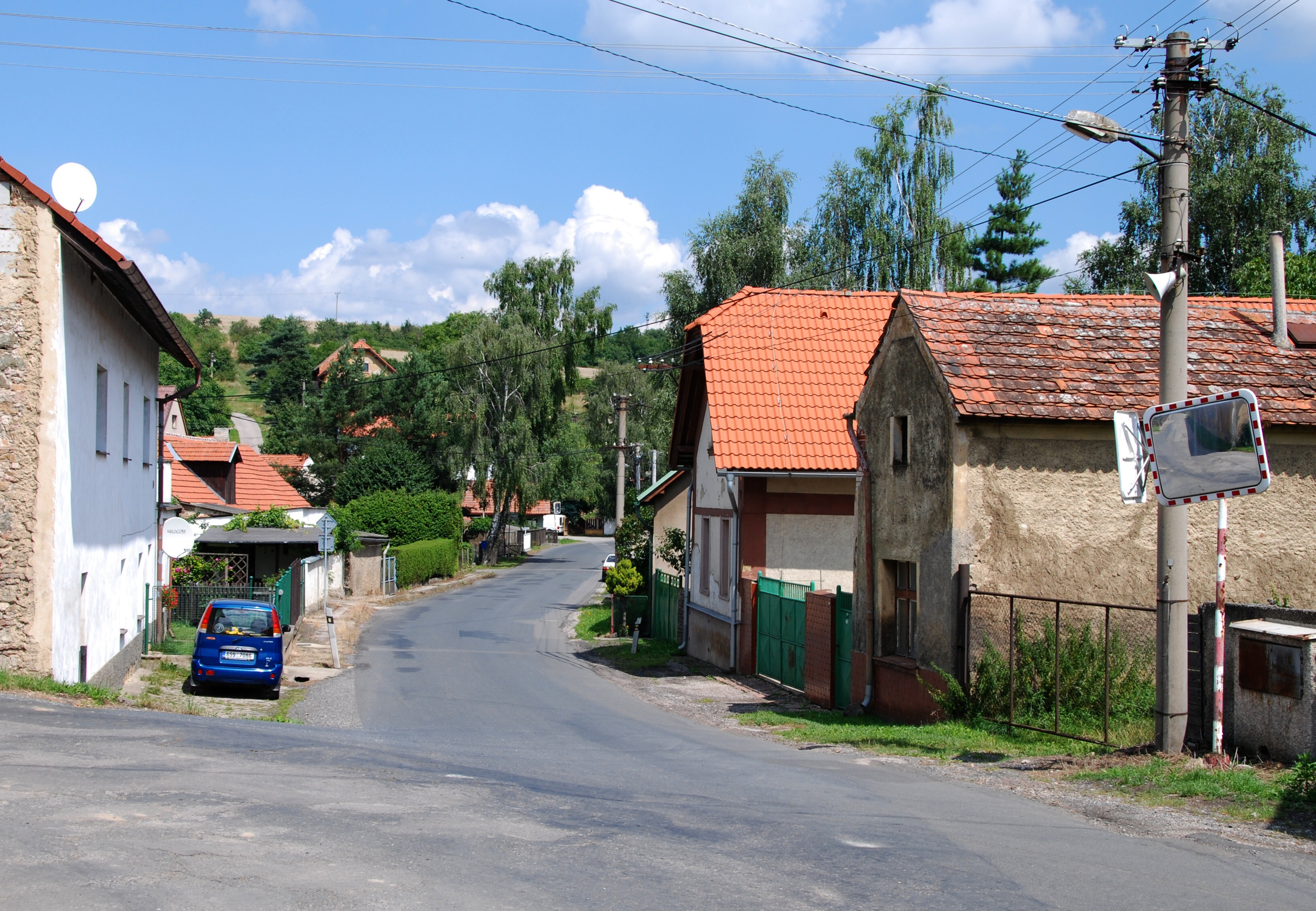
- Crossroads in Bykoš

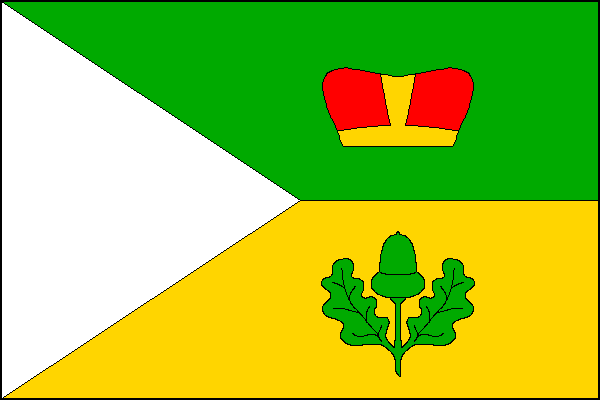
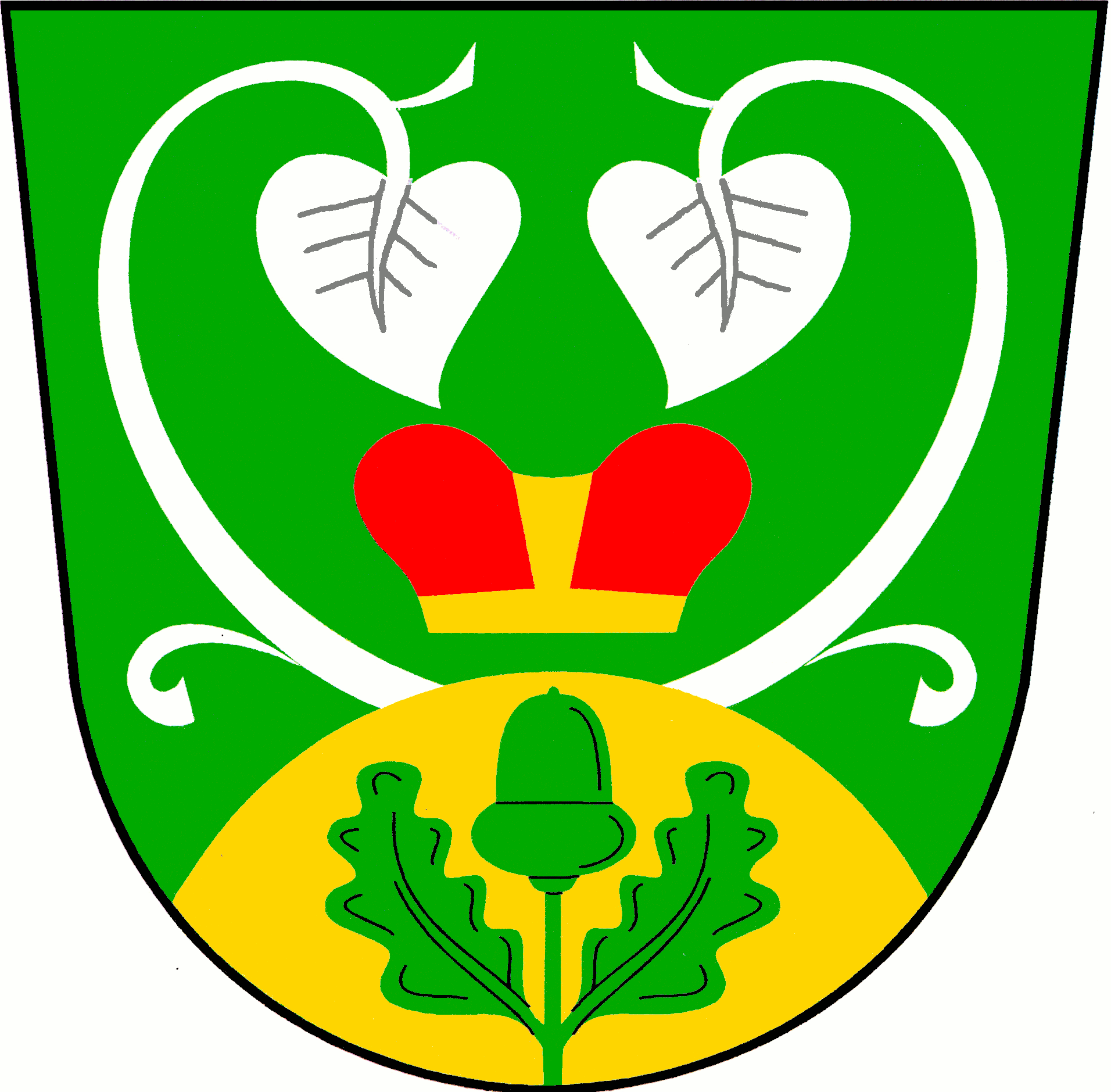
- Flag Coat of arms

- Location in the Czech Republic
- Coordinates: 49°52′59″N 14°3′49″E
- Country: Czech Republic
- Region: Central Bohemian
- District: Beroun
- First mentioned: 1170

Area
  - Total: 4.07 km^{2} (1.57 sq mi)
- Elevation: 370 m (1,210 ft)

Population (2026-01-01)
  - Total: 256
  - Density: 62.9/km^{2} (163/sq mi)
- Time zone: UTC+1 (CET)
  - Summer (DST): UTC+2 (CEST)
- Postal code: 267 01
- Website: www.bykos.cz

Bykoš is a municipality and village in Beroun District in the Central Bohemian Region of the Czech Republic. It has about 300 inhabitants.

== Etymology ==
The name is probably derived from the personal name Bykoš. He could have been the founder of the settlement or its oldest inhabitant.

== Geography ==
Bykoš is located about 9 kilometres (6 mi) south of Beroun and 30 km (19 mi) southwest of Prague. It lies in an agricultural landscape in the Hořovice Uplands. The highest point is at 428 m (1,404 ft) above sea level. The northeastern part of the municipality extends into the Bohemian Karst Protected Landscape Area.

== History ==
The first written mention of Bykoš is from 1170.

== Demographics ==
Historical population

Year	Pop.	±%
1869	447	—
1880	466	+4.3%
1890	450	−3.4%
1900	481	+6.9%
1910	531	+10.4%

Year	Pop.	±%
1921	495	−6.8%
1930	426	−13.9%
1950	330	−22.5%
1961	286	−13.3%
1970	307	+7.3%

Year	Pop.	±%
1980	229	−25.4%
1991	187	−18.3%
2001	196	+4.8%
2011	217	+10.7%
2021	239	+10.1%

Source: Censuses

== Transport ==
There are no railways or major roads passing through the municipality.

== Sights ==
There are no protected cultural monuments in the municipality. The main historical landmark of the centre of Bykoš is a chapel.
