= Václav Treitz =

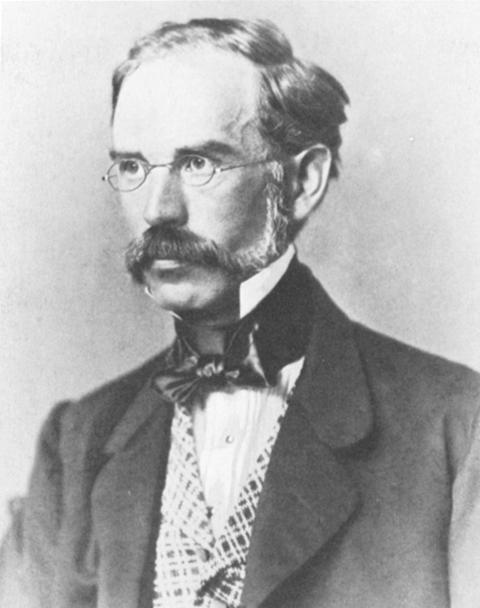
Václav Treitz

Václav Treitz (German: Wenzel Treitz; 9 April 1819 – 27 August 1872) was a Czech pathologist.

== Biography ==
Treitz was born on 9 April 1819 in Hostomice, Bohemia. He studied medicine in Prague, and performed post-graduate studies in Vienna with Joseph Hyrtl (1810–1894). Subsequently, he practiced medicine at the Jagellonian University in Kraków, returning to Prague in 1855, where he became a professor and director of the institute of pathological anatomy.

Throughout his career, Treitz was a figure in the struggle for Czech nationalism. On 27 August 1872, at the age of 53, he committed suicide by ingesting potassium cyanide.

== Named structures ==
Treitz is remembered for his 1853 description of the suspensory muscle of the duodenum (musculus suspensorius duodeni), later being named the "ligament of Treitz" (also known as Treitz muscle). This ligament is a fibrous structure by which the duodenojejunal junction is fixed to the right crus of the diaphragm. His name is attached to several other anatomical terms:

- "Angle of Treitz": sharp curve at the duodenojejunal junction.
- "Treitz arch" (plica paraduodenalis or paraduodenal fold): a sickle-shaped fold of peritoneum that forms the anterior boundary of the paraduodenal recess.
- "Treitz fascia": fascia behind the head of the pancreas.
- "Treitz fossa": subcaecal fossa, a depression in the peritoneum extending posterior to the caecum.
- "Treitz hernia": a duodenojejunal hernia; a hernia in the subperitoneal tissues.
