= Lužce =

- Municipality
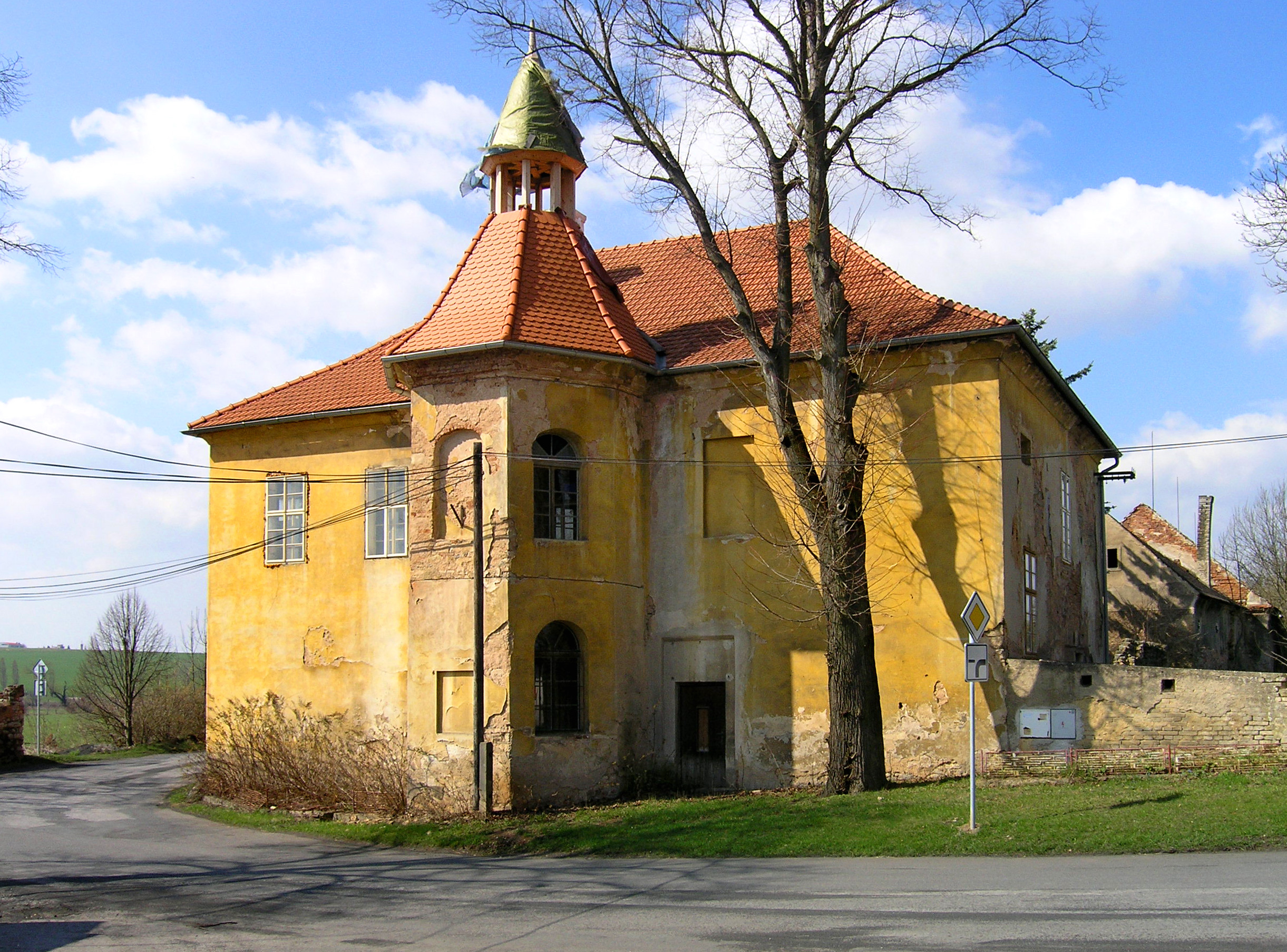
- Lužce Castle

- Location in the Czech Republic
- Coordinates: 49°59′3″N 14°11′48″E
- Country: Czech Republic
- Region: Central Bohemian
- District: Beroun
- First mentioned: 1367

Area
  - Total: 3.01 km^{2} (1.16 sq mi)
- Elevation: 390 m (1,280 ft)

Population (2026-01-01)
  - Total: 146
  - Density: 48.5/km^{2} (126/sq mi)
- Time zone: UTC+1 (CET)
  - Summer (DST): UTC+2 (CEST)
- Postal code: 267 18
- Website: www.luzce.eu

Lužce is a municipality and village in Beroun District in the Central Bohemian Region of the Czech Republic. It has about 100 inhabitants.

== Geography ==
Lužce is located about 9 kilometres (6 mi) east of Beroun and 15 km (9 mi) west of Prague. It lies in the Hořovice Uplands. The highest point is at 428 m (1,404 ft) above sea level. There is a system of small fishponds, supplied by the stream Karlický potok.

== Demographics ==
Historical population
Year	Pop.	±%
1869	191	—
1880	203	+6.3%
1890	223	+9.9%
1900	212	−4.9%
1910	225	+6.1%
1921	226	+0.4%
1930	252	+11.5%
1950	129	−48.8%
1961	147	+14.0%
1970	132	−10.2%
1980	112	−15.2%
1991	91	−18.8%
2001	96	+5.5%
2011	122	+27.1%
2021	155	+27.0%
Source: Censuses
