= Takedown =

Takedown or take down may refer to:

== Books ==
- Takedown: The Pursuit and Capture of America's Most Wanted Computer Outlaw, by John Markoff and Tsutomu Shimomura
- The Takedown: A Suburban Mom, a Coal Miner's Son, and the Unlikely Demise of Colombia's Brutal Norte Valle Cartel, by Jeffrey Robinson

== Film and television ==
=== Film ===
- Take Down (1979 film), about a high school wrestling team
- Track Down, a 2000 film known as Takedown outside the U.S., based on the book titled Takedown
- Takedown (2010 film), also known as Transparency
- Take Down (2016 film), also known as Billionaire Ransom
- The Takedown, 2022 film

=== TV ===
- "Takedown", a Rookie Blue TV series episode

== Video games ==
- Takedown: Red Sabre
- Burnout 3: Takedown

== Other uses ==
- Takedown (grappling), a martial arts technique
- Takedown gun, a rifle or shotgun designed for easy disassembly
- "Takedown" (song), a song from the soundtrack of KPop Demon Hunters
- Colostomy takedown, a surgical procedure
