= Hostomice (Beroun District) =

- Town
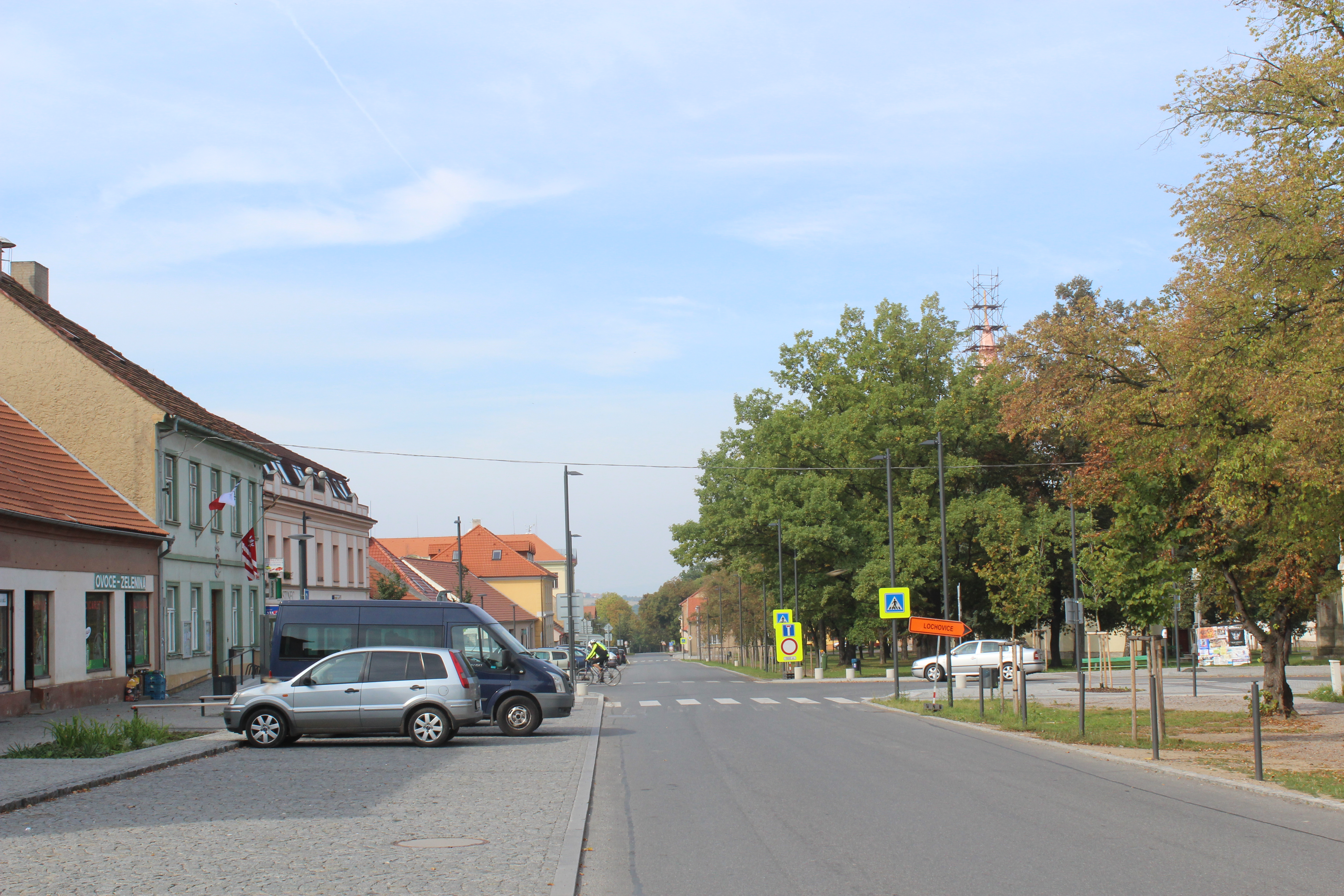
- The square Tyršovo náměstí

- Flag Coat of arms

- Location in the Czech Republic
- Coordinates: 49°49′31″N 14°2′44″E
- Country: Czech Republic
- Region: Central Bohemian
- District: Beroun
- First mentioned: 1343

Government
  - Mayor: Jan Bomba

Area
  - Total: 28.26 km^{2} (10.91 sq mi)
- Elevation: 361 m (1,184 ft)

Population (2026-01-01)
  - Total: 1,961
  - Density: 69.39/km^{2} (179.7/sq mi)
- Time zone: UTC+1 (CET)
  - Summer (DST): UTC+2 (CEST)
- Postal code: 267 24
- Website: www.hostomice.cz

Hostomice (Czech pronunciation: [ˈɦostomɪtsɛ]) is a town in Beroun District in the Central Bohemian Region of the Czech Republic. It has about 2,000 inhabitants. The town proper is located on the Chumava Stream in the Hořovice Uplands. Hostomice is known for its large town square with the Church of the Establishment of Saint Peter in Antioch.

== Administrative division ==
Hostomice consists of four municipal parts (in brackets population according to the 2021 census):

- Hostomice (1,505)
- Bezdědice (144)
- Lštěň (43)
- Radouš (175)

== Etymology ==
The name is derived from the personal name Hostoma, meaning "the village of Hostoma's people".

== Geography ==
Hostomice is located about 15 kilometres (9 mi) south of Beroun and 33 km (21 mi) southwest of Prague. It lies mostly in the Hořovice Uplands, including the built-up area. The southern part of the municipal territory, which is hilly and forested, extends into the Brdy Highlands. The highest point is at 644 m (2,113 ft) above sea level. The Chumava Stream flows through the town.

== History ==
The first written mention of Hostomice is from 1343. From 1357 until the establishment of an independent municipality in 1850, Hostomice was part of the Karlštejn estate. The village was promoted to a town in 1738. Historically, the town is associated with hand-made nails and pottery.

== Demographics ==
Historical population

Year	Pop.	±%
1869	3,175	—
1880	3,236	+1.9%
1890	2,909	−10.1%
1900	3,039	+4.5%
1910	2,841	−6.5%

Year	Pop.	±%
1921	2,569	−9.6%
1930	2,463	−4.1%
1950	2,079	−15.6%
1961	2,113	+1.6%
1970	1,906	−9.8%

Year	Pop.	±%
1980	1,735	−9.0%
1991	1,556	−10.3%
2001	1,530	−1.7%
2011	1,701	+11.2%
2021	1,867	+9.8%

Source: Censuses

== Transport ==
Hostomice is located on the railway line Lochovice–Zadní Třebaň.

== Sights ==
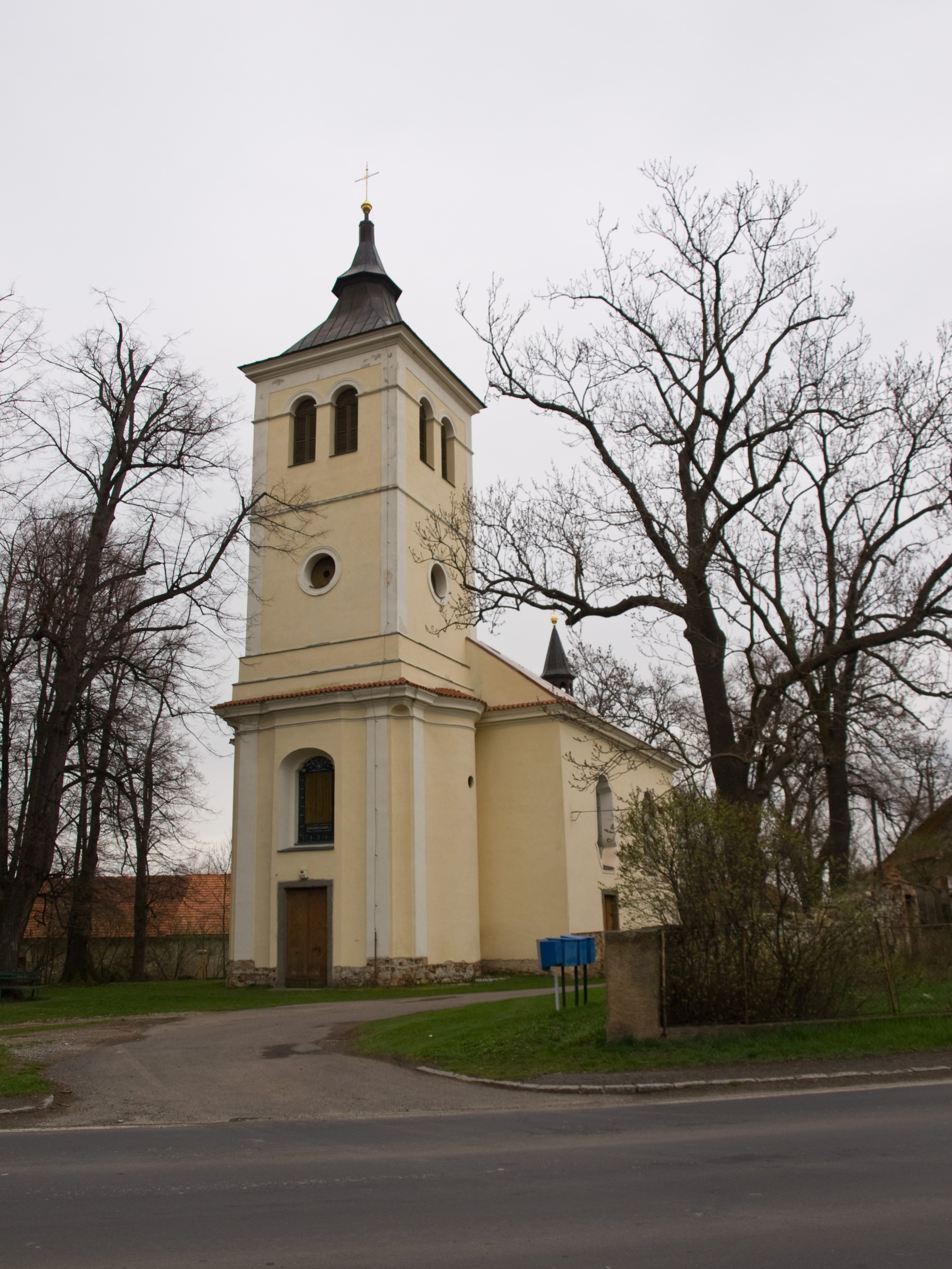
Church of the Assumption of the Virgin Mary

Hostomice has a unique town square, which belongs to the largest in the country. The main landmark of the town square is the Church of the Establishment of Saint Peter in Antioch. It is a late Baroque church with a later added tower and an Empire façade. Another landmarks of the town square are a Marian column and a statue of Saint John of Nepomuk from 1871.

The Church of the Assumption of the Virgin Mary in Bezdědice was first mentioned in 1343. It is originally a Gothic building, which was rebuilt in the Baroque style after a fire in 1779.

There is a Jewish cemetery with 160 preserved tombstones at the southwestern municipal border.

== Notable people ==
- Václav Treitz (1819–1872), pathologist
