= Suspensory muscle of duodenum =

Muscle between the duodenum and jejunum

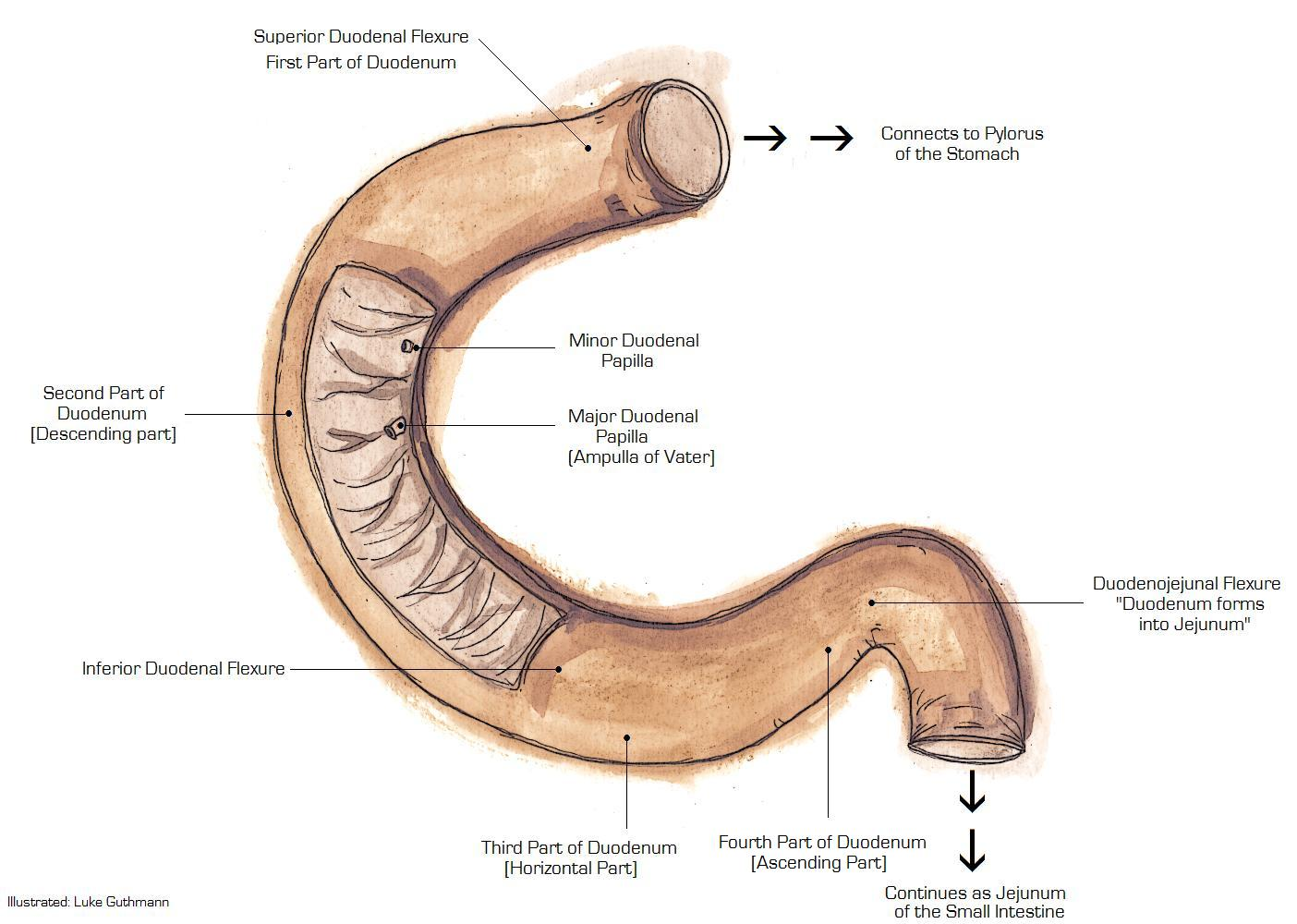
- The duodenum. The suspensory muscle of the duodenum attaches to the duodenojejunal flexure, shown.

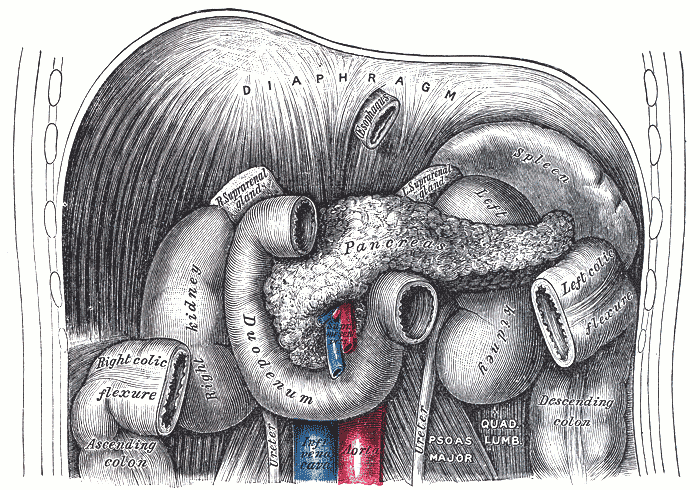
- The duodenum and jejunum depicted in situ. The suspensory muscle of the duodenum connects posteriorly to the duodenojejunal flexure, behind the pancreas, shown.

Details
- System: Gastrointestinal
- Origin: Connective tissue surrounding celiac artery and superior mesenteric artery
- Insertion: Third and fourth-parts of duodenum, duodenojejunal flexure
- Nerve: Celiac plexus, Superior mesenteric plexus
- Actions: Facilitates movement of food; embryological role in fixating jejunum during gut rotation

Identifiers
- Latin: musculus suspensorius duodeni, ligamentum suspensorium duodeni
- TA98: A05.6.02.011
- TA2: 3781
- FMA: 20509

The suspensory muscle of duodenum (also known as suspensory ligament of duodenum, Treitz's muscle or ligament of Treitz) is a thin muscle connecting the junction between the duodenum and jejunum (the small intestine's first and second parts, respectively), as well as the duodenojejunal flexure to connective tissue surrounding the superior mesenteric and coeliac arteries. The suspensory muscle most often connects to both the third and fourth parts of the duodenum, as well as the duodenojejunal flexure, although the attachment is quite variable.

The suspensory muscle marks the formal division between the duodenum and the jejunum. This division is used to mark the difference between the upper and lower gastrointestinal tracts, which is relevant in clinical medicine as it may determine the source of gastrointestinal bleeding.

The suspensory muscle is derived from mesoderm and plays a role in the embryological rotation of the gut, by offering a point of fixation for the rotating gut. It is also thought to help digestion by widening the angle of the duodenojejunal flexure. Superior mesenteric artery syndrome is a rare abnormality caused by a congenitally short suspensory muscle.

== Structure ==
The duodenum and the jejunum are the first and second parts of the small intestine, respectively. The suspensory muscle of the duodenum marks their formal division. The suspensory muscle arises from the right crus of the diaphragm as it passes around the esophagus, continues as connective tissue around the stems of the celiac artery and superior mesenteric artery, passes behind the pancreas, and enters the upper part of the mesentery, inserting into the junction between the duodenum and jejunum, the duodenojejunal flexure. Here, the muscles are continuous with the muscular layers of the duodenum.

=== Variation ===
Considerable anatomic variation exists, in terms of length and point of attachment. Despite the classical description, the muscle only solely attaches to the duodenojejunal flexure in about 8% of people; it is far more common, 40 to 60% of the time to attach additionally to the third and fourth parts of the duodenum; and 20 to 30% of the time it only attaches to the third and fourth parts. Moreover, separate multiple attachments are not that uncommon.

According to some authors, who use the original description by Treitz, the muscle may be divided into two sections: a ligamentous portion attaching the right crus of diaphragm to the connective tissue surrounding the coeliac artery and superior mesenteric artery; and a lower muscular portion from the connective tissue attaching to the duodenum. The superior portion is also described as the Hilfsmuskel. These two parts are now considered anatomically distinct, with the suspensory muscle referring solely to the lower structure attaching at the duodenum.

== Function ==
The ligament contains a slender band of skeletal muscle from the diaphragm and a fibromuscular band of smooth muscle from the horizontal and ascending parts of the duodenum. When it contracts, by virtue of connections to the third and fourth parts of the duodenum, the suspensory muscle of the duodenum widens the angle of the duodenojejunal flexure, allowing movement of the intestinal contents.

=== Embryology ===
Embryologically, the suspensory muscle of the duodenum is derived from mesoderm. It plays an important role in the embryological rotation of the small intestine as the superior retention band.

== Clinical significance ==
This ligament is an important anatomical landmark of the duodenojejunal flexure, separating the upper and lower gastrointestinal tracts. For example, bloody vomit or melena, black tarry stools, usually indicate a gastrointestinal bleed from a location in the upper gastrointestinal tract. In contrast, hematochezia, bright red blood or clots in the stool, usually indicates gastrointestinal bleeding from the lower part of the gastrointestinal tract. It is an especially important landmark to note when looking at the bowel for the presence of malrotation of the gut, a syndrome often suspected in young children when they have episodes of recurrent vomiting. Visualising a normal location of the ligament of Treitz in radiological images is critical in ruling out malrotation of the gut in a child; it is abnormally located when malrotation is present.

During a Whipple's procedure, commonly used to treat pancreatic cancer by removing the pancreas, duodenum, and part of the jejunum, the ligament of Treitz is separated from the duodenum and preserved. When the remaining jejunum is anastamosed with the pylorus of the stomach, it may be passed through the ligament.

Superior mesenteric artery syndrome (SMA) is an extremely rare life-threatening condition that can either be congenital and chronic, or induced and acute. SMA Syndrome is characterised by compression of the duodenum between the abdominal aorta and the superior mesenteric artery, and may—when congenital—result from a short suspensory muscle. One surgical treatment is Strong's operation, which involves cutting the suspensory muscle, though this is not often carried out.

== History ==
The suspensory muscle of the duodenum was first named in 1853 by Václav Treitz, as the musculus suspensorius duodeni (in Latin), and described as consisting of a lower muscular portion with a broad base, and an upper tendinous portion blending with connective tissue around the origins of the superior mesenteric and coeliac arteries. It is commonly termed the ligament of Treitz by clinicians and as the suspensory muscle of the duodenum by anatomists. It has also been likened to "a polar ice cap ... a structure that many refer to but few have seen."

== Additional images ==
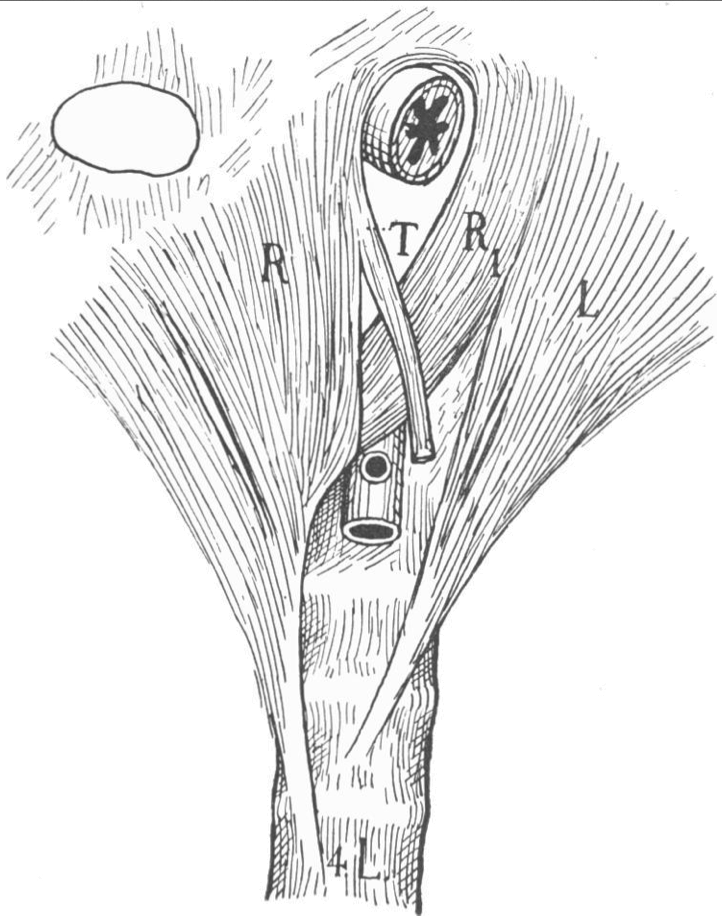
Depiction of the origin of the suspensory muscle, from the fibres of the right diaphragmatic crus

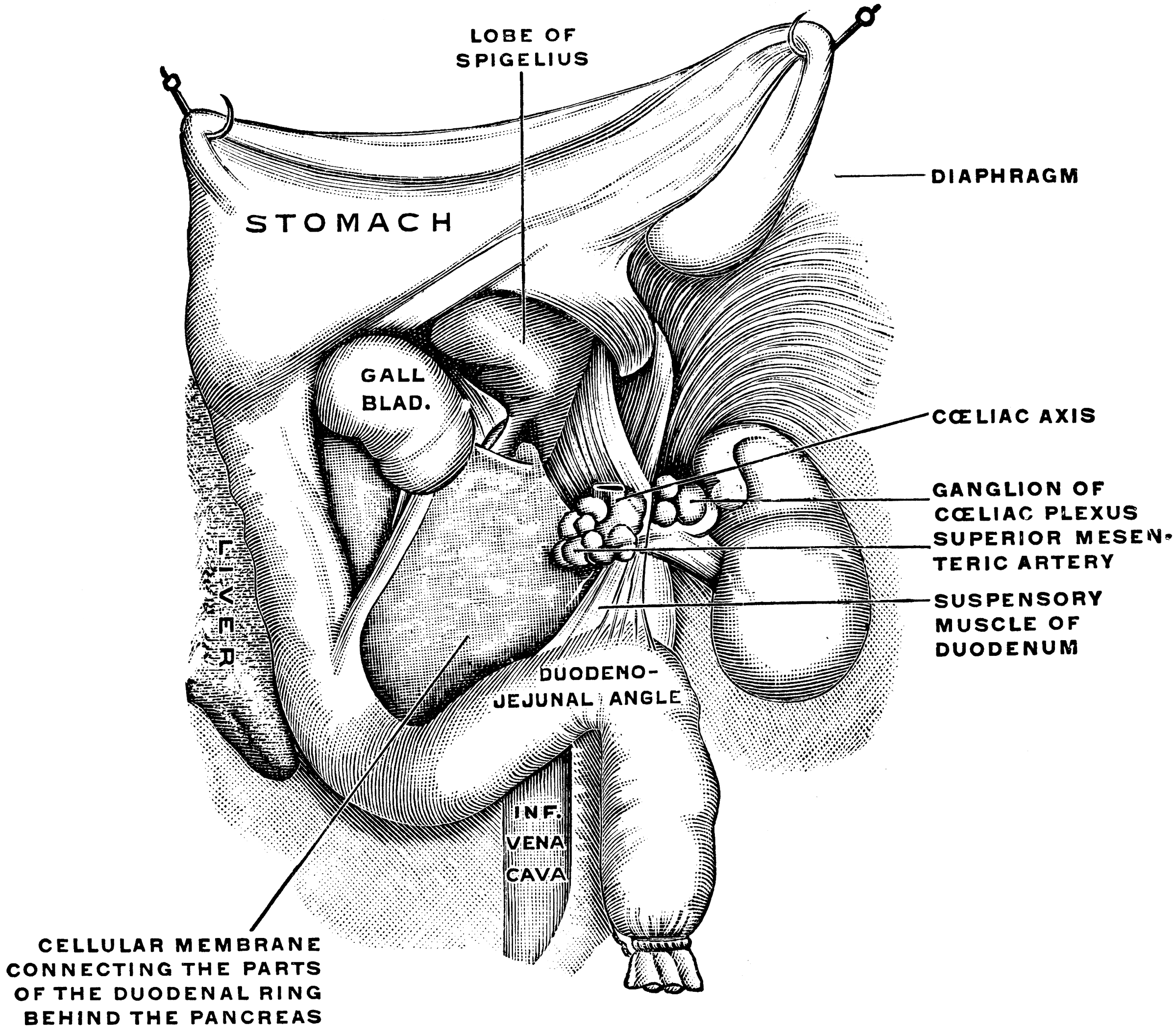
Suspensory muscle of the duodenum or muscle of Treitz seen in a ventral view.
