= Carl Toldt =

Austrian anatomist (1840–1920)

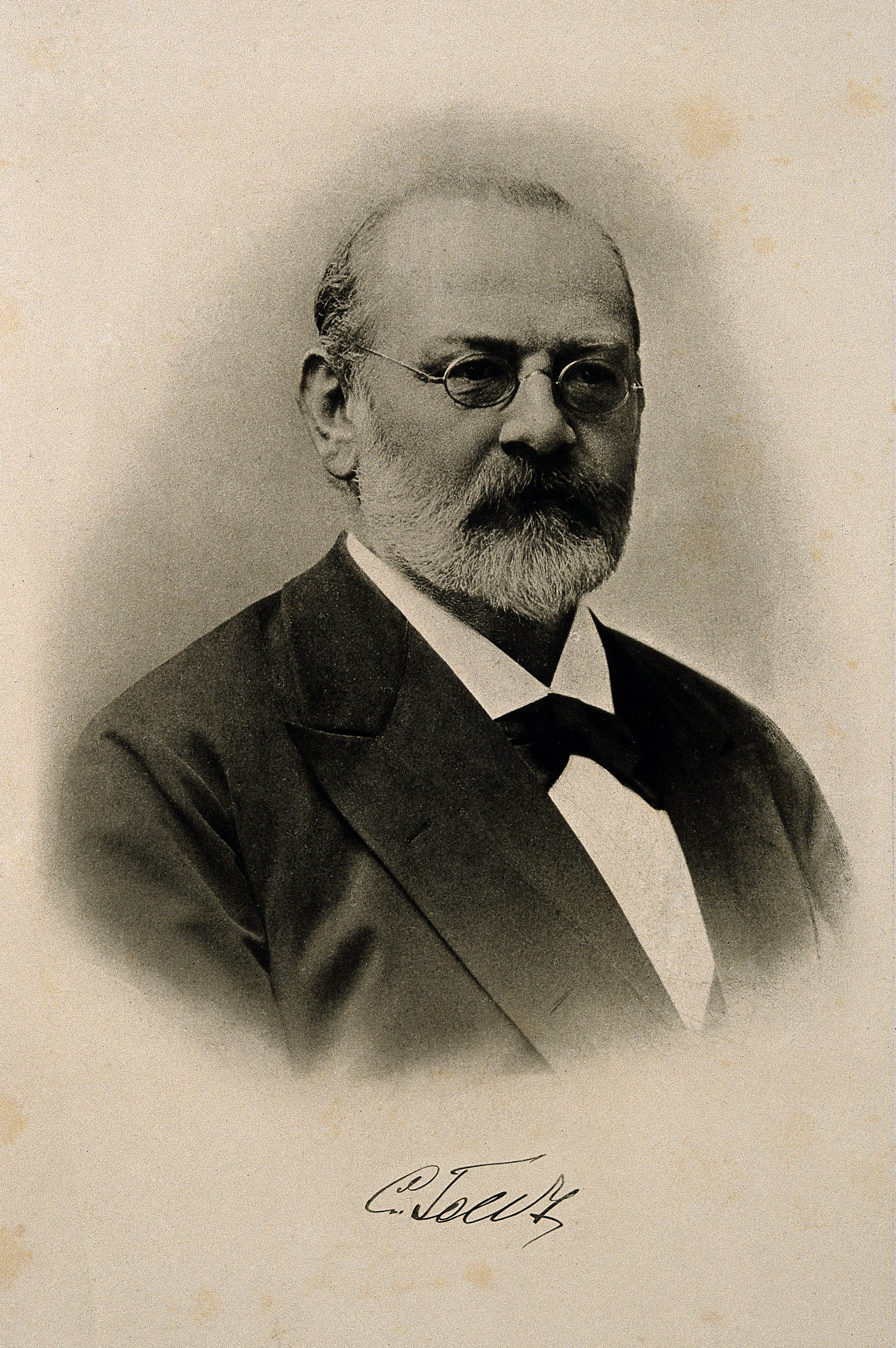
Carl Toldt

Carl Toldt, sometimes Karl Toldt (3 May 1840 – 13 November 1920) was an Austrian anatomist who was a native of Bruneck, South Tyrol.

In 1864 he earned his medical doctorate in Vienna, and was later a professor of anatomy in Prague and Vienna. He was the author of the popular "Anatomischer Atlas für Studirende und Ärzte" ("An atlas of human anatomy for students and physicians"), a work that was later translated into English.

His name is lent to the following four anatomical eponyms:

- Toldt's fascia: Continuation of Treitz's fascia behind the body of the pancreas.
- "Toldt's fascia flap": A recent technique for repairing large diaphragmatic hernias.
- "Toldt's membrane": The anterior layer of the renal fascia.
- "White line of Toldt": Lateral reflection of posterior parietal peritoneum of abdomen over the mesentery of the ascending and descending colon. The white line of Toldt represents the avascular plane for incision and is the anterior confluence of the colonic visceral peritoneum with the parietal peritoneum of the lateral abdominal wall.

In 1932 Karl-Toldt-Weg in Vienna's District 14 (Penzing) was named in his honor.
