= Colostomy =

Surgical procedure in which a hole is cut into the colon and stoma is placed

- Diagram showing a colostomy
- ICD-9-CM: 46.1
- MeSH: D003125
- MedlinePlus: 002942

A colostomy is an opening (stoma) in the large intestine (colon), or the surgical procedure that creates one. The opening is formed by drawing the healthy end of the colon through an incision in the anterior abdominal wall and suturing it into place. This opening, often in conjunction with an attached ostomy system, provides an alternative channel for feces to leave the body. Thus if the natural anus is unavailable for that function (for example, in cases where it has been removed as part of treatment for colorectal cancer or ulcerative colitis), an artificial anus takes over. It may be reversible or irreversible, depending on the circumstances.

== Uses ==
There are many reasons for this procedure. Some common reasons are:

- A part of the colon has been removed, e.g. due to colon cancer requiring a total mesorectal excision, diverticulitis, injury, etc., so that it is no longer possible for feces to exit via the anus.
- A part of the colon has been operated upon and needs to be 'rested' until it is healed. In this case, the colostomy is often temporary and is usually reversed at a later date, leaving the patient with a small scar in place of the stoma. Children undergoing surgery for extensive pelvic tumors commonly are given a colostomy in preparation for surgery to remove the tumor, followed by reversal of the colostomy.
- Fecal incontinence that is not responsive to other treatments.

== Types ==
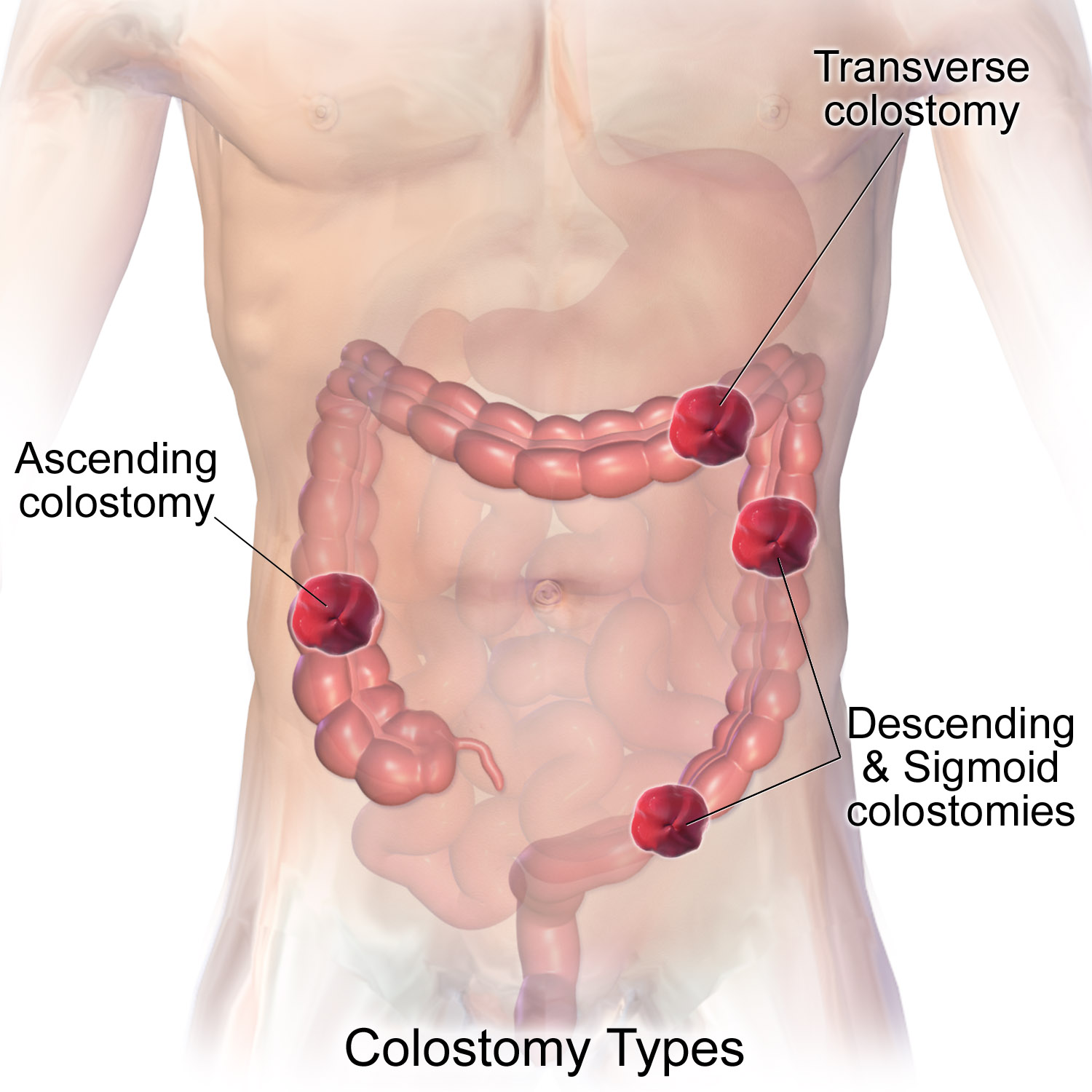
Illustration depicting various types of colostomy

Types of colostomy include:

- Loop colostomy: This type of colostomy is usually used in emergencies and is a temporary and large stoma. A loop of the bowel is pulled out onto the abdomen and held in place with an external device. The bowel is then sutured to the abdomen and two openings are created in the one stoma: one for stool and the other for mucus.
- End colostomy: A stoma is created from one end of the bowel. The other portion of the bowel is either removed or sewn shut (Hartmann's procedure).
- Double barrel colostomy: The bowel is severed and both ends are brought out onto the abdomen. Only the proximal stoma is functioning. Most often, double-barrel colostomy is a temporary colostomy with two openings into the colon (distal and proximal). The elimination occurs through the proximal stoma.

Colostomy surgery that is planned (elective) generally has better outcomes than surgery performed in an emergency situation; a 2014 population-based study found complication rates of 37% for elective ostomy procedures compared with 55% for emergency cases.

=== Duration ===
A colostomy may be temporary; and reversed at a later date; or permanent.

=== Alternatives ===
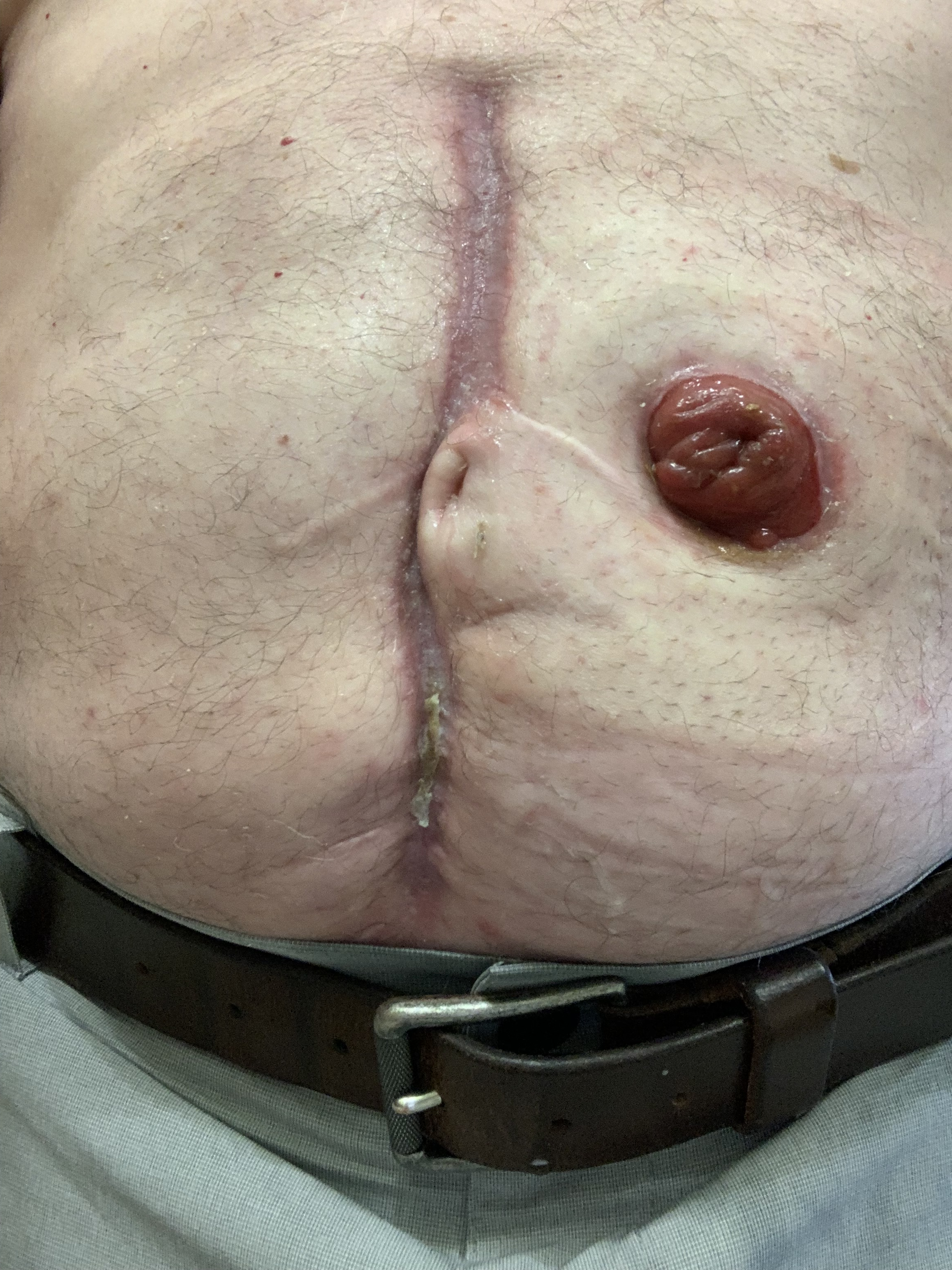
This photo shows an adult male's ostomy opening and the corresponding surgical scar.

Colostomy or ileostomy is now rarely performed for rectal cancer, with surgeons usually preferring primary resection and internal anastomosis, e.g. an ileo-anal pouch. In place of an external appliance, an internal ileo-anal pouch is constructed using a portion of the patient's lower intestine, to act as a new rectum to replace the removed original.

== Procedure ==
Placement of the stoma on the abdomen can occur at any location along the colon, but the most common placement is on the lower left side near the sigmoid where a majority of colon cancers occur. Other locations include the ascending, transverse, and descending sections of the colon.

== Routine care ==
Pouches and the stick-on appliances to which they attach must be changed regularly. Sometimes an odor neutralizer and lubricant is squirted into a new pouch before it is attached. Two types of pouches are available: one disposable and one drainable. Most pouches are opaque and filter out air through a charcoal filter. The recommended practice is to empty such pouches when one-third full. Appliances, in contrast with pouches, are usually replaced every three to seven days except in cases where their seals have broken contact with the skin, when they should be replaced immediately.

Even as long ago as the 1940s, surgeons conducting a review at the Cleveland Clinic (Jones and Kehm, 1946) could summarize the routine care of the permanent colostomy as usually quite satisfactory, stating that after patients recover from the initial worry prompted by the need for a colostomy, most of them learn to manage their colostomy quite well. "These patients come from all walks of life and carry on their daily work as usual. One patient stated that he could see no advantage of the normal anus over a colostomy. While this may be somewhat overstated, it is true that most people with a permanent colostomy can live a useful, happy life." They found that, just as in anyone else, dietary indiscretion was the usual factor in occasional bowel habit disruption. This historical experience has been borne out, as today the conclusion still stands that most patients can successfully manage a colostomy as part of their activities of daily living.

Jones and Kehm preferred tissue paper as a colostomy cover (held in place with a band or garment) rather than a colostomy bag. They found that irrigation of the colostomy varied with each patient's bowel habit but that most patients developed a routine of every-other-day irrigation, whereas a few needed no irrigation.

People with colostomies must wear an ostomy pouching system to collect intestinal waste. Ordinarily, the pouch must be emptied or changed a couple of times a day depending on the frequency of activity; in general the further from the anus (i.e., the further 'up' the intestinal tract) the ostomy is located the greater the output and more frequent the need to empty or change the pouch.

=== Colostomy and irrigation ===
People with colostomies who have ostomies of the sigmoid colon or descending colon may have the option of irrigation, which allows for the person to not wear a pouch, but rather just a gauze cap over the stoma, and to schedule irrigation for times that are convenient. To irrigate, a catheter is placed inside the stoma, and flushed with water, which allows the feces to come out of the body into an irrigation sleeve. Most colostomates irrigate once a day or every other day, though this depends on the person, their food intake, and their health.

== Complications ==
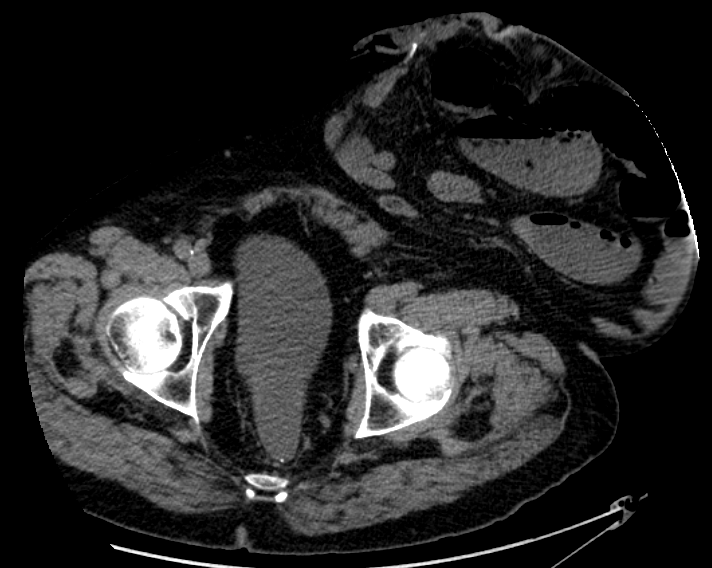
CT scan of same patient, showing intestines within the hernia.

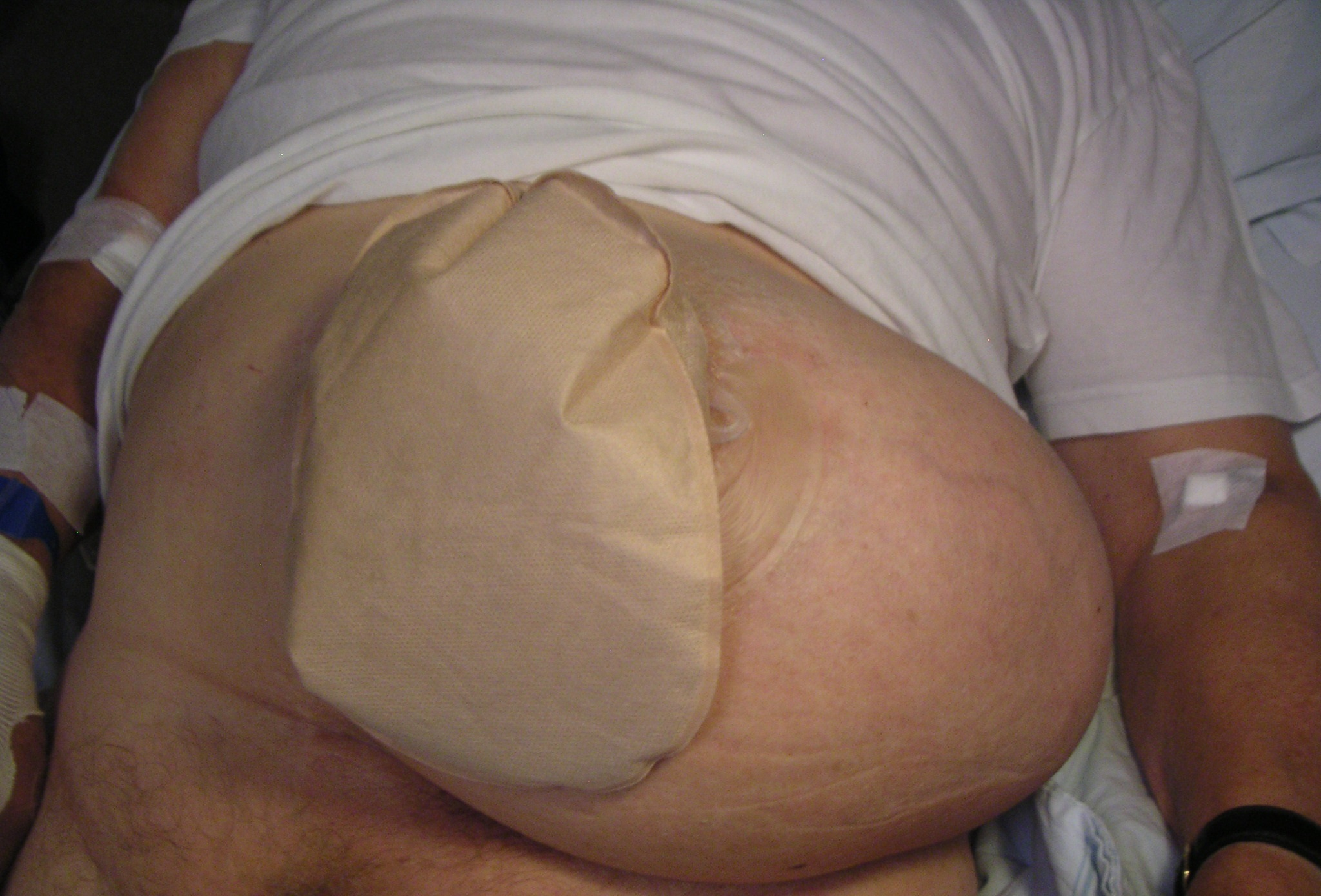
Patient with a colostomy complicated by a large parastomal hernia, which is when tissue protrudes adjacent to the stoma tract.

Parastomal hernia (PH) is the most common late complication of stomata through the abdominal wall, occurring in 10-25% of patients, even up to 50% by some estimates. Prolapse of bowel wall through the stoma is reported in 2–10% of colostomy patients and can require surgical revision.

Following reversal of a colostomy, purse-string skin closure has been associated with a lower risk of surgical site infection than linear skin closure, and may lead to higher patient satisfaction, though current evidence suggests little or no difference in incisional hernia or operative time.

Clinical pilates-based exercises have been demonstrated to improve patients' core abdominal strength and to reduce the risk of a hernia worsening.

Other common complications of colostomy are high output, skin irritation, prolapse, retraction, and ischemia.
