= Duodenojejunal flexure =

Border between the duodenum and the jejunum

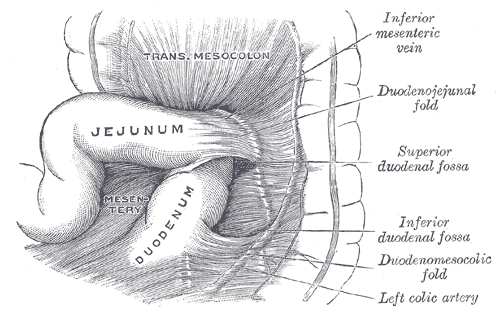
- Superior and inferior duodenal fossæ.

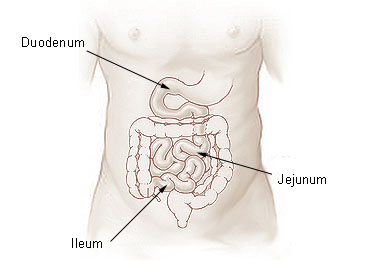
- Small intestine

Details

Identifiers
- Latin: flexura duodenojejunalis
- TA98: A05.6.02.009
- TA2: 2952
- FMA: 15957

The duodenojejunal flexure or duodenojejunal junction, also known as the angle of Treitz, is the border between the duodenum and the jejunum.

== Structure ==
The ascending portion of the duodenum ascends on the left side of the aorta, as far as the level of the upper border of the second lumbar vertebra. At this point, it turns abruptly forward to merge with the jejunum, forming the duodenojejunal flexure. This forms the beginning of the jejunum. The duodenojejunal flexure is surrounded by the suspensory muscle of the duodenum. It is retroperitoneal, so is less mobile than the jejunum that comes after it, helping to stabilise the jejunum.

The duodenojejunal flexure lies in front of the left psoas major muscle, the left renal artery, and the left renal vein. It is covered in front, and partly at the sides, by peritoneum continuous with the left portion of the mesentery.

== Clinical significance ==
The ligament of Treitz, a peritoneal fold, from the right crus of diaphragm, is an identification point for the duodenojejunal flexure during abdominal surgery.

== Additional images ==
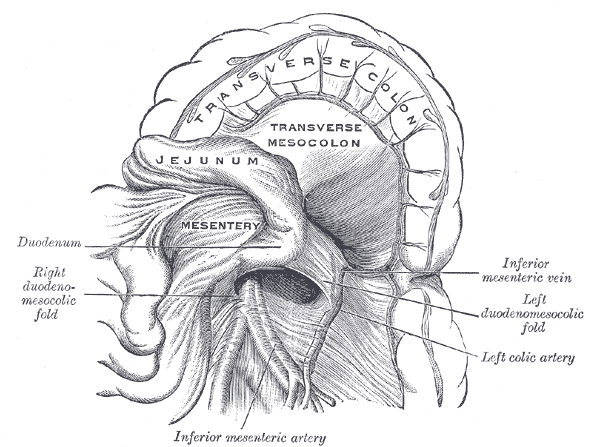
Duodenojejunal fossa.

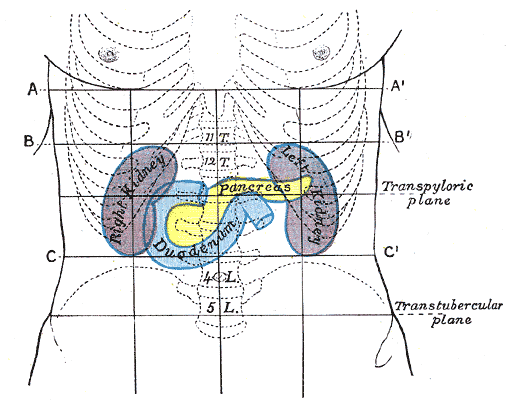
Front of abdomen, showing surface markings for duodenum, pancreas, and kidneys.

== See also ==
- Duodenum
- Transpyloric plane
