= Colostomy reversal =

Colostomy reversal, colostomy takedown
- Other names: Colostomy takedown
- ICD-9-CM: 46.52

A colostomy reversal, also known as a colostomy takedown, is a reversal of the colostomy process by which the colon is reattached by anastomosis to the rectum or anus, providing for the reestablishment of flow of waste through the gastrointestinal tract.

Indications for the surgery include patient pain or discomfort caused by the colostomy, frequent skin breakdown or infection, and herniation at the colostomy site. The technical aspects of the surgery depend on the amount of remaining colon and rectum. Purse-string skin closure, compared with conventional linear skin closure, has been shown to reduce the risk of surgical site infection in people undergoing stoma reversal, and may improve patient satisfaction, although differences in incisional hernia and operative time remain uncertain.

== See also ==
- Colostomy
- General Surgery
