= Toldt's fascia =

Layer of connective tissue in the abdomen

Toldt's fascia, is a discrete layer of connective tissue containing lymphatic channels. It is found between the two mesothelial layers that separate the mesocolon from the underlying retroperitoneum. It was first described by the Austrian anatomist Carl Toldt (1840–1920) as a fascial plane formed by the fusion of the visceral peritoneum with the parietal peritoneum. This was later called Toldt's fascia.
