= Presacral fascia =

Connective tissue lining the sacrum

Details
- Synonyms: posterior part of pelvic parietal fascia

Identifiers
- Latin: fascia presacralis
- TA98: A04.5.03.018
- TA2: 2441
- FMA: 76764

The presacral fascia lines the anterior aspect of the sacrum, enclosing the sacral vessels and nerves. It continues anteriorly as the pelvic parietal fascia, covering the entire pelvic cavity.

The presacral fascia is limited postero-inferiorly, as it fuses with the mesorectal fascia, lying above the levator ani muscle, at the level of the anorectal junction. These two fascias have been erroneously confused, though they are in fact, separate anatomical entities. The colloquial term, among colo-rectal surgeons, for this inter-fascial plane, is known as the holy plane of dissection, coined by Bill Heald. During rectal surgery and mesorectum excision, dissection along the avascular alveolar plane between these two fascias, facilitates a straightforward dissection and preserves the sacral vessels and hypogastric nerves.

Waldeyer's fascia (a.k.a. rectosacral fascia) originates from the presacral parietal fascia at the S2 to S4 level fusing with the rectal visceral fascia at the posterior aspect of the rectum. Waldeyer's fascia divides the retrorectal space into a superior and inferior compartments.

Identification and preservation of the presacral fascia is of fundamental importance in preventing complications and reducing local recurrences of rectal cancer. Hence attention to this anatomy is essential in contemporary rectal surgery.

== History ==
The mesorectal fascia, also known as the fascia propria or the pelvic visceral fascia, has been originally described as the fascia recti in Waldeyer's publication, Das Becken. Fascia recti is also a term commonly used among French surgeons to describe the mesorectal fascia. Confusingly, fascia recti is described in some anatomy books, referring to the fascia of the rectus abdominis muscle.
