= Mesentery =

Contiguous fold of tissues that supports the intestines

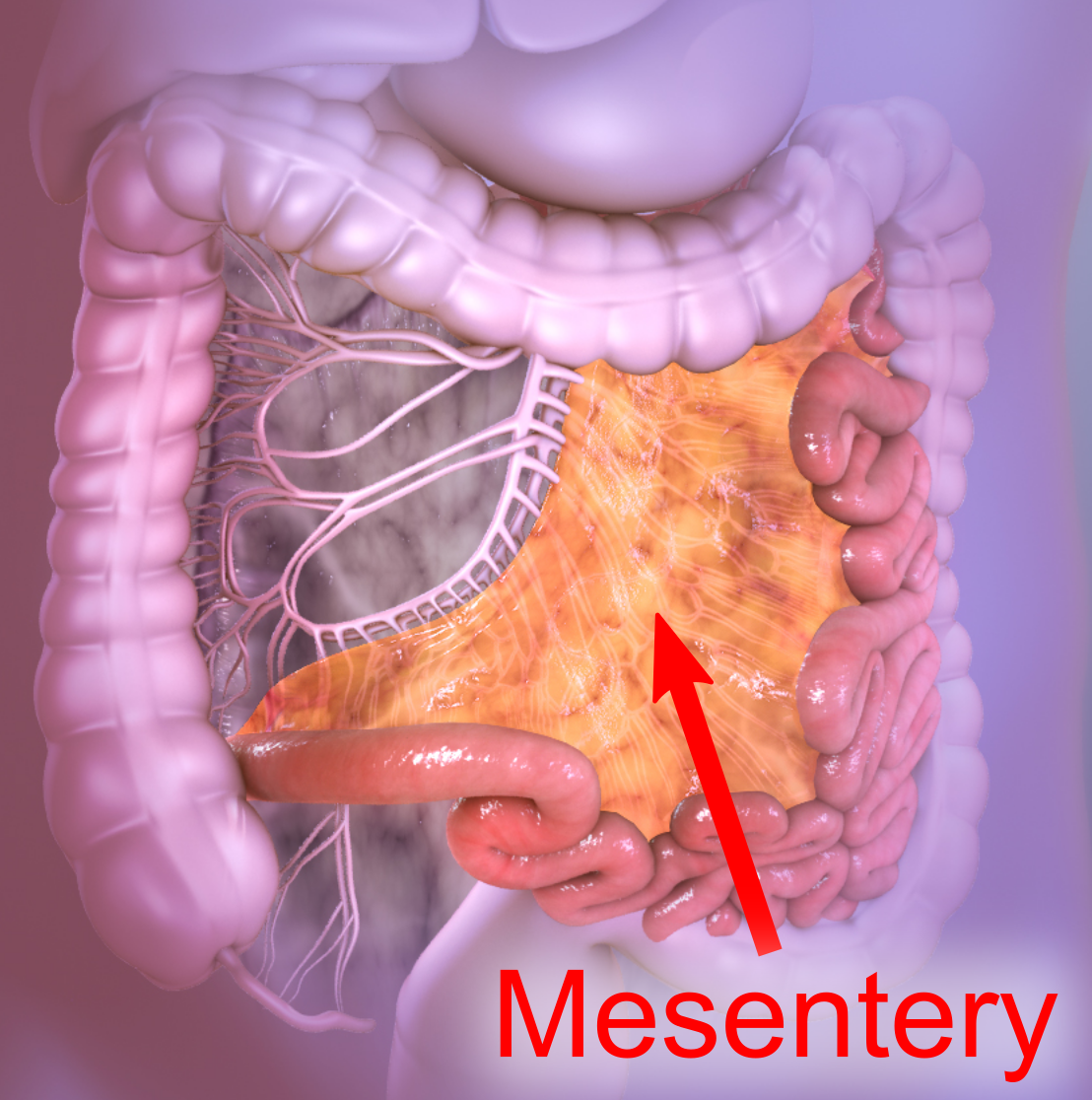
- Mesentery extending from the duodenojejunal flexure to the ileocecal junction

Details
- Pronunciation: /ˈmɛzənˌtɛri/
- System: Human digestive system

Identifiers
- Latin: mesenterium
- MeSH: D008643
- TA98: A10.1.02.007
- TA2: 3740
- FMA: 7144

In human anatomy, the mesentery is an organ that attaches the intestines to the posterior abdominal wall, consisting of a double fold of the peritoneum. It helps (among other functions) in storing fat and allowing blood vessels, lymphatics, and nerves to supply the intestines.

The mesocolon (the part of the mesentery that attaches the colon to the abdominal wall) was formerly thought to be a fragmented structure, with all named parts—the ascending, transverse, descending, and sigmoid mesocolons, the mesoappendix, and the mesorectum—separately terminating their insertion into the posterior abdominal wall. However, in 1925, new microscopic and electron microscopic examinations showed the mesocolon to be a single structure derived from the duodenojejunal flexure and extending to the distal mesorectal layer. Thus the mesentery is an internal organ.

Now known as a continuous organ, the mesentery can be divided into two sections, a mesenteric region or domain containing the abdominal digestive components, and a nonmesenteric region containing the urogenital system, musculoskeletal system, and the great vessels.

== Structure ==
Now known as a continuous organ the mesentery can be divided into two sections, a mesenteric region or domain containing the abdominal digestive components, and a nonmesenteric region containing the urogenital system, musculoskeletal system, and the great vessels. This recognises that the mesenteric digestive organs are all linked.

The mesentery of the small intestine arises from the root of the mesentery (or mesenteric root) and is the part connected with the structures in front of the vertebral column. The root is narrow, about 15 cm long, 20 cm in width, and is directed obliquely from the duodenojejunal flexure at the left side of the second lumbar vertebra to the right sacroiliac joint. The root of the mesentery extends from the duodenojejunal flexure to the ileocaecal junction. This section of the small intestine is located centrally in the abdominal cavity and lies behind the transverse colon and the greater omentum.

The mesentery becomes attached to the colon at the gastrointestinal margin and continues as the several regions of the mesocolon. The parts of the mesocolon take their names from the part of the colon to which they attach. These are the transverse mesocolon attaching to the transverse colon, the sigmoid mesocolon attaching to the sigmoid colon, the mesoappendix attaching to the appendix, and the mesorectum attaching to the upper third of the rectum.

The mesocolon regions were traditionally taught to be separate sections with separate insertions into the posterior abdominal wall. In 2012, the first detailed observational and histological studies of the mesocolon were undertaken and this revealed several new findings. The study included 109 patients undergoing open, elective, total abdominal colectomy. Anatomical observations were recorded during the surgery and on the post-operative specimens.

These studies showed that the mesocolon is continuous from the ileocaecal to the rectosigmoid level. It was also shown that a mesenteric confluence occurs at the ileocaecal and rectosigmoid junctions, as well as at the hepatic and splenic flexures and that each confluence involves peritoneal and omental attachments. The proximal rectum was shown to originate at the confluence of the mesorectum and mesosigmoid. A plane occupied by perinephric fascia was shown to separate the entire apposed small intestinal mesentery and the mesocolon from the retroperitoneum. Deep in the pelvis, this fascia coalesces to give rise to presacral fascia.

=== Flexural anatomy ===
Flexural anatomy is frequently described as a difficult area. It is simplified when each flexure is considered as being centered on a mesenteric contiguity. The ileocaecal flexure arises at the point where the ileum is continuous with the caecum around the ileocaecal mesenteric flexure. Similarly, the hepatic flexure is formed between the right mesocolon and transverse mesocolon at the mesenteric confluence. The colonic component of the hepatic flexure is draped around this mesenteric confluence. Furthermore, the splenic flexure is formed by the mesenteric confluence between the transverse and left mesocolon. The colonic component of the splenic flexure occurs lateral to the mesenteric confluence. At every flexure, a continuous peritoneal fold lies outside the colonic/mesocolic complex tethering this to the posterior abdominal wall.

=== Mesocolon regions ===
The transverse mesocolon is that section of the mesentery attached to the transverse colon that lies between the colic flexures.

The sigmoid mesocolon is that region of the mesentery to which the sigmoid colon is attached at the gastrointestinal mesenteric margin.

The mesoappendix is the portion of the mesentery connecting the ileum to the appendix. It may extend to the tip of the appendix. It encloses the appendicular artery and vein, as well as lymphatic vessels, nerves, and often a lymph node.

The mesorectum is that part attached to the upper third of the rectum.

=== Peritoneal folds ===
Understanding the macroscopic structure of the mesenteric organ meant that associated structures—the peritoneal folds and congenital and omental adhesions—could be better appraised. The small intestinal mesenteric fold occurs where the small intestinal mesentery folds onto the posterior abdominal wall and continues laterally as the right mesocolon. During mobilization of the small intestinal mesentery from the posterior abdominal wall, this fold is incised, allowing access to the interface between the small intestinal mesentery and the retroperitoneum. The fold continues at the inferolateral boundary of the ileocaecal junction and turns cephalad as the right paracolic peritoneal fold. This fold is divided during lateral to medial mobilization, permitting the surgeon to serially lift the right colon and associated mesentery off the underlying fascia and retroperitoneum. At the hepatic flexure, the right lateral peritoneal fold turns and continues medially as the hepatocolic peritoneal fold. Division of the fold in this location permits separation of the colonic component of the hepatic flexure and mesocolon off the retroperitoneum.

Interposed between the hepatic and splenic flexures, the greater omentum adheres to the transverse colon along a further band or fold of peritoneum. Dissection through this allows access to the cephalad (top) surface of the transverse mesocolon. Focal adhesions frequently tether the greater omentum to the cephalad aspect of the transverse mesocolon. The left colon is associated with a similar anatomic configuration of peritoneal folds; the splenic peritoneal fold is contiguous with the left lateral paracolic peritoneal fold at the splenic flexure. Division of the latter similarly allows for the separation of the left colon and associated mesentery off the underlying fascia and frees it from the retroperitoneum. The left lateral paracolic peritoneal fold continues distally at the lateral aspect of the mobile component of the mesosigmoid.

=== Microanatomy ===
Determination of the macroscopic structure of the mesenteric organ allowed a recent characterisation of the histological and electron microscopic properties. The microscopic structure of the mesocolon and associated fascia is consistent from ileocecal to mesorectal levels. A surface mesothelium and underlying connective tissue is universally apparent. Adipocytes lobules within the body of the mesocolon are separated by fibrous septa arising from submesothelial connective tissue. Where apposed to the retroperitoneum, two mesothelial layers separate the mesocolon and underlying retroperitoneum. Between these is Toldt's fascia, a discrete layer of connective tissue. Lymphatic channels are evident in mesocolic connective tissue and in Toldt's fascia.

=== Development ===
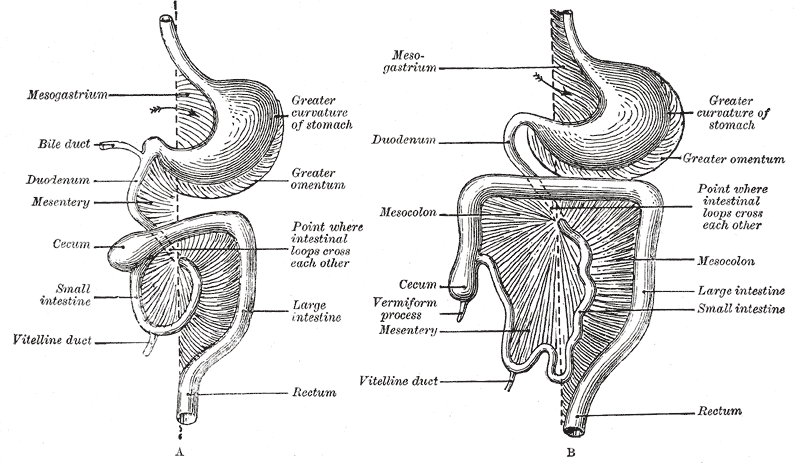
Two of the stages in the development of the digestive tube and its mesentery

==== Dorsal mesentery ====
Mesentery in red. Dorsal mesentery is the lower part of the circuit. The upper part is ventral mesentery.

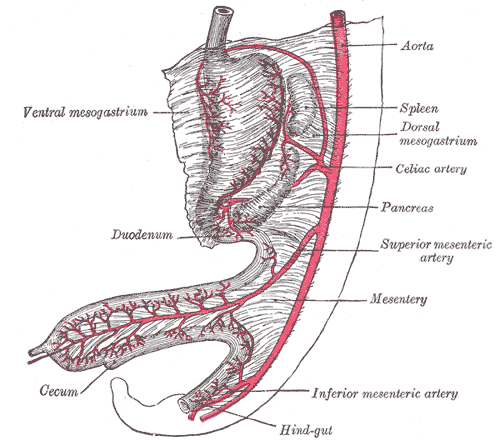
Abdominal part of digestive tube and its attachment to the primitive or common mesentery. Human embryo of six weeks.

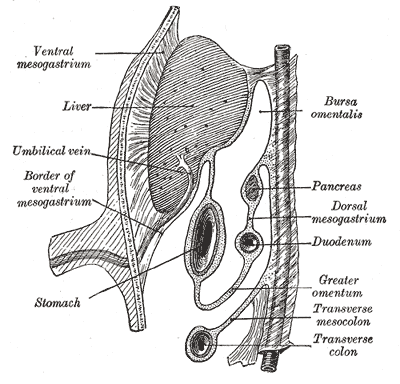
Schematic figure of the bursa omentalis, etc. Human embryo of eight weeks.

The primitive gut is suspended from the posterior abdominal wall by the dorsal mesentery. The gastrointestinal tract and associated dorsal mesentery are subdivided into foregut, midgut, and hindgut regions based on the respective blood supply. The foregut is supplied by the celiac trunk, the midgut is supplied by the superior mesenteric artery (SMA), and the hindgut is supplied by the inferior mesenteric artery (IMA). This division is established by the fourth week of development. After this, the midgut undergoes a period of rapid elongation, forcing it to herniate through the navel. During herniation, the midgut rotates 90° anti-clockwise around the axis of the SMA and forms the midgut loop. The cranial portion of the loop moves to the right and the caudal portion of the loop moves toward the left. This rotation occurs at about the eighth week of development. The cranial portion of the loop will develop into the jejunum and most of the ileum, while the caudal part of the loop eventually forms the terminal portion of the ileum, the ascending colon and the initial two-thirds of the transverse colon. As the foetus grows larger, the mid-gut loop is drawn back through the umbilicus and undergoes a further 180° rotation, completing a total of 270° rotation. At this point, about 10 weeks, the caecum lies close to the liver. From here it moves in a cranial to caudal direction to eventually lie in the lower right portion of the abdominal cavity. This process brings the ascending colon to lie vertically in the lateral right portion of the abdominal cavity apposed to the posterior abdominal wall. The descending colon occupies a similar position on the left side.

During these topographic changes, the dorsal mesentery undergoes corresponding changes. Most anatomical and embryological textbooks say that after adopting a final position, the ascending and descending mesocolons disappear during embryogenesis. Embryology—An Illustrated Colour Text, "most of the mid-gut retains the original dorsal mesentery, though parts of the duodenum derived from the mid-gut do not. The mesentery associated with the ascending colon and descending colon is resorbed, bringing these parts of the colon into close contact with the body wall." In The Developing Human, the author states, "the mesentery of the ascending colon fuses with the parietal peritoneum on this wall and disappears; consequently the ascending colon also becomes retroperitoneal". To reconcile these differences, several theories of embryologic mesenteric development—including the "regression" and "sliding" theories—have been proposed, but none has been widely accepted.

The portion of the dorsal mesentery that attaches to the greater curvature of the stomach, is known as the dorsal mesogastrium. The part of the dorsal mesentery that suspends the colon is termed the mesocolon. The dorsal mesogastrium develops into the greater omentum.

==== Ventral mesentery ====
The development of the septum transversum takes part in the formation of the diaphragm, while the caudal portion into which the liver grows forms the ventral mesentery. The part of the ventral mesentery that attaches to the stomach is known as the ventral mesogastrium.

The lesser omentum is formed, by a thinning of the mesoderm or ventral mesogastrium, which attaches the stomach and duodenum to the anterior abdominal wall. By the subsequent growth of the liver, this leaf of mesoderm is divided into two parts – the lesser omentum between the stomach and liver, and the falciform and coronary ligaments between the liver and the abdominal wall and diaphragm.

In the adult, the ventral mesentery is the part of the peritoneum closest to the navel.

== Clinical significance ==
Clarifications of the mesenteric anatomy have facilitated a clearer understanding of diseases involving the mesentery, examples of which include malrotation and Crohn's disease (CD). In CD, the mesentery is frequently thickened, rendering hemostasis challenging. In addition, fat wrapping—creeping fat—involves extension of mesenteric fat over the circumference of contiguous gastrointestinal tract, and this may indicate increased mesothelial plasticity. The relationship between mesenteric derangements and mucosal manifestations in CD points to a pathobiological overlap; some authors say that CD is mainly a mesenteric disorder that secondarily affects the GI tract and systemic circulation.

Thrombosis of the superior mesenteric vein can cause mesenteric ischemia also known as ischemic bowel. Mesenteric ischemia can also result from the formation of a volvulus, a twisted loop of the small intestine that when it wraps around itself and also encloses the mesentery too tightly can cause ischemia.

The rationalization of mesenteric and peritoneal fold anatomy permits the surgeon to differentiate both from intraperitoneal adhesions—also called congenital adhesions. These are highly variable among patients and occur in several locations. Congenital adhesions occur between the lateral aspect of the peritoneum overlying the mobile component of the mesosigmoid and the parietal peritoneum in the left iliac fossa. During the lateral to the medial approach of mobilizing of the mesosigmoid, these must be divided first before the peritoneum proper can be accessed. Similarly, focal adhesions occur between the undersurface of the greater omentum and the cephalad aspect of the transverse mesocolon. These can be accessed after dividing the peritoneal fold that links the greater omentum and transverse colon. Adhesions here must be divided to separate the greater omentum off the transverse mesocolon, thus allowing access to the lesser sac proper.

The fetal sigmoid colon mesentery can be visualised during routine ultrasound examination from the 12th week of pregnancy.

=== Surgery ===
While the total mesorectal excision (TME) operation has become the surgical gold standard for the management of rectal cancer, this is not so for colon cancer. Recently, the surgical principles underpinning TME in rectal cancer have been extrapolated to colonic surgery. Total or complete mesocolic excision (CME), use planar surgery and extensive mesenterectomy (high tie) to minimise breach of the mesentery and maximise lymph nodes yield. Application of this T/CME reduces local five-year recurrence rates in colon cancer from 6.5% to 3.6%, while cancer-related five-year survival rates in patients resected for cure increased from 82.1% to 89.1%.

=== Radiology ===
Recent radiologic appraisals of the mesenteric organ have been conducted in the context of the contemporary understanding of mesenteric organ anatomy. When this organ is divided into non-flexural and flexural regions, these can readily be differentiated in most patients on CT imaging. Clarification of the radiological appearance of the human mesentery resonates with the suggestions of Dodds and enables a clearer conceptualization of mesenteric derangements in disease states. This is of immediate relevance in the spread of cancer from colon cancer and perforated diverticular disease, and in pancreatitis where fluid collections in the lesser sac dissect the mesocolon from the retroperitoneum and thereby extend distally within the latter.

== History ==
The mesentery has been known for thousands of years, however it was unclear whether the mesentery is a single organ, or whether there are several mesenteries. The classical anatomical description of the mesocolon is credited to British surgeon Sir Frederick Treves in 1885, although a description of the membrane as a single structure dates back to at least Leonardo da Vinci. Treves is known for performing the first appendectomy in England in 1888; he was surgeon to both Queen Victoria and King Edward VII. He studied the human mesentery and peritoneal folds in 100 cadavers and described the right and left mesocolons as vestigial or absent in the human adult. Accordingly, the small intestinal mesentery, transverse, and sigmoid mesocolons all terminated or attached at their insertions into the posterior abdominal wall. These assertions were included in mainstream surgical, anatomical, embryological, and radiologic literature for more than a century.

Almost 10 years before Treves, the Austrian anatomist Carl Toldt described the persistence of all portions of the mesocolon into adulthood. Toldt was professor of anatomy in Prague and Vienna; he published his account of the human mesentery in 1879. Toldt identified a fascial plane between the mesocolon and the underlying retroperitoneum, formed by the fusion of the visceral peritoneum of the mesocolon with the parietal peritoneum of the retroperitoneum; this later became known as Toldt's fascia.

In 1942, anatomist Edward Congdon also demonstrated that the right and left mesocolons persisted into adulthood and remained separate from the retroperitoneum—extraretroperitoneal. Radiologist Wylie J. Dodds described this concept in 1986. Dodds extrapolated that unless the mesocolon remained an extraretroperitoneal structure—separate from the retroperitoneum—only then would the radiologic appearance of the mesentery and peritoneal folds be reconciled with actual anatomy.

Descriptions of the mesocolon by Toldt, Congdon, and Dodds have largely been ignored in mainstream literature until recently. A formal appraisal of the mesenteric organ anatomy was conducted in 2012; it echoed the findings of Toldt, Congdon, and Dodds. The single greatest advance in this regard was the identification of the mesenteric organ as being contiguous, as it spans the gastrointestinal tract from duodenojejunal flexure to mesorectal level.

In 2012 it was discovered that the mesentery was a single organ, which precipitated advancement in colon and rectum surgery and in sciences related to anatomy and development.

=== Etymology ===
The word "mesentery" and its Neo-Latin equivalent mesenterium (/ˌmɛzənˈtɛriəm/) use the combining forms mes- + enteron, ultimately from ancient Greek μεσέντερον (mesenteron), from μέσος (mésos, "middle") + ἔντερον (énteron, "gut"), yielding "mid-intestine" or "midgut". The adjectival form is "mesenteric" (/ˌmɛzənˈtɛrɪk/).

=== Lymphangiology ===
An improved understanding of mesenteric structure and histology has enabled a formal characterization of mesenteric lymphangiology. Stereologic assessments of the lymphatic vessels demonstrate a rich lymphatic network embedded within the mesenteric connective tissue lattice. On average, vessels occur every 0.14 mm (0.0055 in), and within 0.1 mm (0.0039 in) from the mesocolic surfaces—anterior and posterior. Lymphatic channels have also been identified in Toldt's fascia, though the significance of this is unknown.

== See also ==
- Mesorchium
- Mesovarium
- Blood vessels: The superior mesenteric artery and the inferior mesenteric artery (the two main mesenteric arteries), and the superior mesenteric vein and the inferior mesenteric vein (the two main mesenteric veins), plus their branches and the capillaries

== Additional images ==
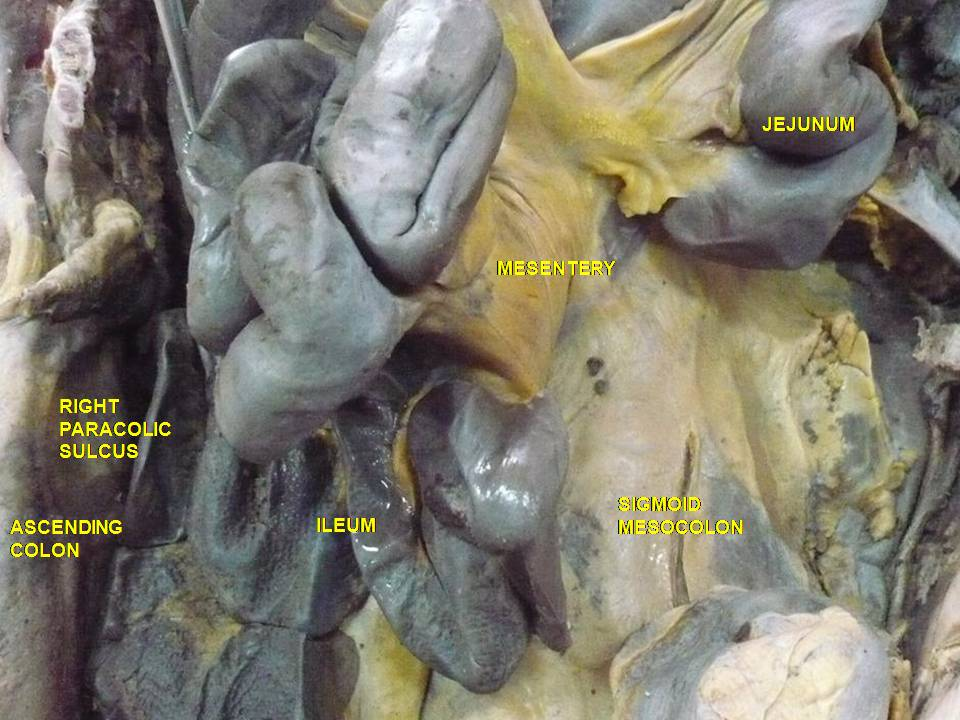
Mesenteric relation of intestines. Deep dissection. Anterior view.
