= Hořovice Uplands =

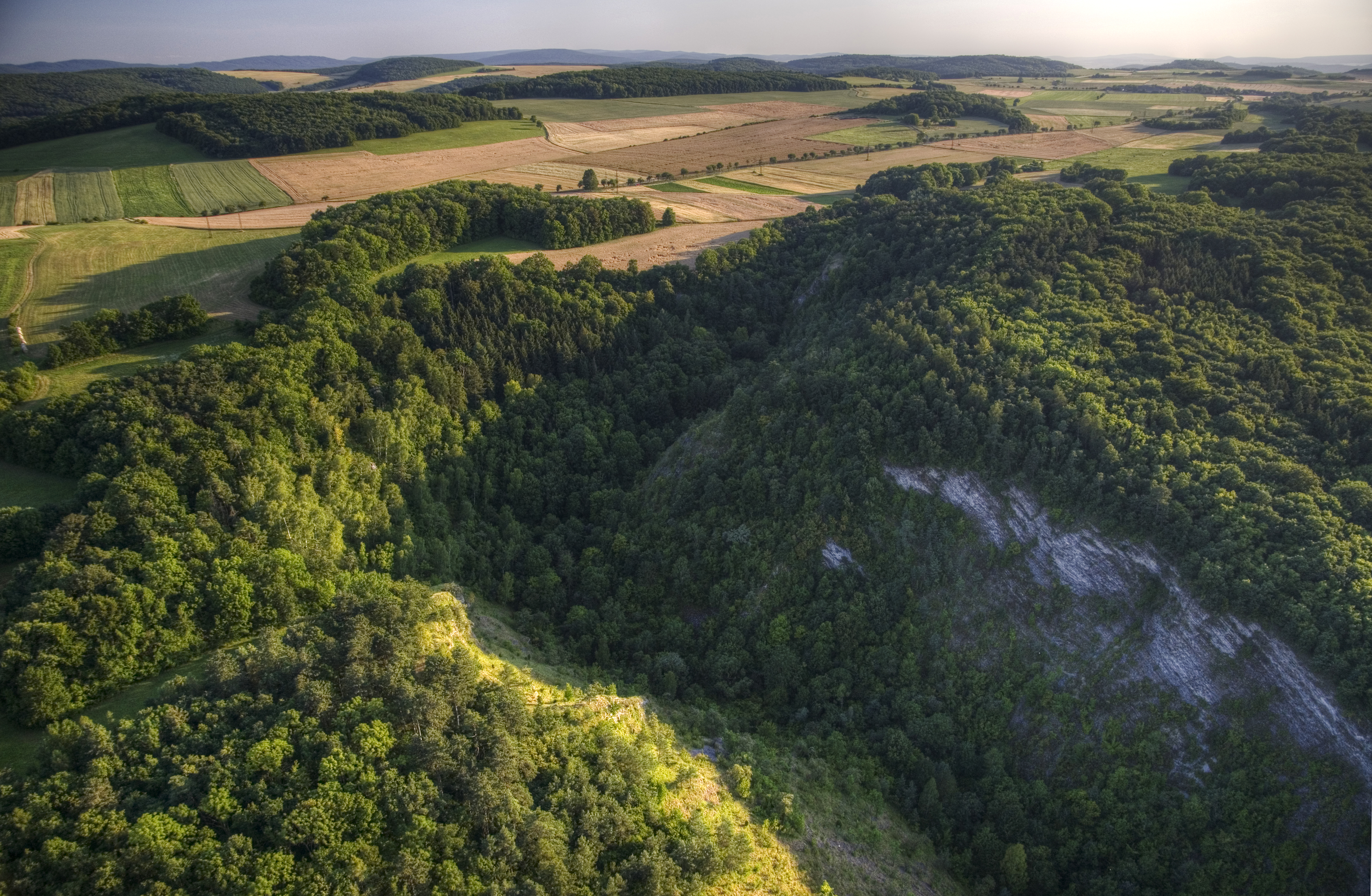
- Koda National Nature Reserve in Tetín

Highest point
- Peak: Bacín
- Elevation: 499 m (1,637 ft)

Dimensions
- Length: 57 km (35 mi)
- Area: 427 km^{2} (165 mi^{2})

Geography
- Hořovice Uplands in the geomorphological system of the Czech Republic
- Country: Czech Republic
- Regions: Central Bohemian, Plzeň, Prague
- Range coordinates: 49°53′N 14°4′E
- Parent range: Brdy Macroregion

Geology
- Rock type(s): Shale, limestone

The Hořovice Uplands (Czech: Hořovická pahorkatina) are uplands and a geomorphological mesoregion of the Czech Republic. The mesoregion is located mostly in the Central Bohemian Region, but it also extends into the Plzeň Region and into the area of Prague. It is named after the town of Hořovice.

== Geomorphology ==
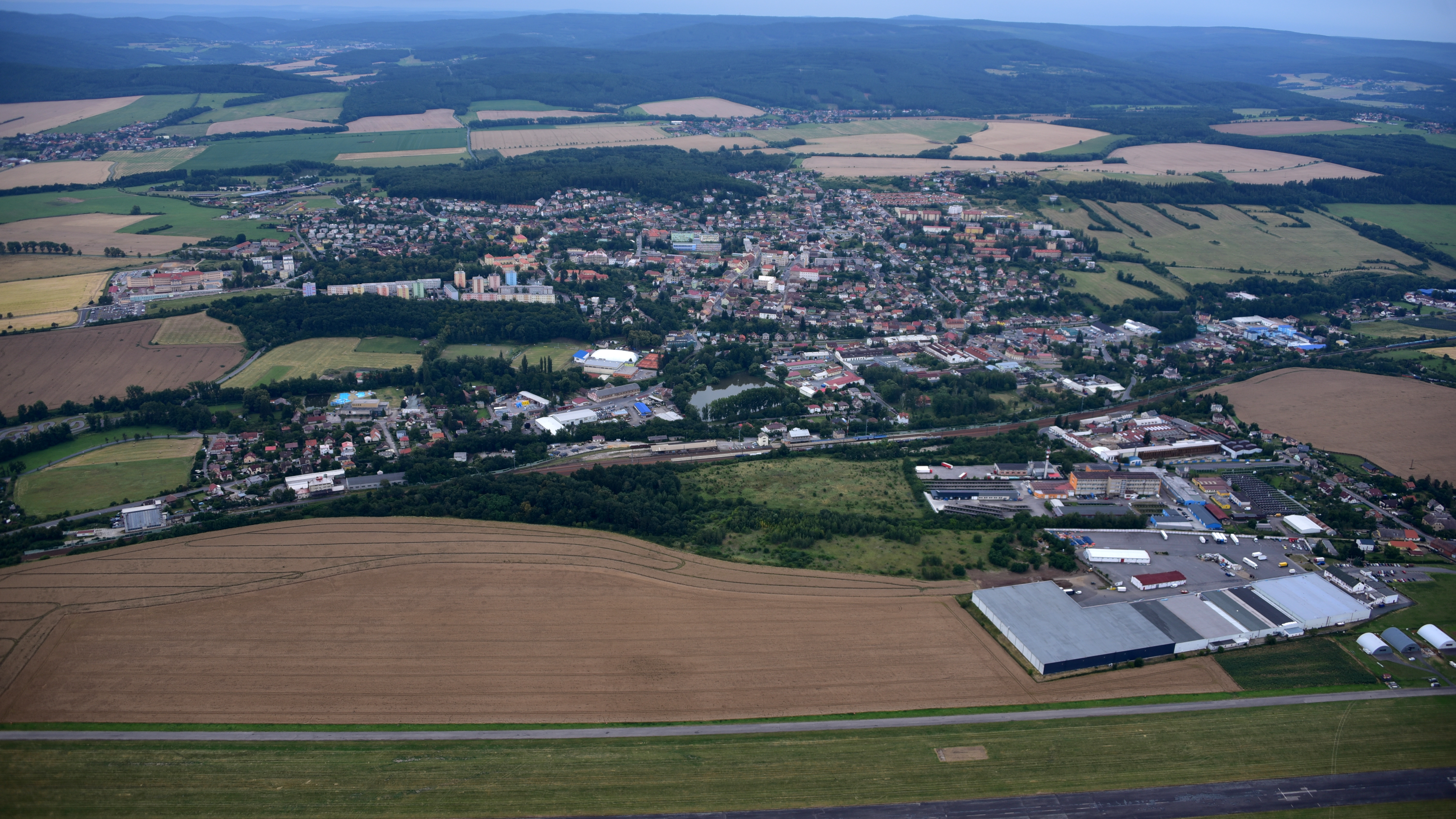
Western part of the Hořovice Uplands with the town of Hořovice

The Hořovice Uplands are a mesoregion of the Brdy Macroregion within the Bohemian Massif. The landscape is characterised by a structural-denudational relief, which formed due to the varying resistance of the rocks. The Berounka River has carved a deep, canyon-like valley. Numerous karst features have formed on the limestone bedrock. The uplands area further subdivided into the microregions of Karlštejn Highlands and Hořovice Furrow.

There are many medium-sized hills. The highest peaks of the Hořovice Uplands are:

- Bacín, 499 m (1,637 ft)
- Lejškov, 487 m (1,598 ft)
- Šamor, 481 m (1,578 ft)
- Zlatý kůň, 475 m (1,558 ft)
- Újezdce, 474 m (1,555 ft)
- Vysoká skála, 472 m (1,549 ft)
- Koukolova hora, 471 m (1,545 ft)
- Mramor, 470 m (1,542 ft)
- Tobolský vrch, 467 m (1,532 ft)
- Housina, 461 m (1,512 ft)

== Geography ==
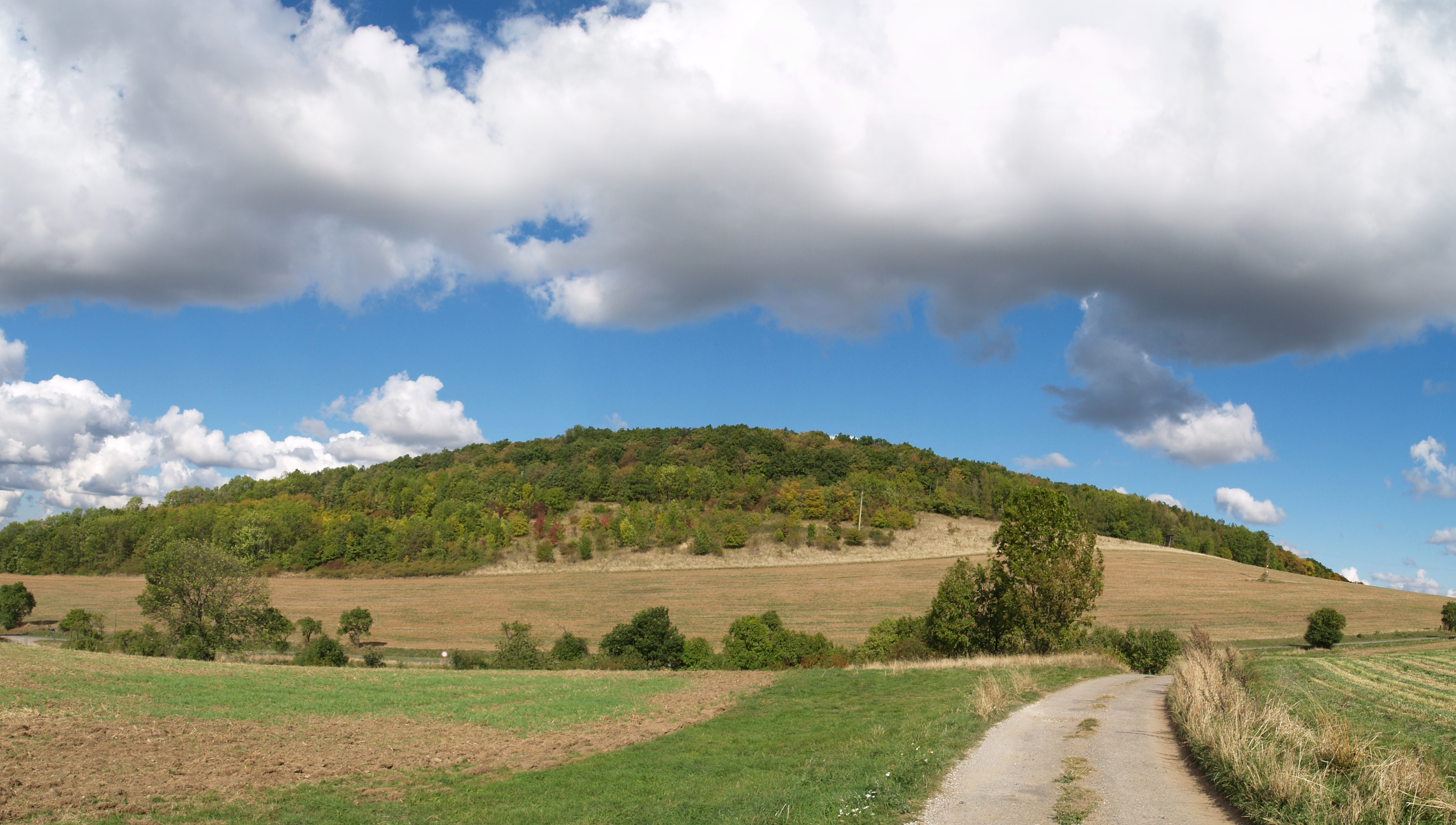
Bacín, the highest peak

The territory roughly stretches from the southwest to the northeast, and is very narrow in its western and eastern parts. The uplands has an area of 427 square kilometres (165 sq mi) and an average elevation of 353 metres (1,158 ft).

The main rivers in the uplands is the Berounka, which flows through the eastern part of the area, and the Litavka, which flows through the central and northern parts of the area, until it joins the Berounka. In the eastermost part of the uplands, the Berounka flows into the Vltava. In the western tip of the Hořovice Uplands is a system of fishponds, supplied by the stream Holoubkovský potok (a tributary of the Klabava) and its tributaries.

The most populous town that entirely lies in the Hořovice Uplands are Hořovice and Hostomice. Most of the towns of Beroun, Králův Dvůr, Černošice, Dobřichovice and Řevnice also lies in the territory of the uplands. The city of Prague extends into the uplands with its southwestern edge (Lahovice, Zbraslav and Lipence).

== Geology ==
The geological bedrock consists of Paleozoic shale and limestone. The larger part of the Bohemian Karst Protected Landscape Area lies within the Hořovice Uplands, in its northern part. The protected landscape area includes the Koněprusy Caves and encompasses many isolated karst features.

== Vegetation ==
Except for the Bohemian Karst Protected Landscape, the landscape is sparsely forested and has a predominantly agricultural character.
