= Skřipel =

- Municipality
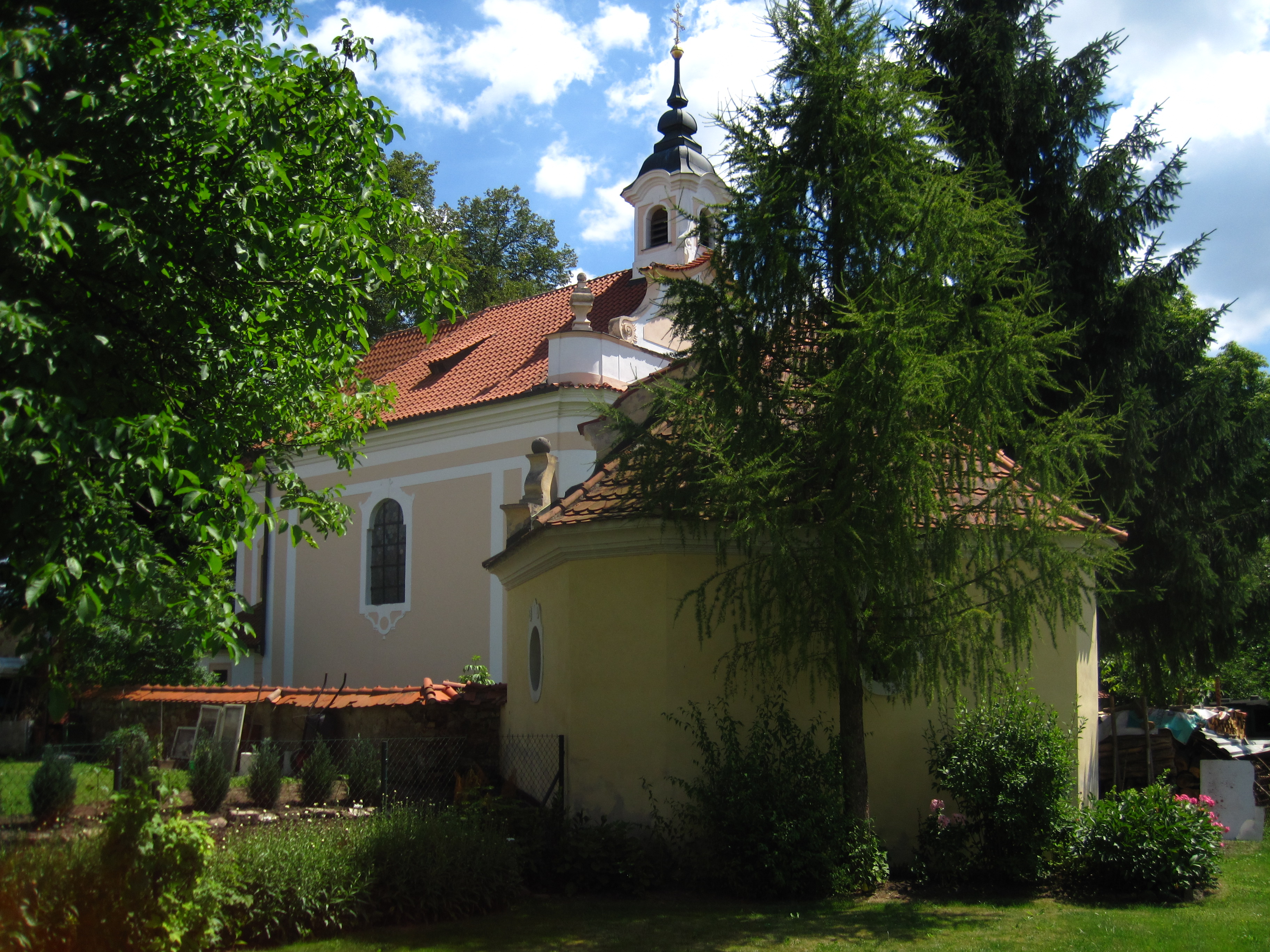
- Church of Saints Simon and Jude

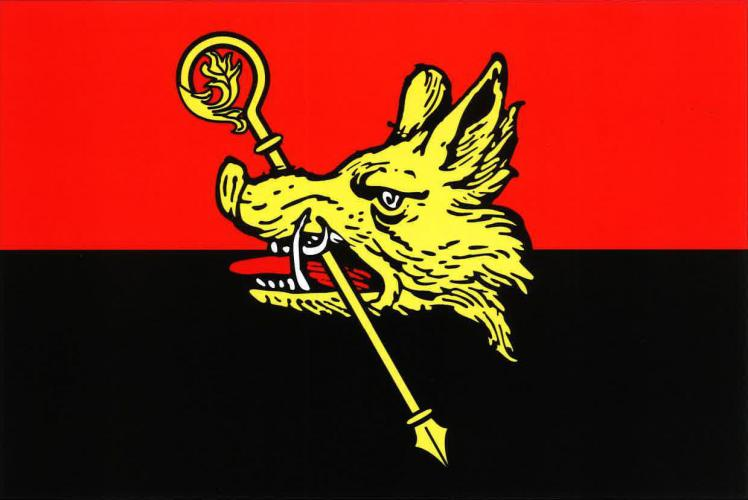
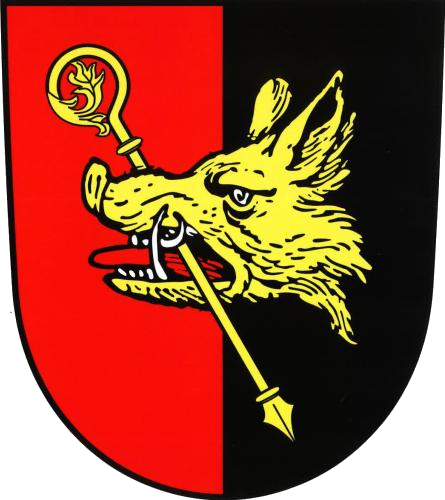
- Flag Coat of arms

- Location in the Czech Republic
- Coordinates: 49°50′31″N 14°4′1″E
- Country: Czech Republic
- Region: Central Bohemian
- District: Beroun
- First mentioned: 1088

Area
  - Total: 3.05 km^{2} (1.18 sq mi)
- Elevation: 350 m (1,150 ft)

Population (2026-01-01)
  - Total: 142
  - Density: 46.6/km^{2} (121/sq mi)
- Time zone: UTC+1 (CET)
  - Summer (DST): UTC+2 (CEST)
- Postal code: 267 24
- Website: www.skripel.cz

Skřipel is a municipality and village in Beroun District in the Central Bohemian Region of the Czech Republic. It has about 100 inhabitants.

== Etymology ==
The name is derived from the personal name Skříp.

== Geography ==
Skřipel is located about 13 kilometres (8 mi) south of Beroun and 33 km (21 mi) southwest of Prague. It lies in an agricultural landscape in the Hořovice Uplands. The highest point is at 389 m (1,276 ft) above sea level. The stream Chlumecký potok flows through the municipality and supplies there several small fishponds.

== History ==
The village allegedly existed in 999, when it was a property of the newly established Ostrov Monastery in Davle. The first trustworthy written mention of Skřipel is from 1232. The village was divided into two parts, one owned by the monastery and one by various noblemen. In 1504, the Wratislaw of Mitrovice family bought both parts of Skřipel. This noble family owned the village until 1677. In 1639, during the Thirty Years' War, the village was badly damaged. From 1677, Skřipel belonged to the Osov estate.

== Demographics ==
Historical population

Year	Pop.	±%
1869	174	—
1880	173	−0.6%
1890	179	+3.5%
1900	180	+0.6%
1910	174	−3.3%

Year	Pop.	±%
1921	163	−6.3%
1930	142	−12.9%
1950	140	−1.4%
1961	122	−12.9%
1970	118	−3.3%

Year	Pop.	±%
1980	148	+25.4%
1991	108	−27.0%
2001	117	+8.3%
2011	117	+0.0%
2021	129	+10.3%

Source: Censuses

== Transport ==
The railway line Lochovice–Zadní Třebaň runs through the southern part of the municipality, but there is no train station.

== Sights ==
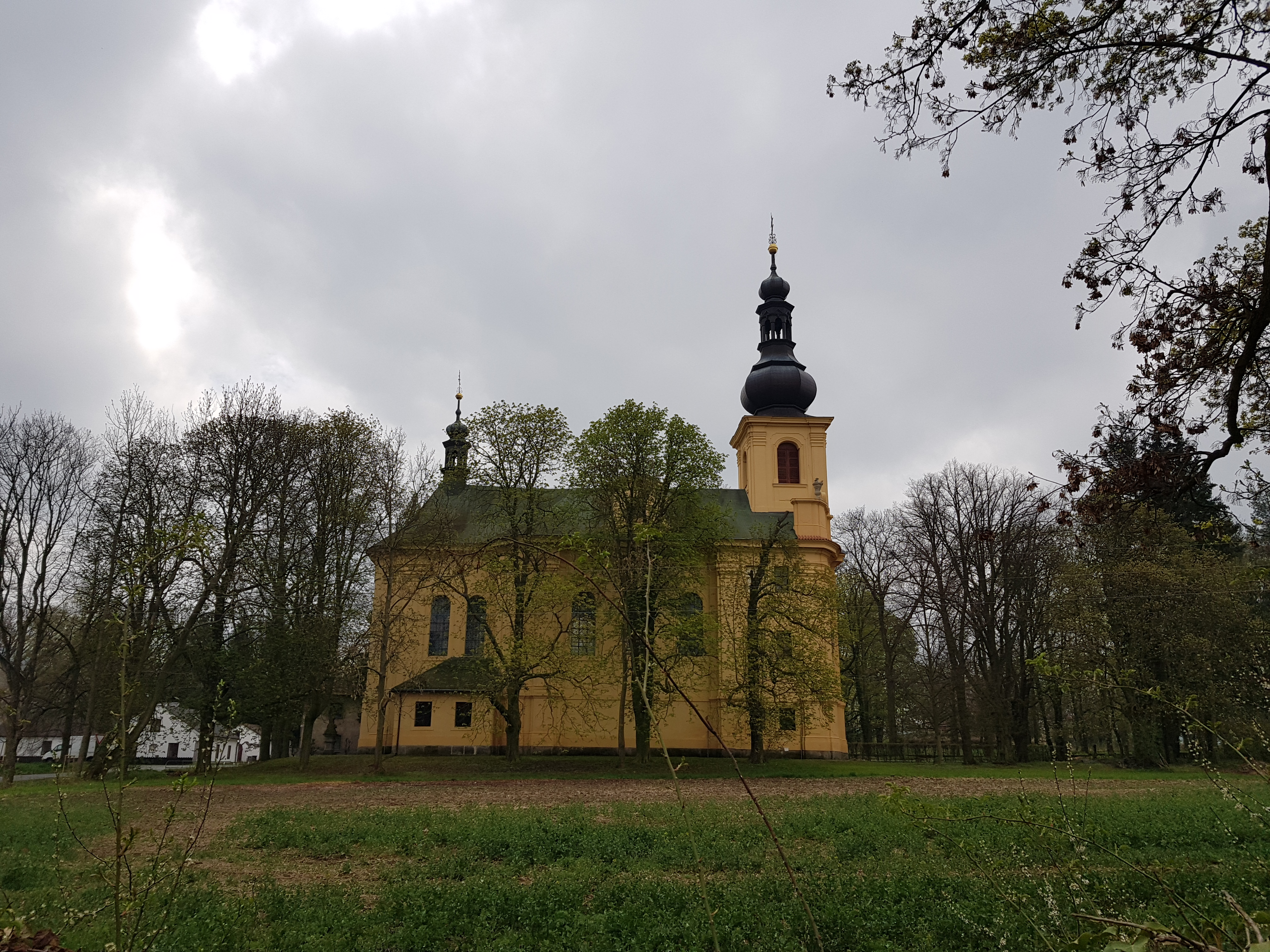
Church of the Nativity of Saint John the Baptist

The main landmark of Skřipel is the Church of Saints Simon and Jude. It was built in the late Baroque style in 1768–1794, on the site of an older church.

In the eastern part of the municipal territory is located the Church of the Nativity of Saint John the Baptist. It was built in the Baroque style in the first half of the 18th century.

The entire municipality lies in a landscape monument zone called Osovsko. It is a regular agricultural landscape around Osov with a net of paths lined with avenues. It was established in two phases after the Thirty Years' War and after 1805.
