= Osov =

Osov may refer to:

- Osov (Beroun District) in Czech Republic
- Osov (Belarus) in Belarus
