= Měňany =

- Municipality
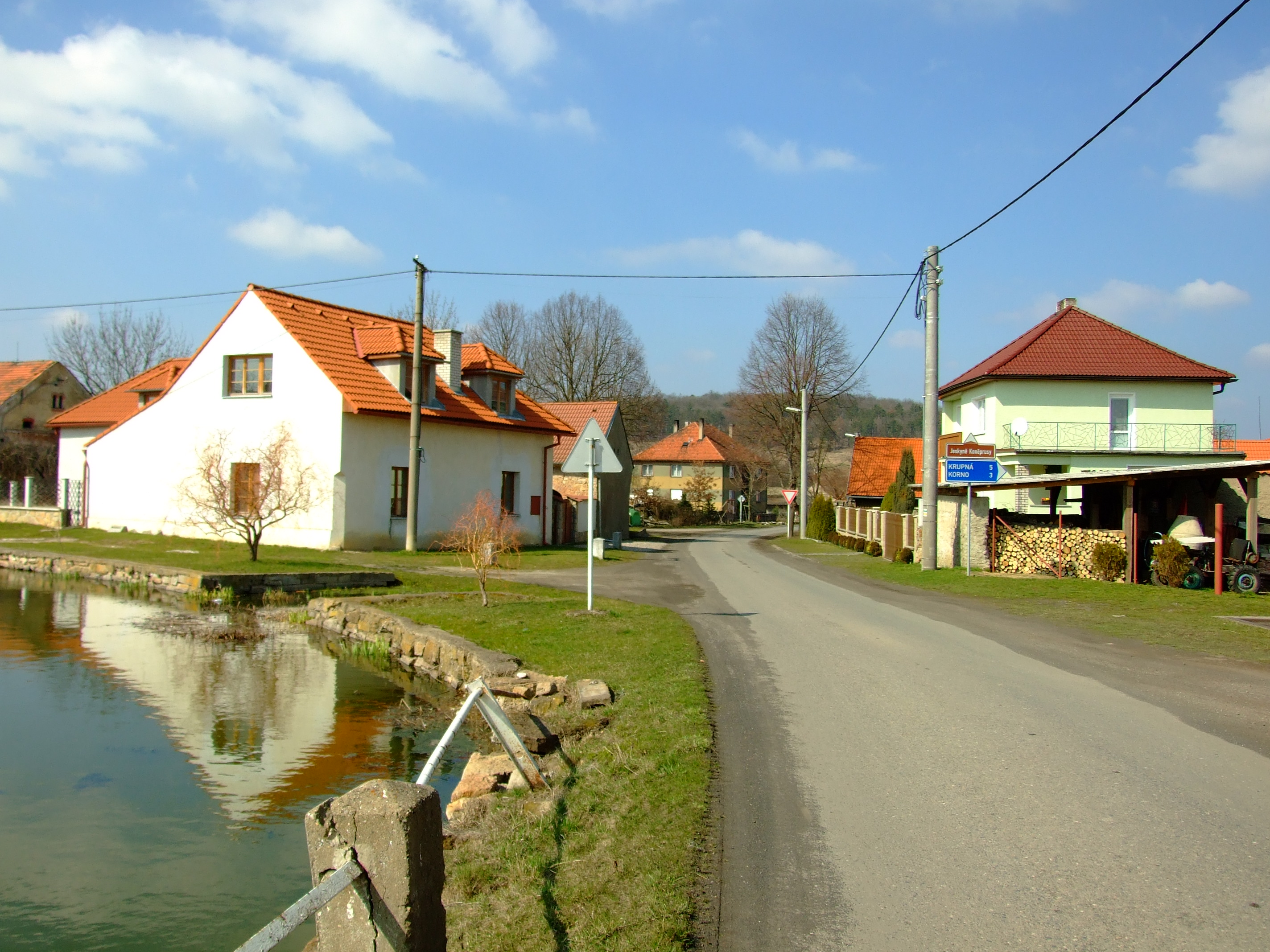
- Road through Měňany

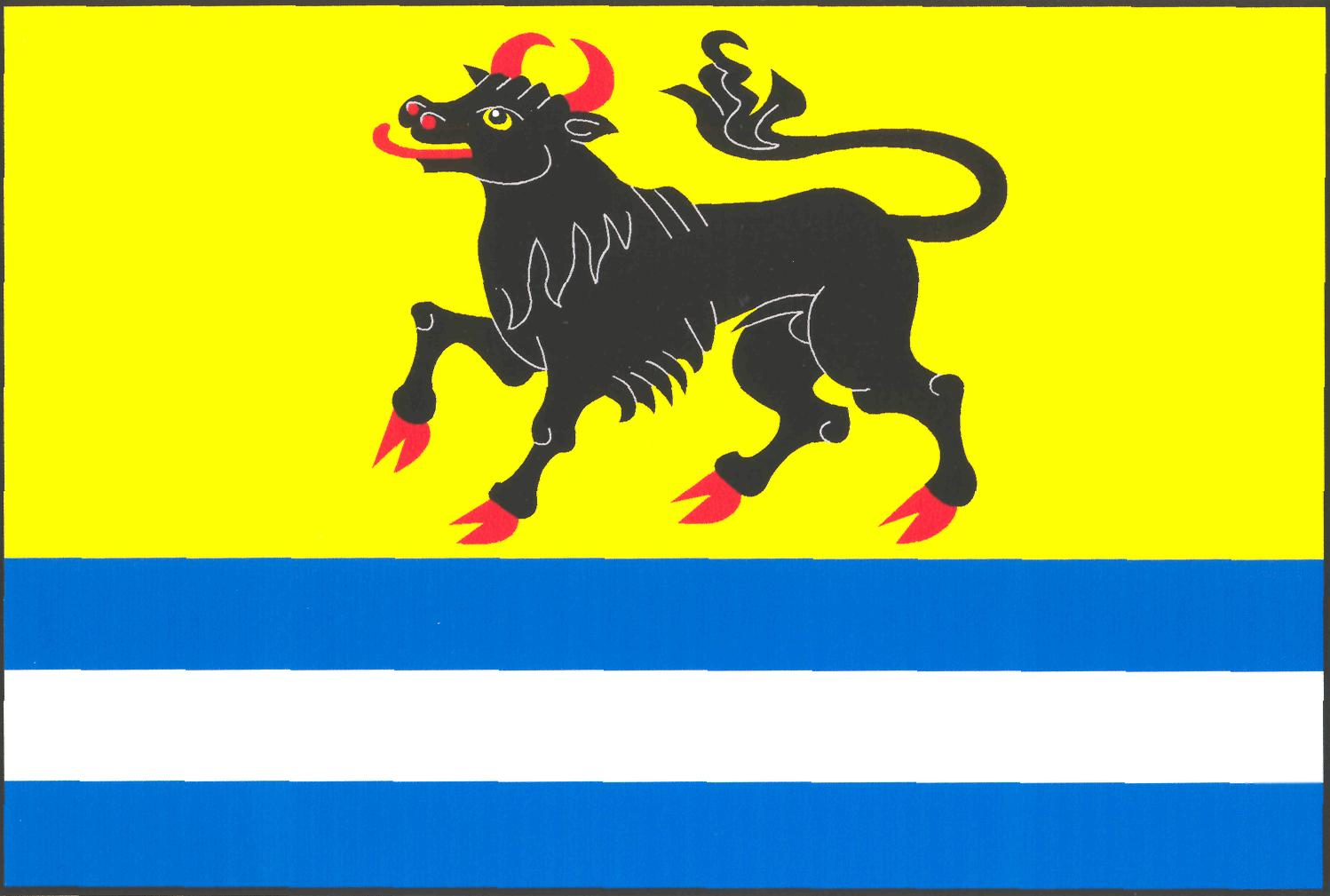
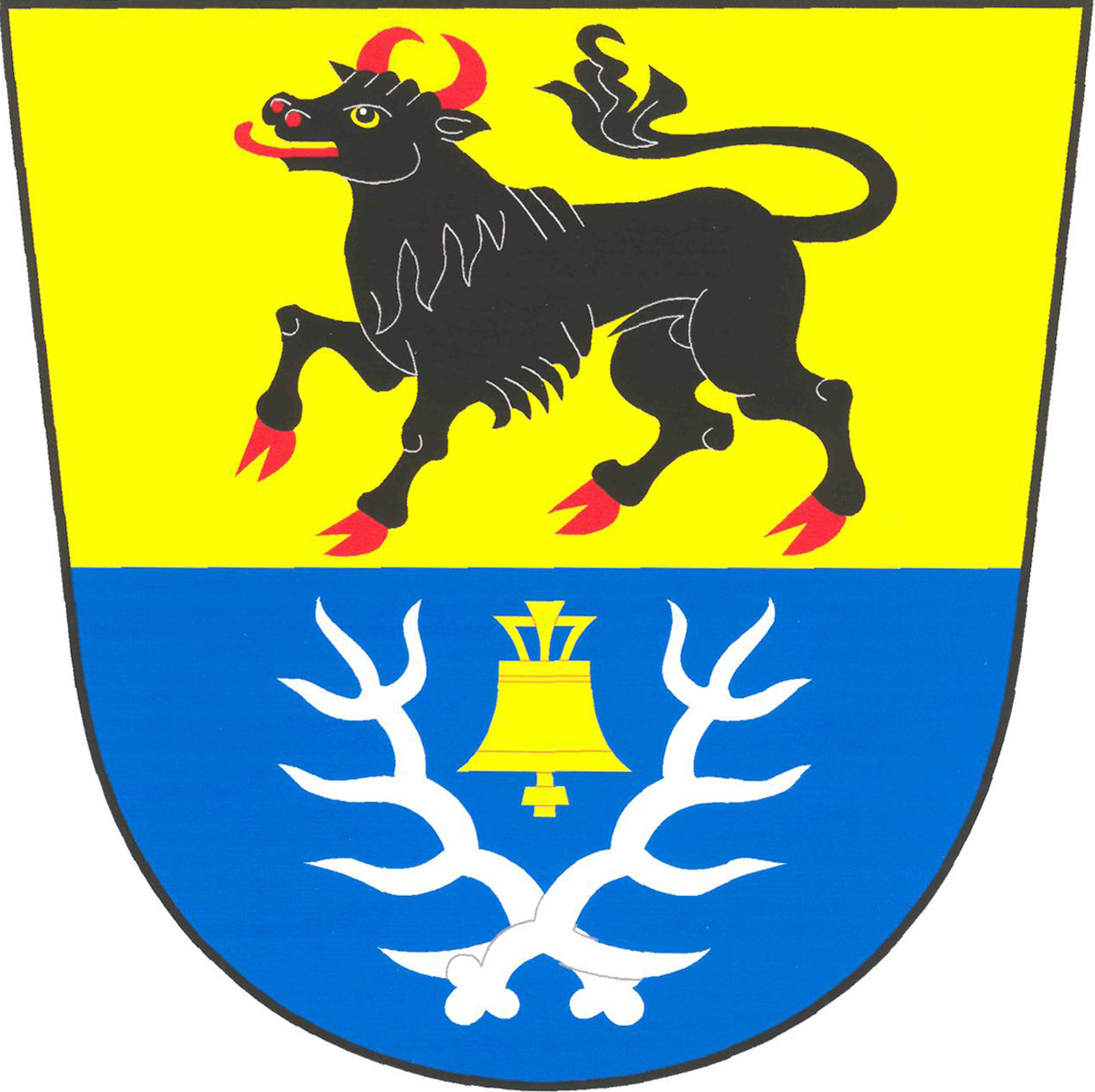
- Flag Coat of arms

- Location in the Czech Republic
- Coordinates: 49°54′36″N 14°7′4″E
- Country: Czech Republic
- Region: Central Bohemian
- District: Beroun
- First mentioned: 1389

Area
  - Total: 8.16 km^{2} (3.15 sq mi)
- Elevation: 318 m (1,043 ft)

Population (2026-01-01)
  - Total: 310
  - Density: 38/km^{2} (98/sq mi)
- Time zone: UTC+1 (CET)
  - Summer (DST): UTC+2 (CEST)
- Postal code: 267 27
- Website: www.menany.eu

Měňany is a municipality and village in Beroun District in the Central Bohemian Region of the Czech Republic. It has about 300 inhabitants.

== Administrative division ==
Měňany consists of two municipal parts (in brackets population according to the 2021 census):

- Měňany (246)
- Tobolka (61)

== Demographics ==
Historical population
Year	Pop.	±%
1869	412	—
1880	425	+3.2%
1890	459	+8.0%
1900	452	−1.5%
1910	486	+7.5%
1921	440	−9.5%
1930	425	−3.4%
1950	344	−19.1%
1961	331	−3.8%
1970	319	−3.6%
1980	308	−3.4%
1991	269	−12.7%
2001	285	+5.9%
2011	307	+7.7%
2021	307	+0.0%
Source: Censuses

== Geography ==
Měňany is located about 7 kilometres (4 mi) southeast of Beroun, in the Bohemian Karst Protected Landscape Area. The Stříbrný Stream flows through the municipality. Part of the Kobyla Nature Reserve lies within its territory.

== Energy ==
Měňany’s municipal biomass district heating plant began trial operation in October 2007. It uses three boilers to burn wood chips, sawdust, bark and other wood residues. The municipality owns and operates the system. In 2024, the Energy Regulatory Office recorded an installed thermal capacity of 1.12 MW and 70 customers connected to the network.

The municipality received a grant from the State Environmental Fund and borrowed money to build the heating system. Repaying the loan left less money for other municipal projects. In November 2008, the heating project won the Czech Energy Globe competition.

In 2025, the municipality worked with the Research Institute for Landscape on a demonstration planting of fast-growing poplars to explore local production of fuel for heating. Approximately 2,900 cuttings were planted during a workshop in April.
