= Tekla Baťková =

Czech singer

Tekla Baťková, also known as Tekla Batková or Tekla Baťková-Podleská (née Podleská; 3 December 1764, Beroun – 28 August 1852, Prague), was a Czech singer. She was engaged as the official singer of the court of the Duchy of Courland from 1782 to 1795. She also made several successful tours throughout Europe before, during, and after her tenure as court singer.
