= Hlásná Třebaň =

- Municipality
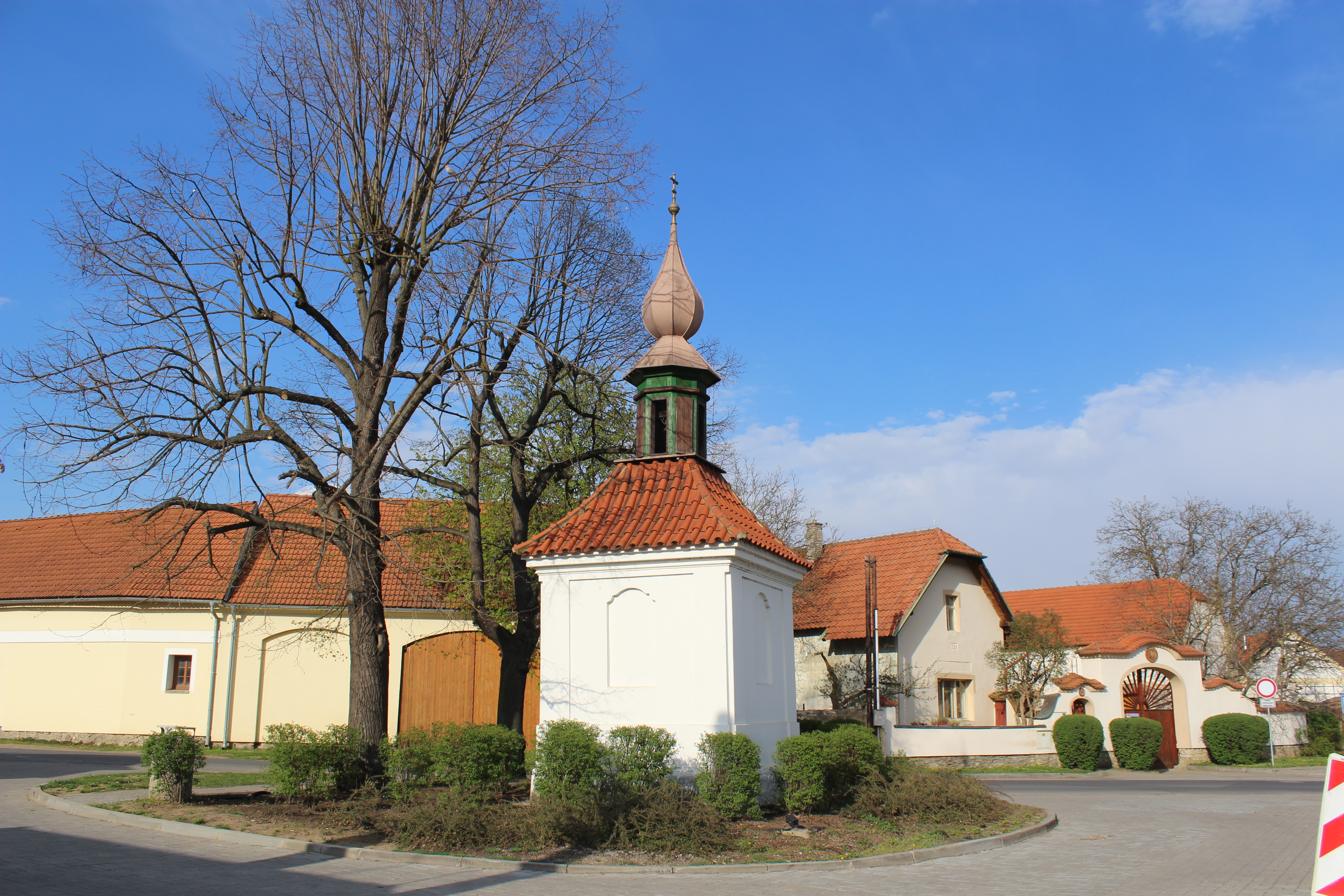
- Chapel in Hlásná Třebaň

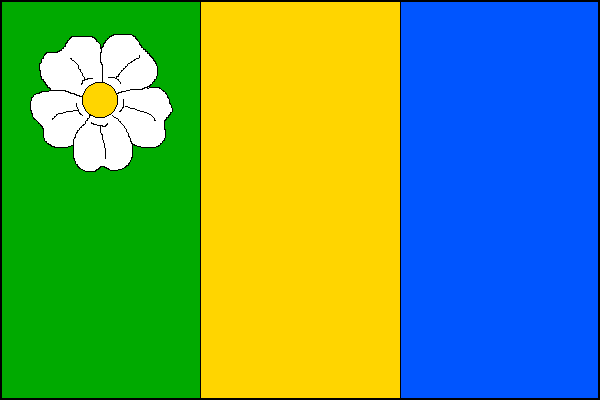
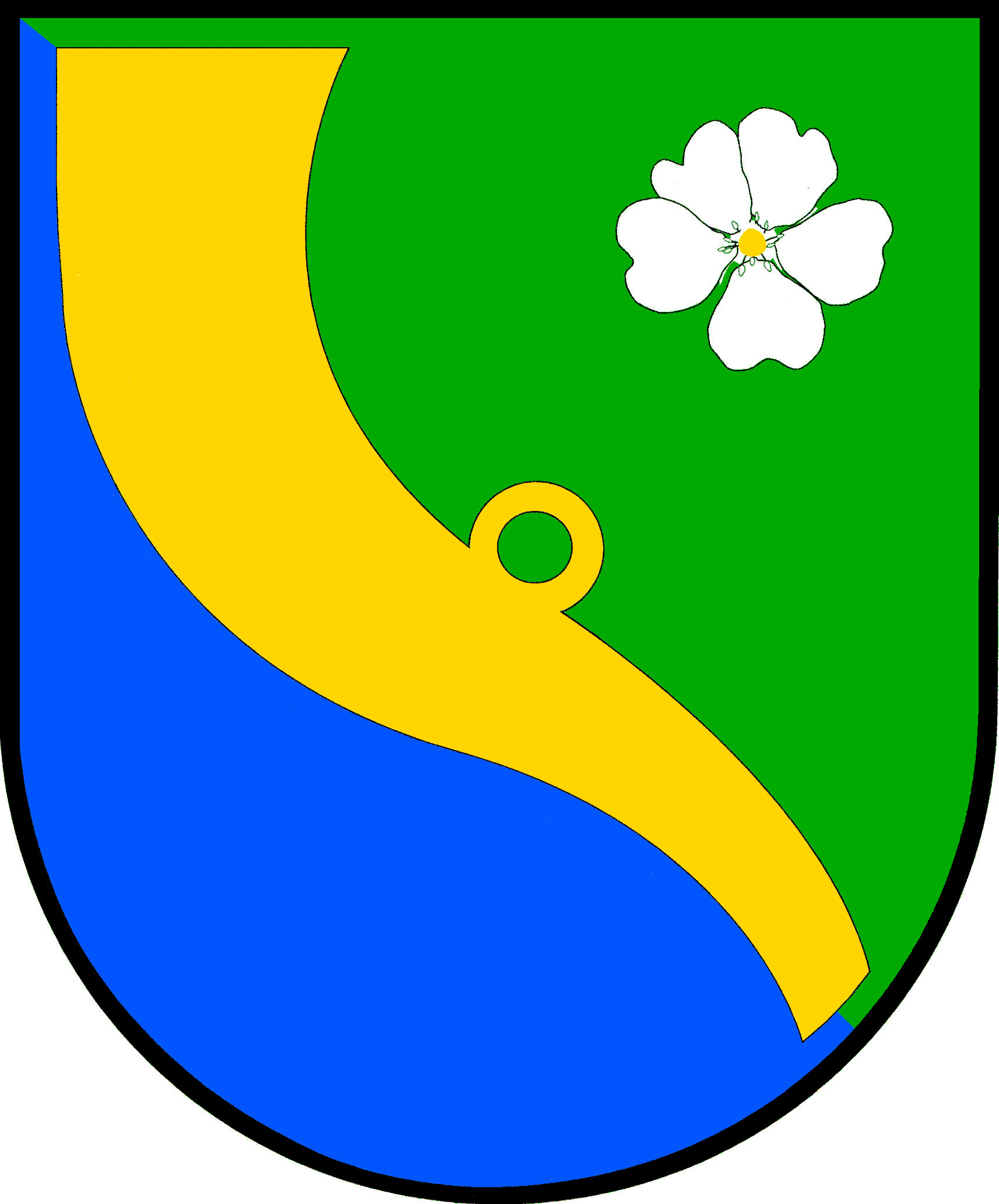
- Flag Coat of arms

- Location in the Czech Republic
- Coordinates: 49°55′20″N 14°11′55″E
- Country: Czech Republic
- Region: Central Bohemian
- District: Beroun
- First mentioned: 1000

Area
  - Total: 4.08 km^{2} (1.58 sq mi)
- Elevation: 214 m (702 ft)

Population (2026-01-01)
  - Total: 1,272
  - Density: 312/km^{2} (807/sq mi)
- Time zone: UTC+1 (CET)
  - Summer (DST): UTC+2 (CEST)
- Postal code: 267 18
- Website: www.hlasnatreban.cz

Hlásná Třebaň is a municipality and village in Beroun District in the Central Bohemian Region of the Czech Republic. It has about 1,300 inhabitants.

== Administrative division ==
Hlásná Třebaň consists of two municipal parts (in brackets population according to the 2021 census):

- Hlásná Třebaň (929)
- Rovina (363)

== Etymology ==
The name Třebaň is derived from the personal name Třeban, meaning "Třeban's (court)". Originally, the village was called Přední Třebaň ('front Třebaň') to distinguish it from Zadní Třebaň ('back Třebaň') on the opposite bank of the Berounka River. The prefix referred to the location of the village in relation to the Karlštejn Castle. In the 14th century, it was renamed Hlásná Třebaň ('guarding Třebaň').

== Geography ==
Hlásná Třebaň is located about 10 kilometres (6 mi) southeast of Beroun and 17 km (11 mi) southwest of Prague. It lies in the Hořovice Uplands. The highest point is at 385 m (1,263 ft) above sea level. The municipality in situated on the left bank of the Berounka River. Most of the municipal territory lies within the Bohemian Karst Protected Landscape Area.

== History ==
The first written mention of Přední Třebaň is from 1000, when Duke Boleslaus III donated the village to the newly established Ostrov Monastery in Davle. King Charles IV bought the village in 1357 and joined it to the Karlštejn estate. Přední Třebaň was renamed Hlásná Třebaň due to the obligation of the men in the village to carry out guarding service (hlásná služba) at Karlštejn Castle.

The village of Rovina was established between 1784 and 1808.

== Demographics ==
Historical population

Year	Pop.	±%
1869	428	—
1880	434	+1.4%
1890	402	−7.4%
1900	432	+7.5%
1910	361	−16.4%

Year	Pop.	±%
1921	331	−8.3%
1930	358	+8.2%
1950	487	+36.0%
1961	523	+7.4%
1970	442	−15.5%

Year	Pop.	±%
1980	427	−3.4%
1991	421	−1.4%
2001	483	+14.7%
2011	902	+86.7%
2021	1,292	+43.2%

Source: Censuses

== Transport ==
There are no railways or major roads passing through the municipality.

== Sights ==
The only protected cultural monument in the municipality is a late Baroque chapel from 1867, located in the centre of the Hlásná Třebaň.
