= Šimůnek =

Šimůnek (feminine Šimůnková) is a Czech surname. Notable people include:

- František Šimůnek, Czech Nordic skier
- Jan Šimůnek, Czech footballer
- Jaromír Šimůnek, Czech biathlete
- Karel Šimůnek, Czech watercolorist and illustrator
- Ladislav Šimůnek, Czech footballer
- Radomír Šimůnek, Jr., Czech cyclist
- Radomír Šimůnek, Sr., Czech cyclist
- Vladimír Šimůnek, Czech cross-country skier
