= Spala =

Spala may refer to:

- Spała, a village in Poland
- Špála, a Czech surname
