= Špála =

Špála (feminine: Špálová) is a Czech surname. Notable people with the surname include:

- Milada Špálová (1884–1963), painter
- Václav Špála (1885–1946), painter, graphic designer and illustrator
