= Church of Saint James the Great, Beroun =

Church in the Czech Republic

Coordinates: 49°57′50″N 14°4′18″E

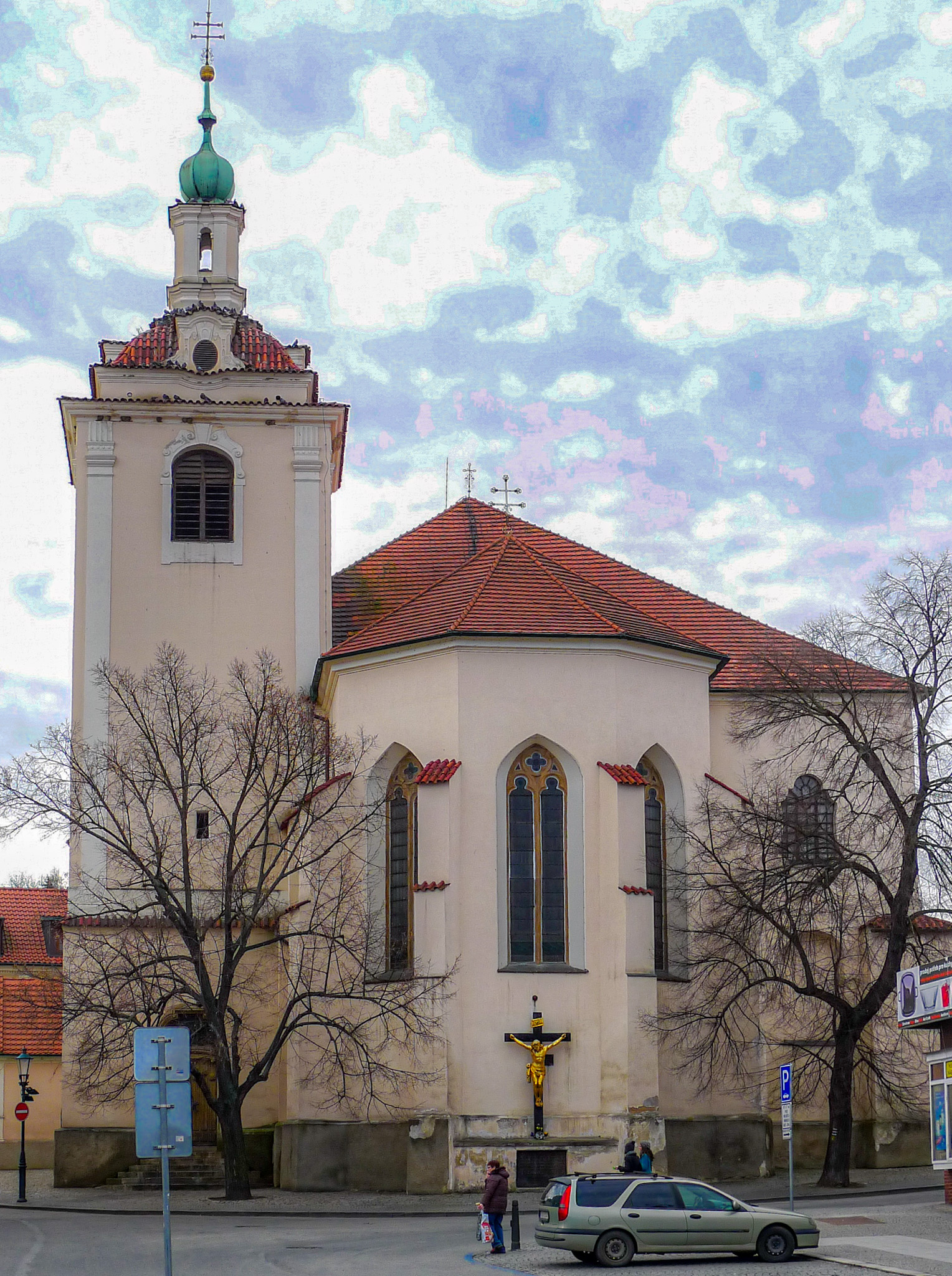
View from the east

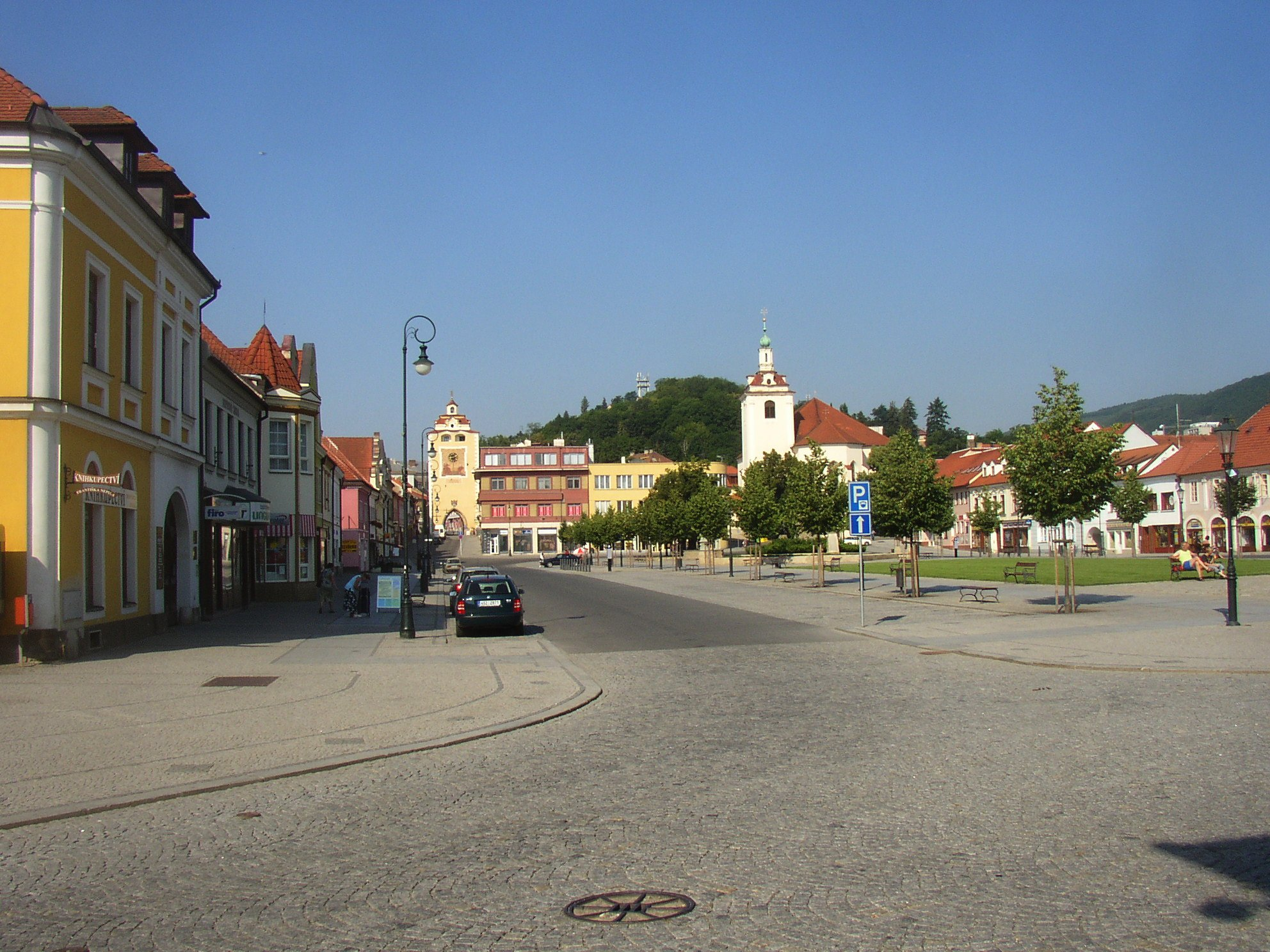
The church on the right of the Plzeňská Gate and in front of the observation tower

Church of Saint James the Great (Czech: Kostel svatého Jakuba) is a church in Beroun in the Central Bohemian Region of the Czech Republic. It is dedicated to Saint James the Great. It is situated in the middle of the square Seydlovo náměstí. It has a Gothic core, but after it was damaged by fires, it was rebuilt in the Baroque style. The church has been protected as a cultural monument since 1958.

== History ==
It was built in the 13th century and until the sixteenth century, it was surrounded by a cemetery. The church survived several fires and was pillaged by the Swedes before the Treaty of Westphalia was signed. In the 17th century, a bell tower was added to the church on its southern side. In the year 1680, a plague pillar was erected in front of the entrance, as 341 citizens of the town – one half of its population – were killed by the disease.

in 1903–1907, it was reconstructed by Josef Fanta.

== Interiors ==
Most of the interior decorations of the church date back to the 18th century, which is also the date when the paintings of St. James the Great and St. John of Nepomuk (1744) were created by J. P. Molitor. Another of the paintings was created by the school of Anthony van Dyck and depicts the cross of Jesus. Other relics include the tin baptistry (1606) by Matěj Flamínek, the carved pulpit by Josef Šnábl and the plaque of the married couple bearing the name "Henich" from the revolutionary year of 1848.

In 2000, four church bells were made for the church by Josef Manoušek. Each of the bells were named after Czech saints; Wenceslaus, Adalbert, Agnes and Ludmila. The financing came from sponsors and the citizens of the town themselves, who contributed to the fund-raising campaign. Four years later, the church was given a pipe organ from Beroun's former twin town Rijswijk in the Netherlands.
