= Dolly Perutz =

American artist

Adolphine Dolly Perutz (1908–1979) was an American sculptor and graphic artist.

== Biography ==
Perutz was born in Beroun, just outside of Prague, Austria Hungary. Perutz was Jewish; when the Germans occupied Czechoslovakia in 1938, she and her husband Tino Perutz decided to move to the United States.

Examples of Perutz's work are included in the collections of the Whitney Museum of American Art, the Brooklyn Museum, the New York Public Library and the Metropolitan Museum of Art. Her sculpture Bird Flying Machine is part of the collection of the New York City Parks department, and is on display on the roof of the Arsenal, Central Park.
