= Chapel of Virgin Mary of Sorrows, Beroun =

Chapel in the Czech Republic

Chapel of Our Lady of Sorrows, Beroun
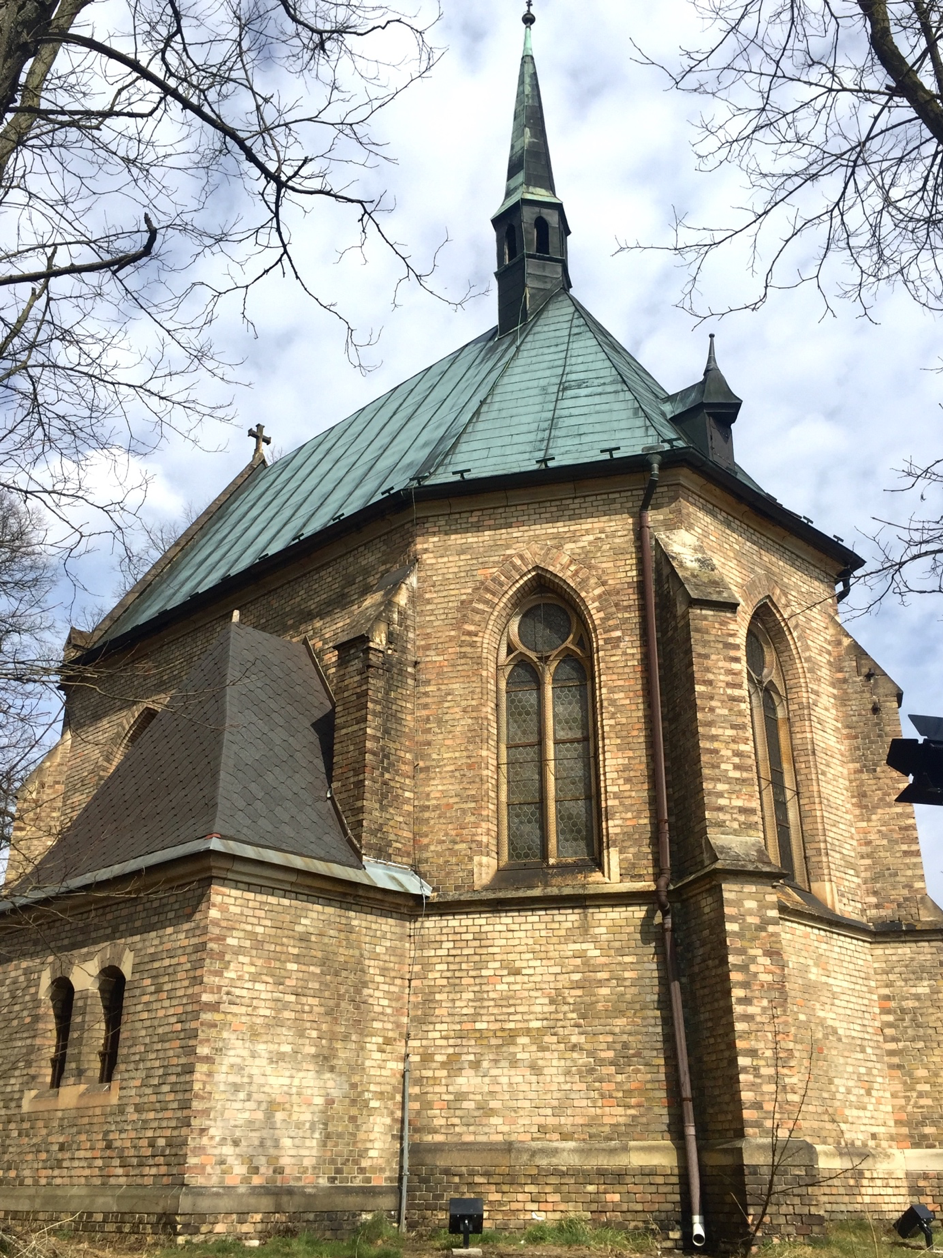
- South-western view of the chapel
- Interactive map of the Chapel of Our Lady of Sorrows, Beroun area

General information
- Architectural style: Gothic Revival
- Location: Beroun, Czech Republic
- Coordinates: 49°58′17.9292″N 14°3′36.8964″E
- Completed: 1893

Design and construction
- Architect: Josef Mocker

Chapel of Our Lady of Sorrows (Czech: Kaple Bolestné Panny Marie) is a chapel in Beroun in the Central Bohemian Region of the Czech Republic. It is located on one of the highest points of the town. On 3 May 1958 the chapel was officially listed as a cultural heritage site.

== History ==
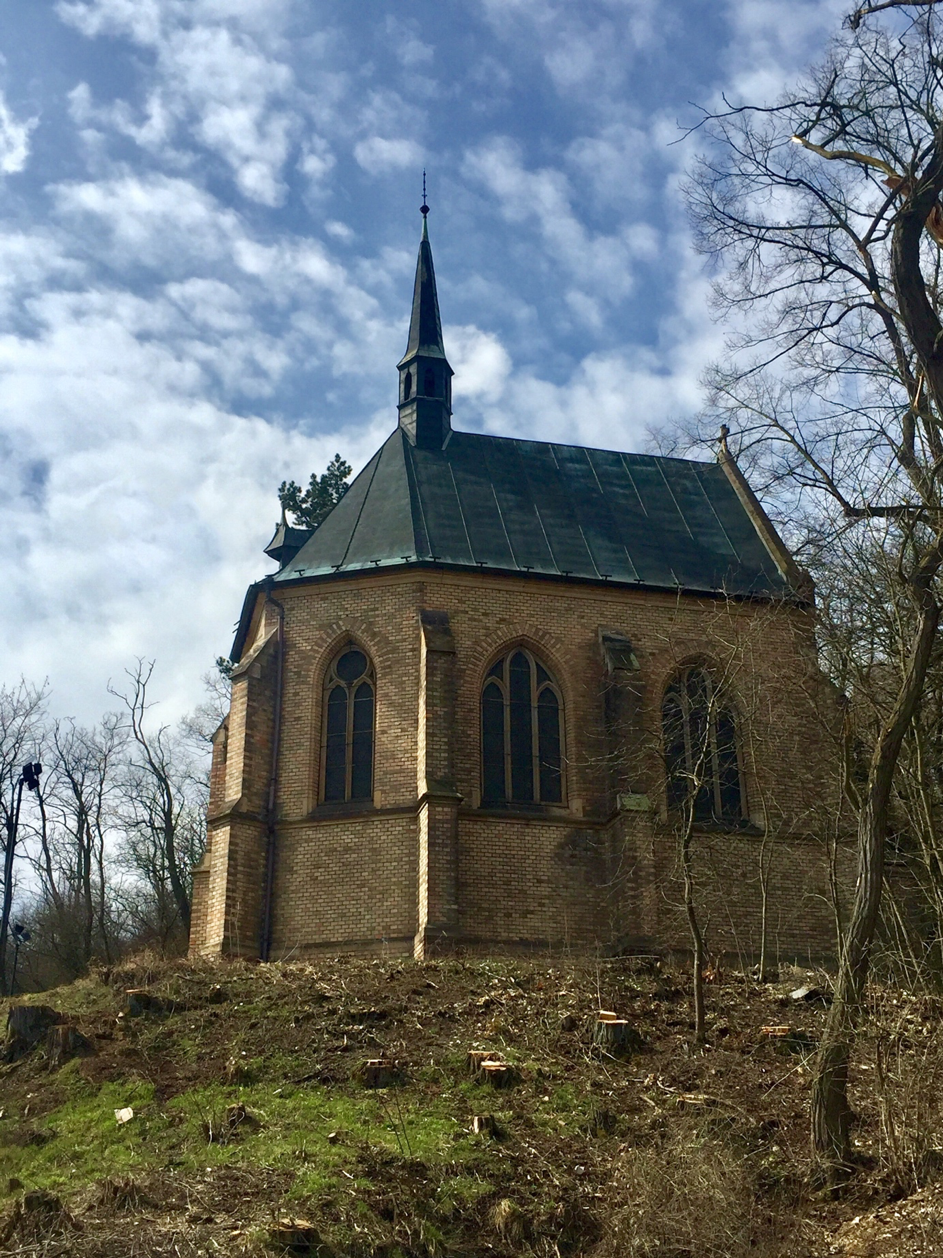
Eastern view

From 1715 to 1736 the parish of Beroun was administered by Dean Jiří František Procházka de Lauro, originally from Telč. As dean, he was very active in promoting the spiritual life in the town and supported the construction of the Holy Water Chapel, which became a popular destination for pilgrims coming to the town. The pilgrims began visiting the town due to a local legend from 1723, when a local shepherd had a vision revealing the miraculous properties of the spring there. The Stations of the Cross were built there for pilgrims, and between 1733 and 1786 it was protected and maintained by hermits living near the chapel.

In 1784 the chapel was closed by order of Emperor Joseph II, who ordered the abolition of all monasteries, spiritual communities, and fraternities that did not meet the conditions for remaining in service. The chapel was later sold.

The painting of the Virgin Mary from the chapel was taken to the Dean's church in Beroun. The desecrated chapel, including the neighbouring cottage, was purchased by Jakub Černý, who made it available for the local dwellers for worship. The chapel gradually deteriorated and had to be demolished.

In 1893, the architect Josef Mocker built a new chapel in the Gothic Revival design, which remains standing on the hill above Beroun.

== Architecture ==
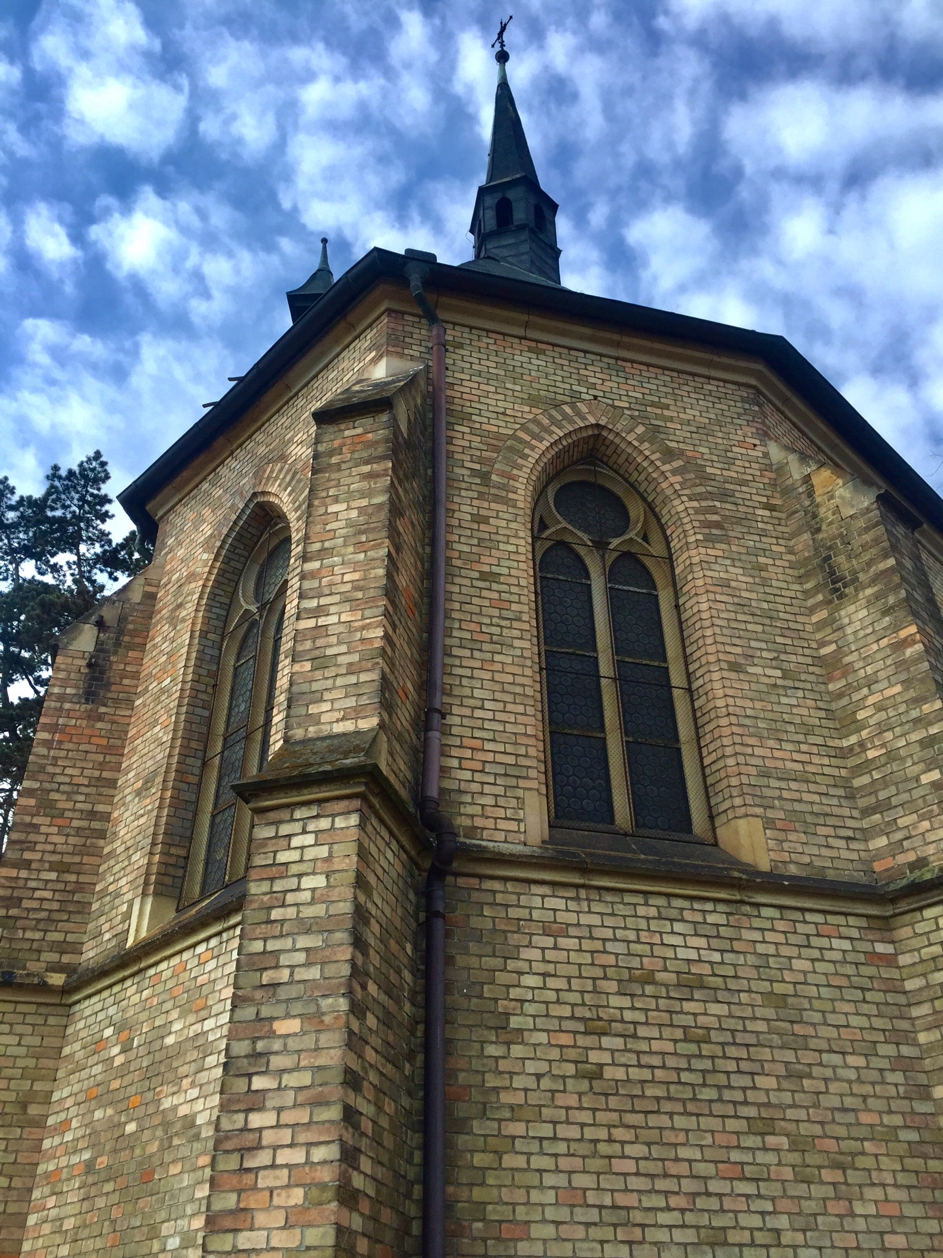
South-eastern view

=== Exterior ===
The chapel is an atrium type. It is a small rectangular building of red bricks with a triangular edge. It is covered with a gabled roof holding a small turret (called Sanctus) with two suspended bells (one of them is fully functional). The turret with the bells is located above the main altar.

The vault is held by double buttresses along the entire circumference of the structure. This enabled the installation of larger windows in the characteristic pointed arch shape. Some of the windows are decorated with tracery. The windows are separated by one or two bars.

The entrance portal is built of sandstone blocks holding the vault with a rounded profile. The space above the portal bears a quatrefoil with an ornamental rosette in the center.

The well is situated opposite the main entrance to the chapel. It is a small structure with a hipped gable roof, again in red brick. The structure is not situated in the usual east–west direction; it was positioned with its front view facing the old town of Beroun.

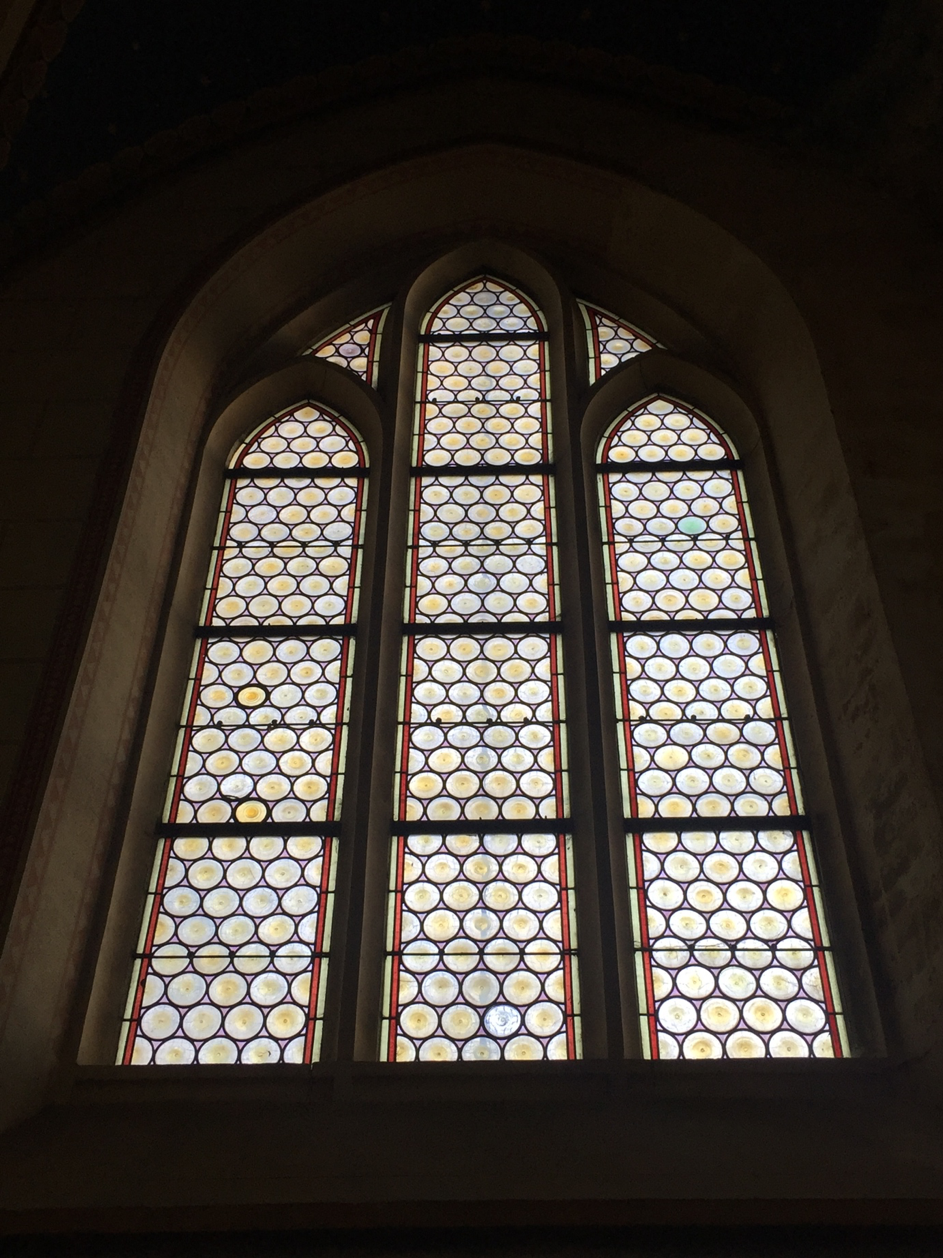
Window in a shape of pointed arch

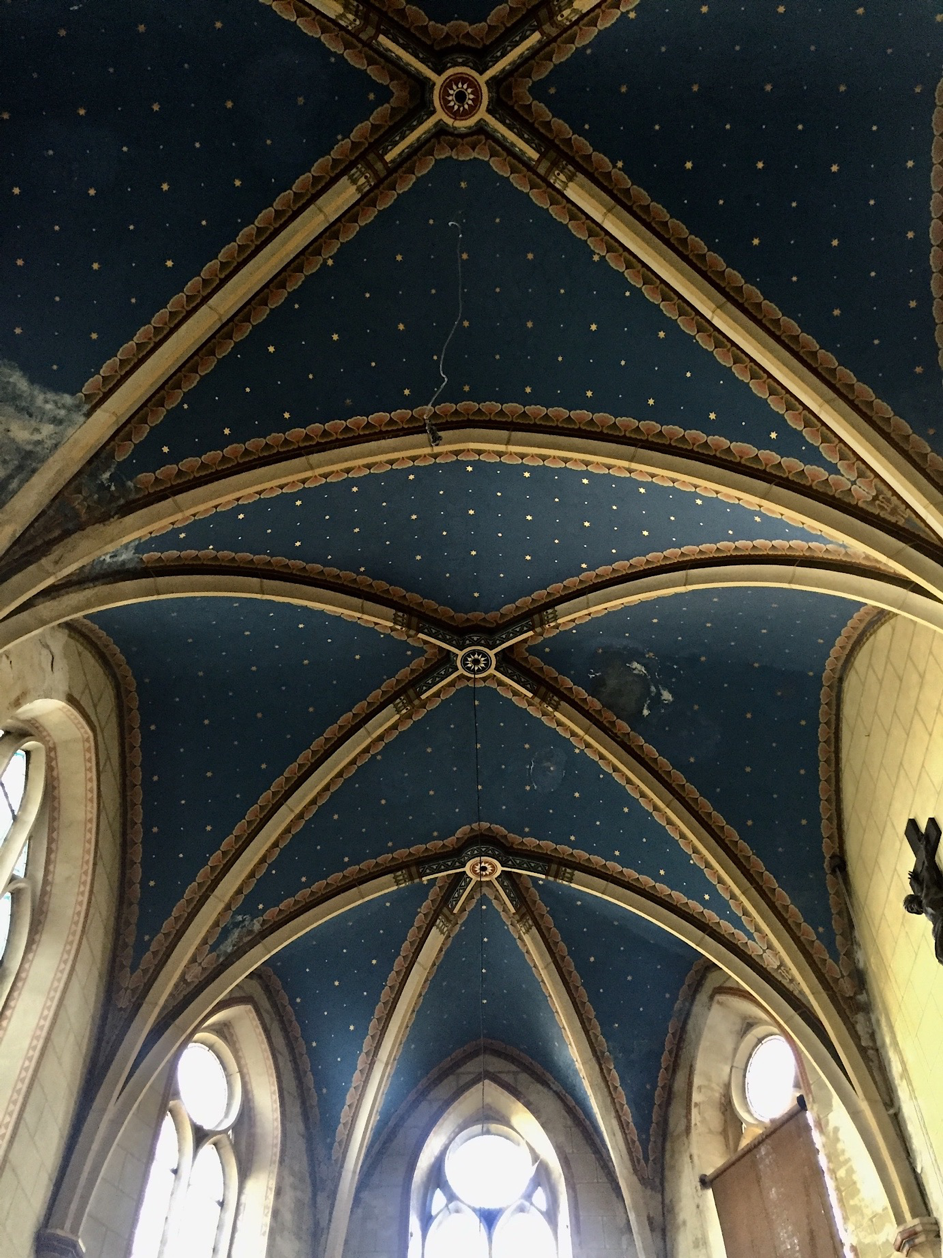
Ceiling with cross arch

=== Interior ===
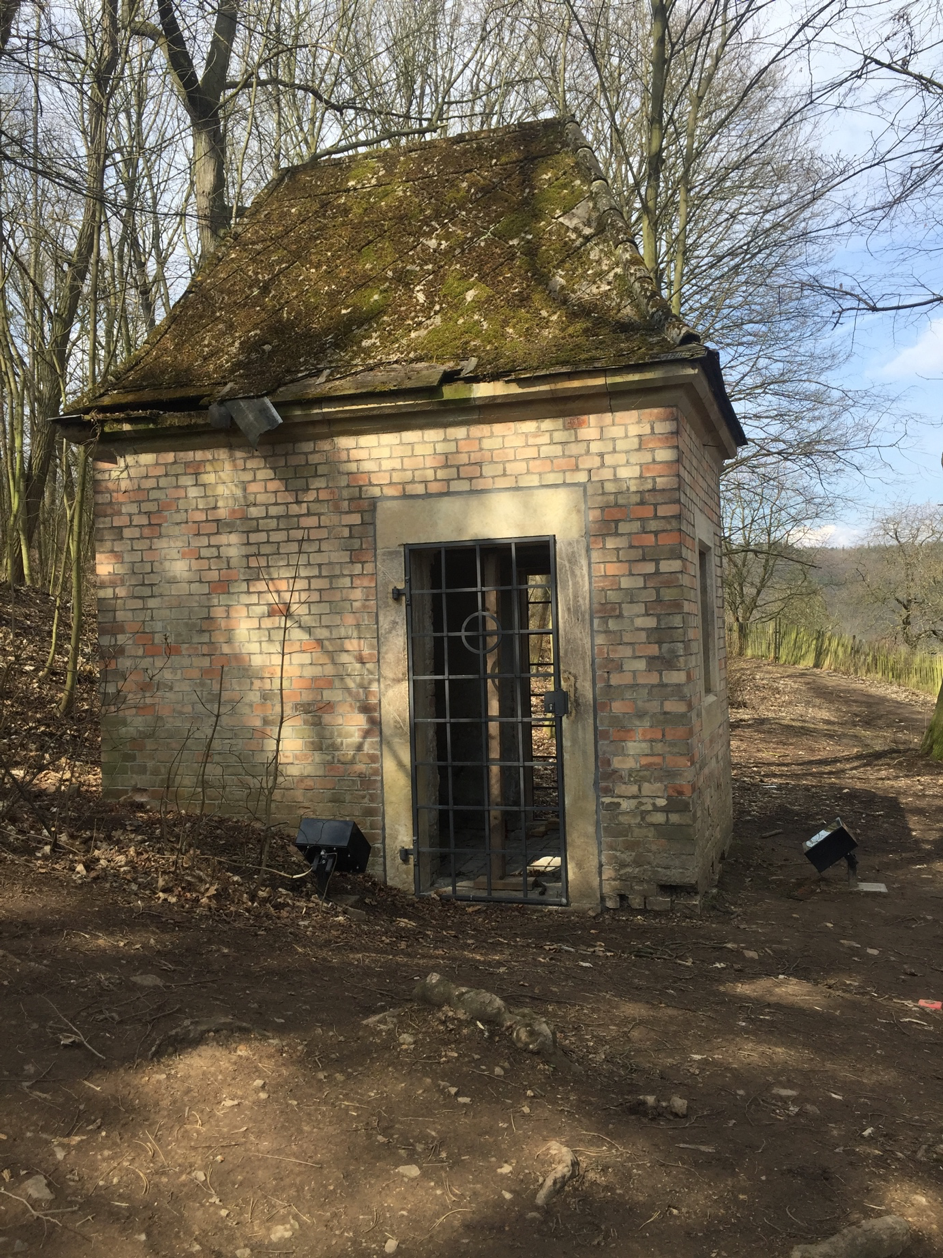
Well situated opposite of the chapel

The chapel interior consists of three parts. The covered entry hall separates the main atrium from the entrance portal. The interior is lit by a single window with a segmented vault and ribbed vaults in the vestibule area. A holy water font (aspersorium) is located at the entrance to the main atrium. A painted ceiling dominates the interior – it is decorated as a night sky (a European rarity). This is further enhanced by the ribbed vaults that add extra depth to the space. The ribs join in a console with a polygonal head, there is no supporting pillar. The keystone at the crossing of the ribs is decorated with floral ornament. The tall broken arch windows are glazed with colourful stained-glass panes.

=== The altar ===
The altar draws the attention with its side pinnacles and a lavish floral ornament on the top. The walls are decorated to create the illusion of a stone masonry. A painting of Virgin Mary with the Holy Infant hangs above the main portal. In 1737 the chapel received the gift of a painting of Virgin Mary that is displayed above one of the side altars in the Church of St. James the Great.
