= Milada Špálová =

Czech painter (1884–1963)

- Born: Milada Benešová; 31 May 1884; Beroun, Bohemia, Austria-Hungary
- Died: 1 December 1963 (aged 79)
- Known for: Painting

Milada Špálová (née Benešová; 1884 – 1963) was a Czech painter.

== Early life ==
Špálová was born on 31 May 1884 (some sources say 30 May) in Beroun, Bohemia, Austria-Hungary (now the Czech Republic). Her parents were Jan and Aloisia Beneš (née Vocloňová) and she was the third of four children. Due to her father's profession, the family moved frequently. Although born in Beroun, Špálová spent her early childhood in Turnov, living with her aunt and uncle, who were childless. Many of her later paintings were to show scenes from the Turnov area, such as the Kost Castle and the Trosky Castle. In 1899, she returned to Prague with her family. Between 1900 and 1905, she studied at the School of Applied Arts in Prague under Josef Schusser. She completed her studies in Munich, studying figurative painting with Walter Thor.

== Artistic career ==
Back in Prague, she joined the Artěl cooperative of artists, founded in 1908. The first major exhibition she participated in was one in Turnov, which took place in 1911. After that, several other successful individual and many group exhibitions followed. She was an early member of the Central Association of Czech Women, and a permanent member of its Fine Arts Department, known as the Circle of Women Artists. On 24 June 1915, she married František Špála, the brother of the painter, Václav Špála. Less than a year after the wedding, they had their first child, Milena. In the same year, 1916, she ended her involvement with Artěl, but she still maintained her artistic ambitions.

Špálová lived in Transcarpathia in Ukraine with her family between 1919 and 1938, where her husband, a trained locksmith and blacksmith who spoke Russian well, worked as the director of a vocational school in Sevljuš and as an inspector of other vocational schools. At this time the region of Ukraine was under Czechoslovak rule. The family's living conditions gave Špálová adequate space for her work, and she began to concentrate more on still lifes, particularly of fruit. Other local painters included Adalbert Erdeli and Jossyp Bokschaj. In 1933, Špálová and family moved to Uzhhorod in Ukraine, living there until 1938. There was already an association of local artists, mostly Czechs, in the area and Špálová joined this association, as did her student, Anna Lánczyová. The association had its debut exhibition in 1934 where she presented her flower still lifes. In February 1937, she was among those from Czechoslovakia to exhibit in Les femmes artistes d'Europe, the first international all-woman art show in France, held at the Jeu de Paume in Paris.

== Works ==
Partly due to the time she spent in the Ukraine, very few of Špálová's works are found in Czech galleries. However, her art has been widely available on the commercial art market. Her oil paintings included clean, simply composed still lifes, using traditional objects of fruit and flowers. A great love for the countryside, especially that of Ukraine, is reflected in her landscapes. She also did watercolours and, in 1925, participated with two works in the Second International Watercolour Exhibition, held in Milan. More commercially, she did drawings for magazines, primarily those aimed at women. Other works include two wooden dolls from 1920, which are held by the Museum of Decorative Arts in Prague.

== Exhibitions ==
Špálová held three solo exhibitions and contributed to numerous joint exhibitions, almost all of which were held in what was then Czechoslovakia. She frequently contributed to the exhibitions of the Circle of Fine Artists, usually held at the Municipal House in Prague, and also showed at exhibitions devoted solely to women's art.

== Later life and death ==
As a result of the Nazi occupation of Czechoslovakia, the family was forced to return to Prague in 1939. A year later, her son, Vratislav, died. After the war, she continued to exhibit with the Circle of Fine Artists. In 1956, she moved permanently to Liberec and in 1959, on her 75th birthday, an exhibition of her works was held in that city. She died on 1 December 1963.
