= Osov (Beroun District) =

- Municipality
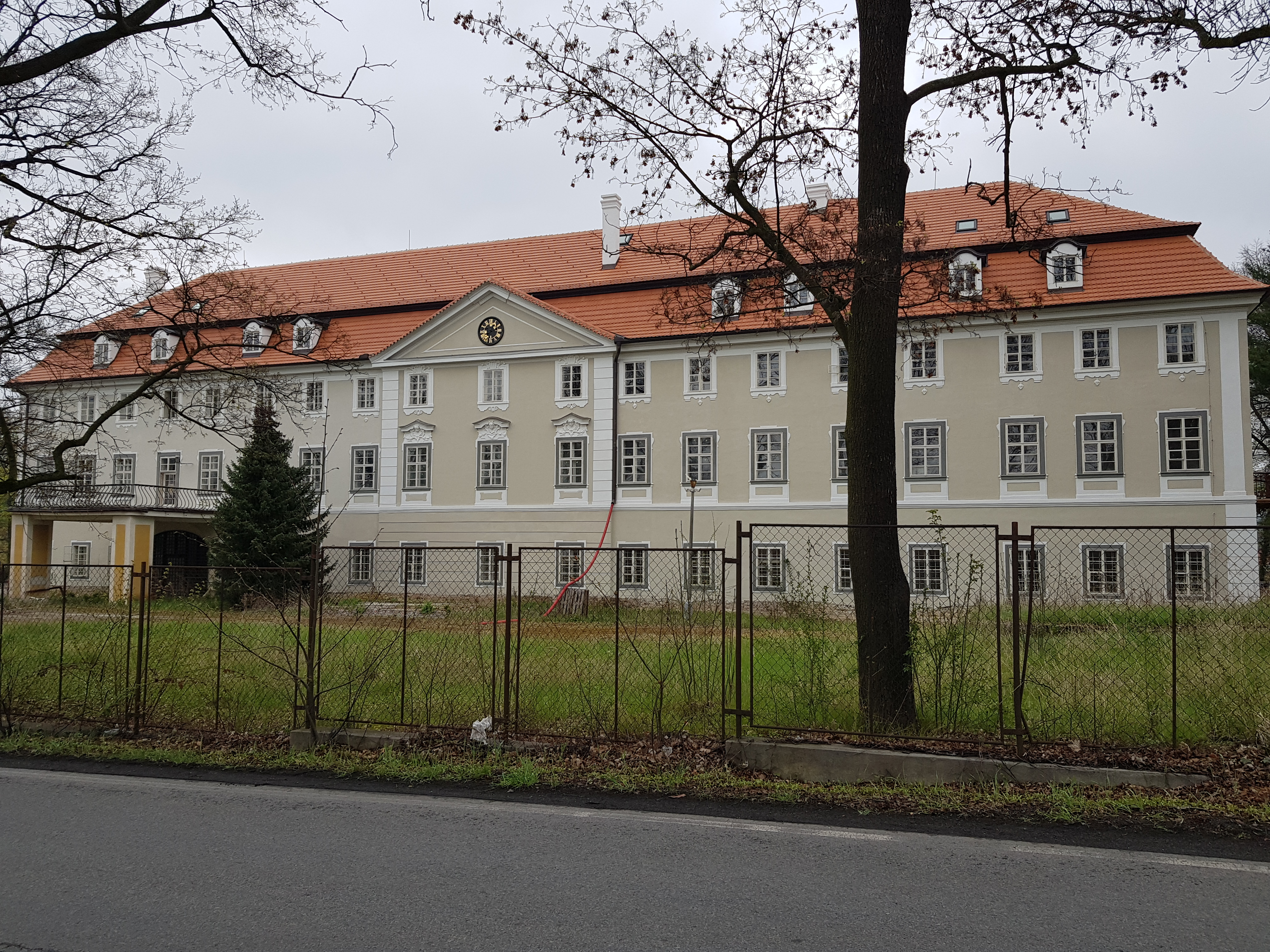
- Osov Castle

- Flag Coat of arms

- Location in the Czech Republic
- Coordinates: 49°50′40″N 14°5′2″E
- Country: Czech Republic
- Region: Central Bohemian
- District: Beroun
- First mentioned: 1225

Area
  - Total: 2.45 km^{2} (0.95 sq mi)
- Elevation: 365 m (1,198 ft)

Population (2026-01-01)
  - Total: 316
  - Density: 129/km^{2} (334/sq mi)
- Time zone: UTC+1 (CET)
  - Summer (DST): UTC+2 (CEST)
- Postal code: 267 25
- Website: www.osov.cz

Osov is a municipality and village in Beroun District in the Central Bohemian Region of the Czech Republic. It has about 300 inhabitants.

== Administrative division ==
Osov consists of two municipal parts (in brackets population according to the 2021 census):

- Osov (215)
- Osovec (89)

== Etymology ==
The name is derived from the personal name Osa, meaning "Osa's (court)".

== Geography ==
Osov is located about 13 kilometres (8 mi) south of Beroun and 31 km (19 mi) southwest of Prague. It lies in an agricultural landscape in the Hořovice Uplands. The highest point is at 411 m (1,348 ft) above sea level.

== History ==
The first written mention of Osov is from 1225. It was the centre of a small estate, owned predominantly by various lower noble families. Until the early 18th century, the owners often changed. From the beginning of the 18th century until 1804, Osov was a property of the Kaunitz family and experienced its greatest development.

== Demographics ==
Historical population

Year	Pop.	±%
1869	643	—
1880	630	−2.0%
1890	564	−10.5%
1900	626	+11.0%
1910	560	−10.5%

Year	Pop.	±%
1921	563	+0.5%
1930	490	−13.0%
1950	467	−4.7%
1961	371	−20.6%
1970	434	+17.0%

Year	Pop.	±%
1980	418	−3.7%
1991	412	−1.4%
2001	338	−18.0%
2011	354	+4.7%
2021	304	−14.1%

Source: Censuses

== Transport ==
Osov is located on the railway line of local importance from Lochovice to Zadní Třebaň.

== Sights ==
The main landmark of Osov is Osov Castle. It was built in the late Baroque style in 1728–1735 for Jan Adolf of Kaunitz. It is surrounded by a park.

The regular agricultural landscape around Osov with a net of paths lined with avenues is protected as a landscape monument zone. It was established in two phases, after the Thirty Years' War and after 1805.
