= Ludmila Vachtová =

Czech art historian and art critic (1933–2020)

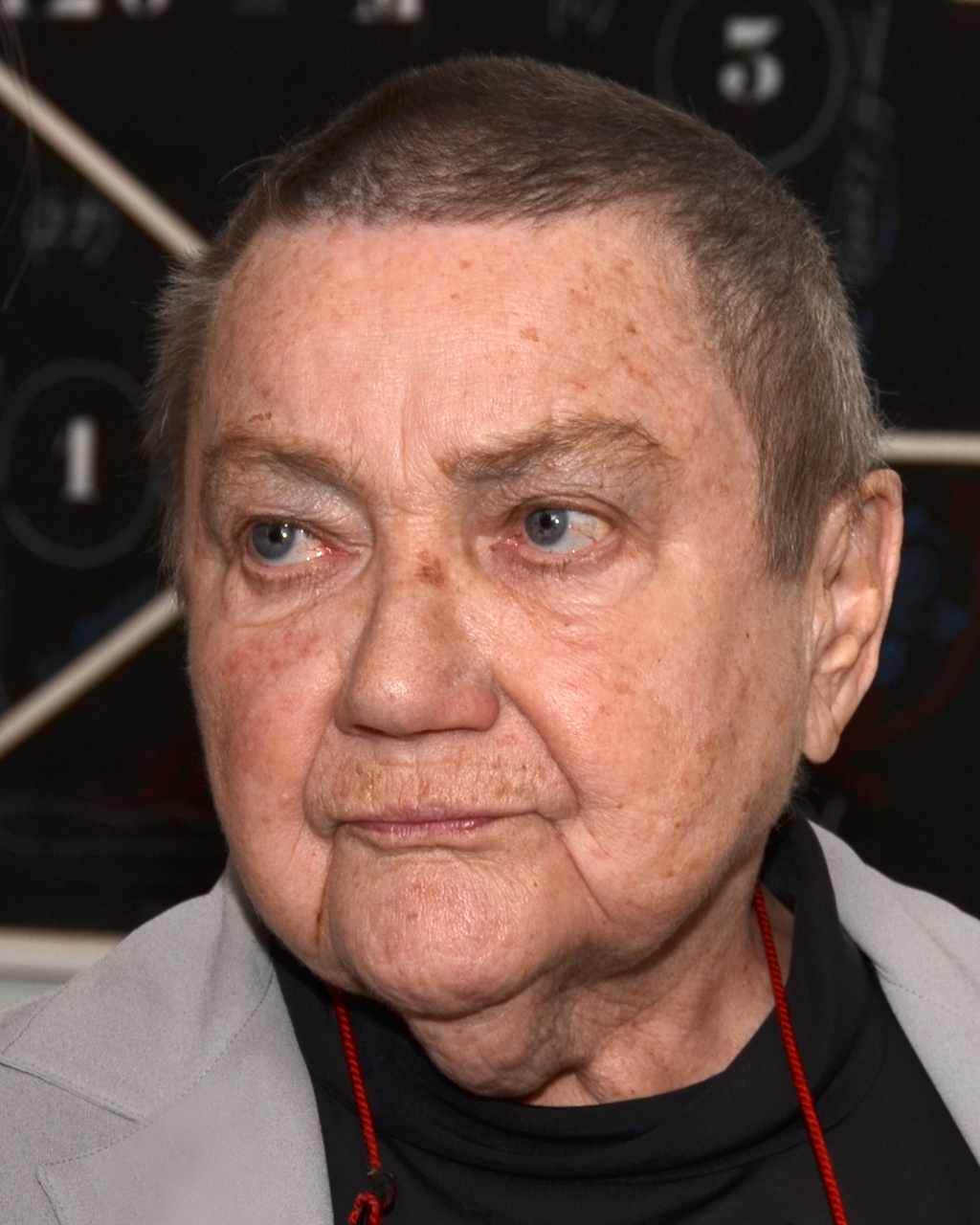
- Born: 24 September 1933; Beroun
- Died: 23 July 2020 (aged 86); Zürich, Switzerland
- Occupations: art historian and art critic

Ludmila Vachtová (24 September 1933 – 23 July 2020) was a Czech art historian, art critic, curator and translator. In the 1960s, she curated the Gallery on Charles Square and the Platýz Gallery. She lived in Switzerland since 1972. She also published books on the history of art and the lives of specific artists, including Frank Kupka, Pioneer of Abstract Art in 1968.

Vachtová died in Zürich on July 23, 2020 at the age of 86.
