= Vosava, Minsk district =

Village in Minsk Region, Belarus

Vosava Восава
- Village
- Location within Belarus
- Coordinates: 54°1′11″N 27°30′2″E
- Country: Belarus
- Region: Minsk Region
- District: Minsk District
- Time zone: UTC+3 (MSK)

Vosava (Belarusian: Восава) is a village in Minsk District, Minsk Region, Belarus.
