= Karel Šimůnek =

Czech artist (1869 – 1942)

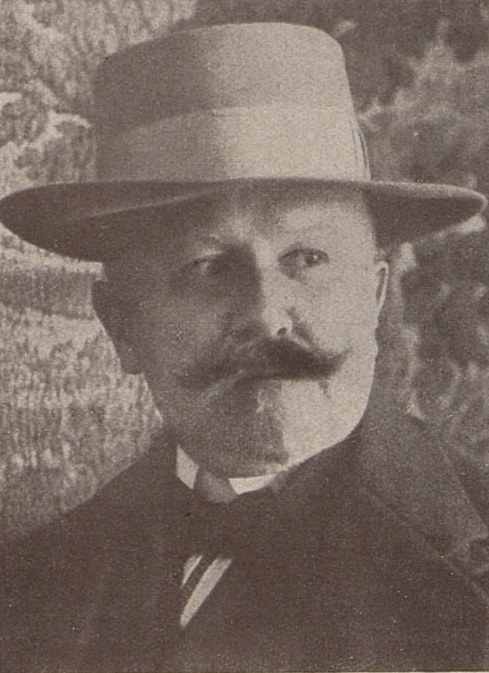
Karel Šimůnek – 1927

Karel Šimůnek (31 August 1869 in Beroun – 19 July 1942 in Prague) was a Czech watercolorist and illustrator, and a designer of posters and of theatrical sets. He studied at the Academy of Fine Arts in Prague under Professors Václav Brožík and Maximilian Pirner.

== Gallery ==
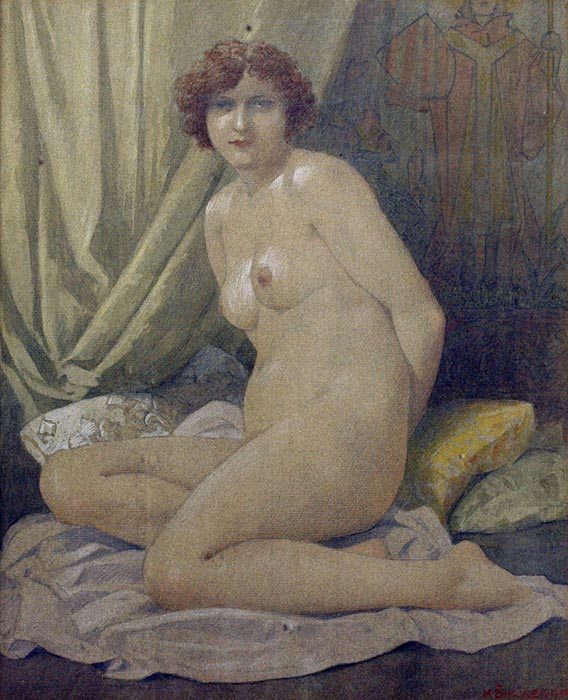
Female nude (1934)

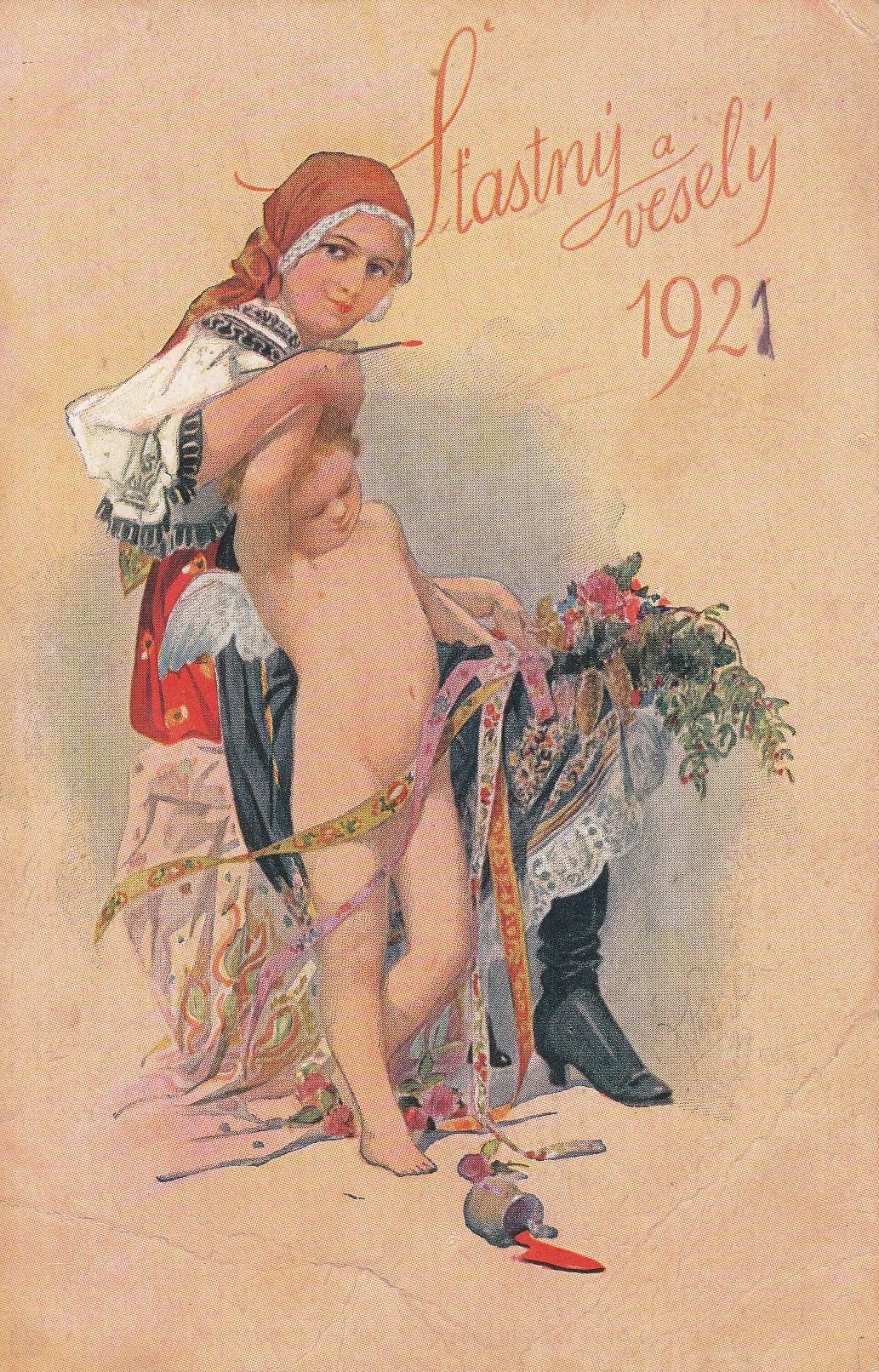
Happy and cheerful (1921)

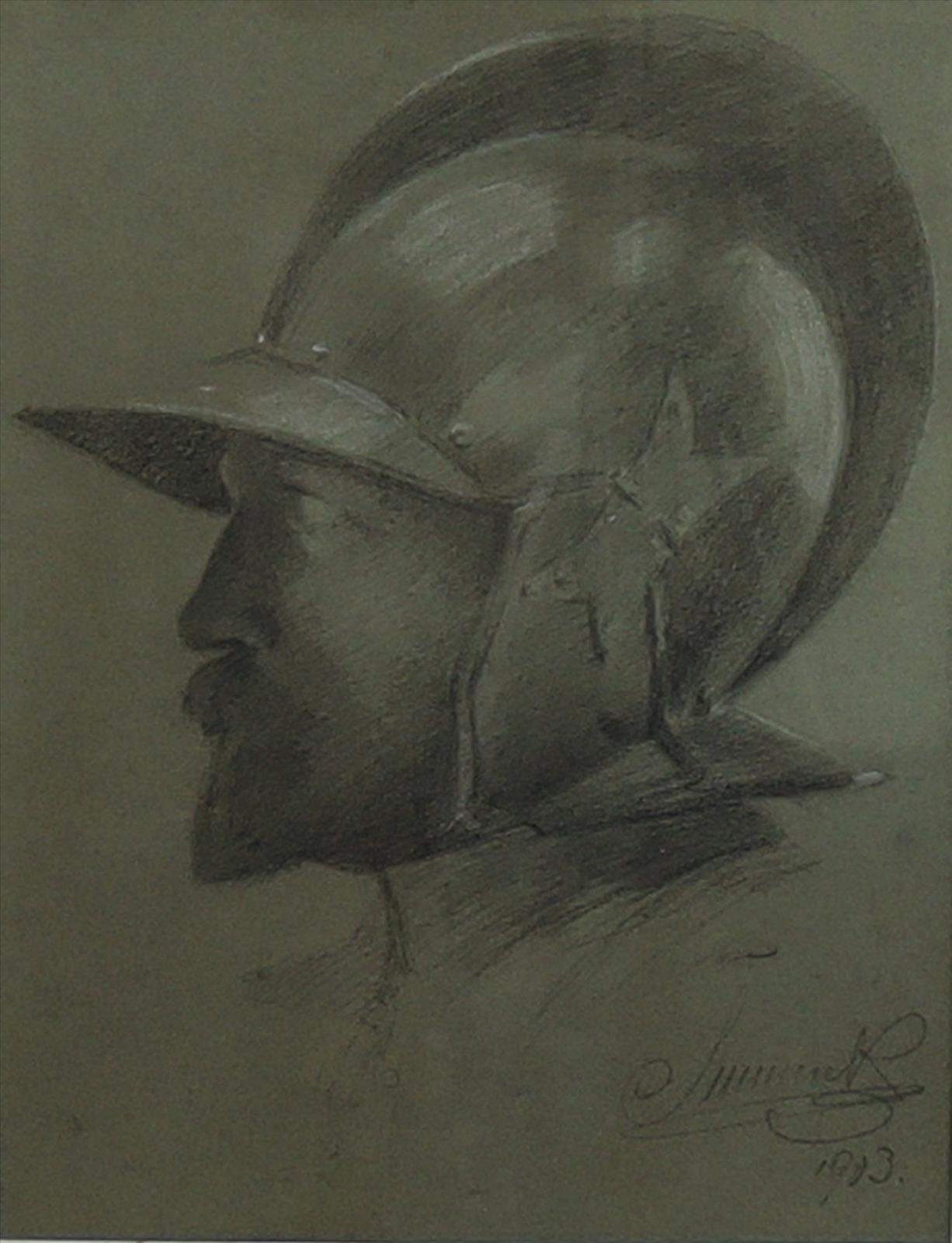
Rider with helmet

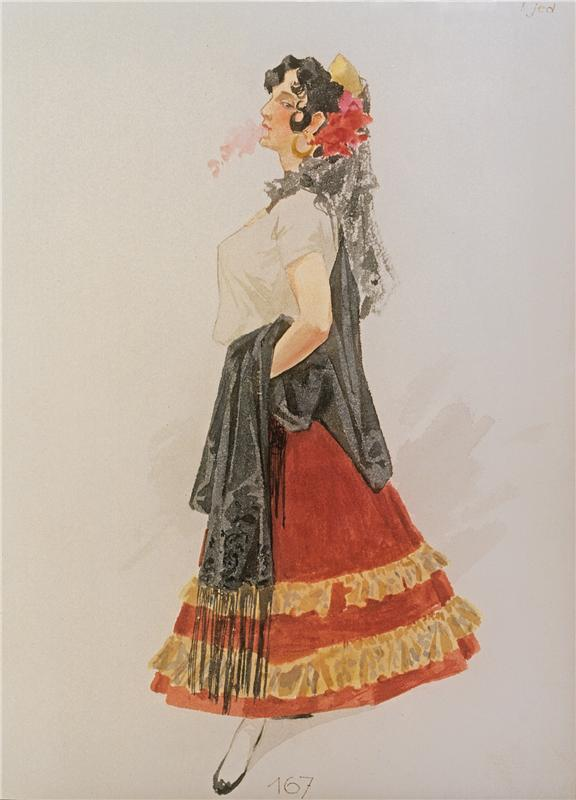
Carmen costume design (1900)

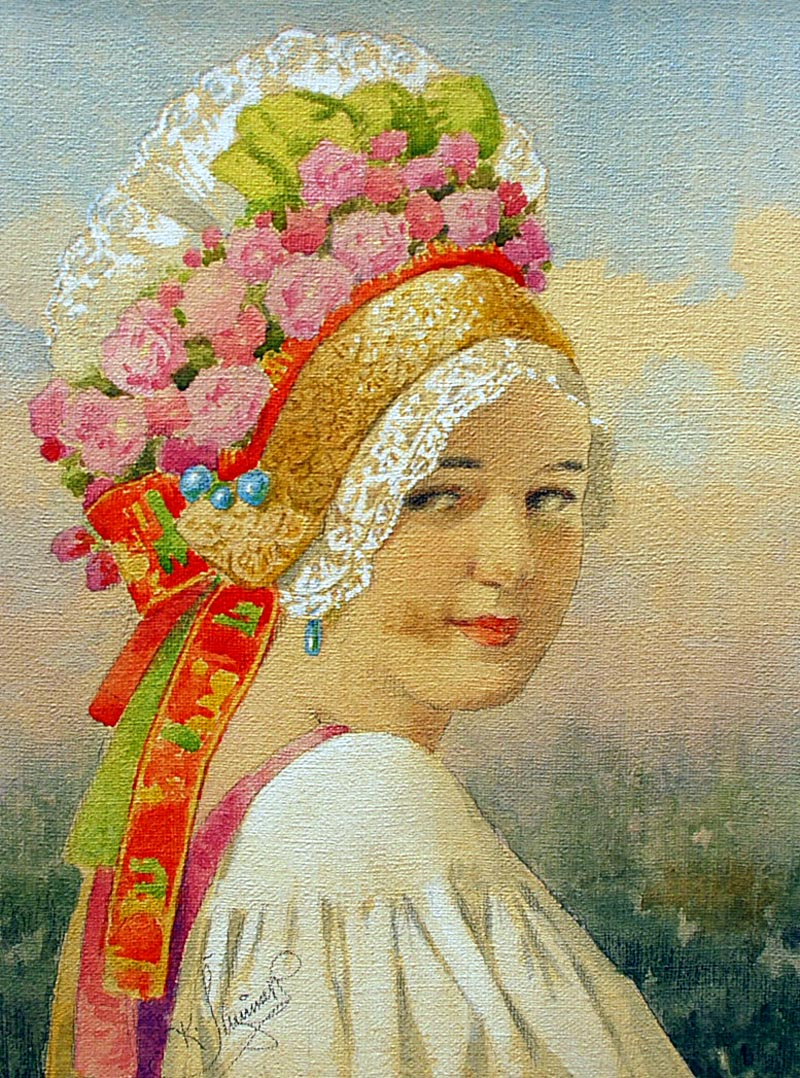
Girl in traditional costume

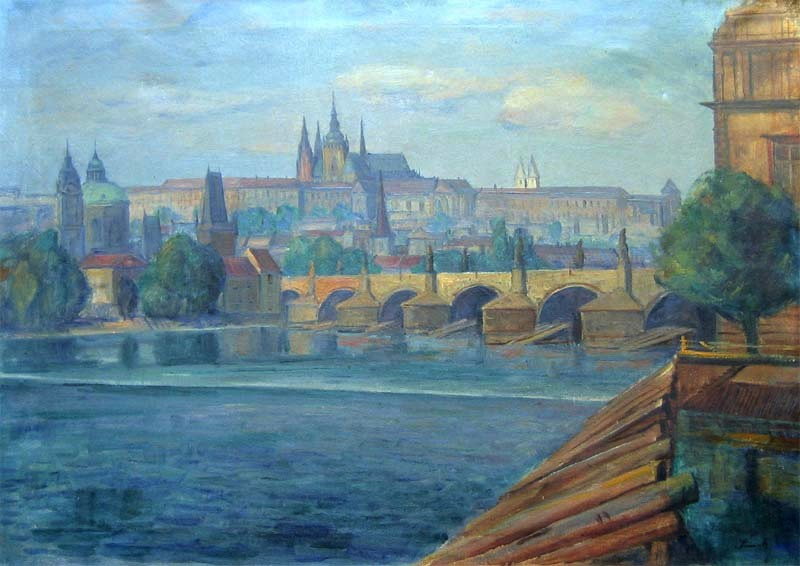
Hradčany
