= Trubín =

- Municipality
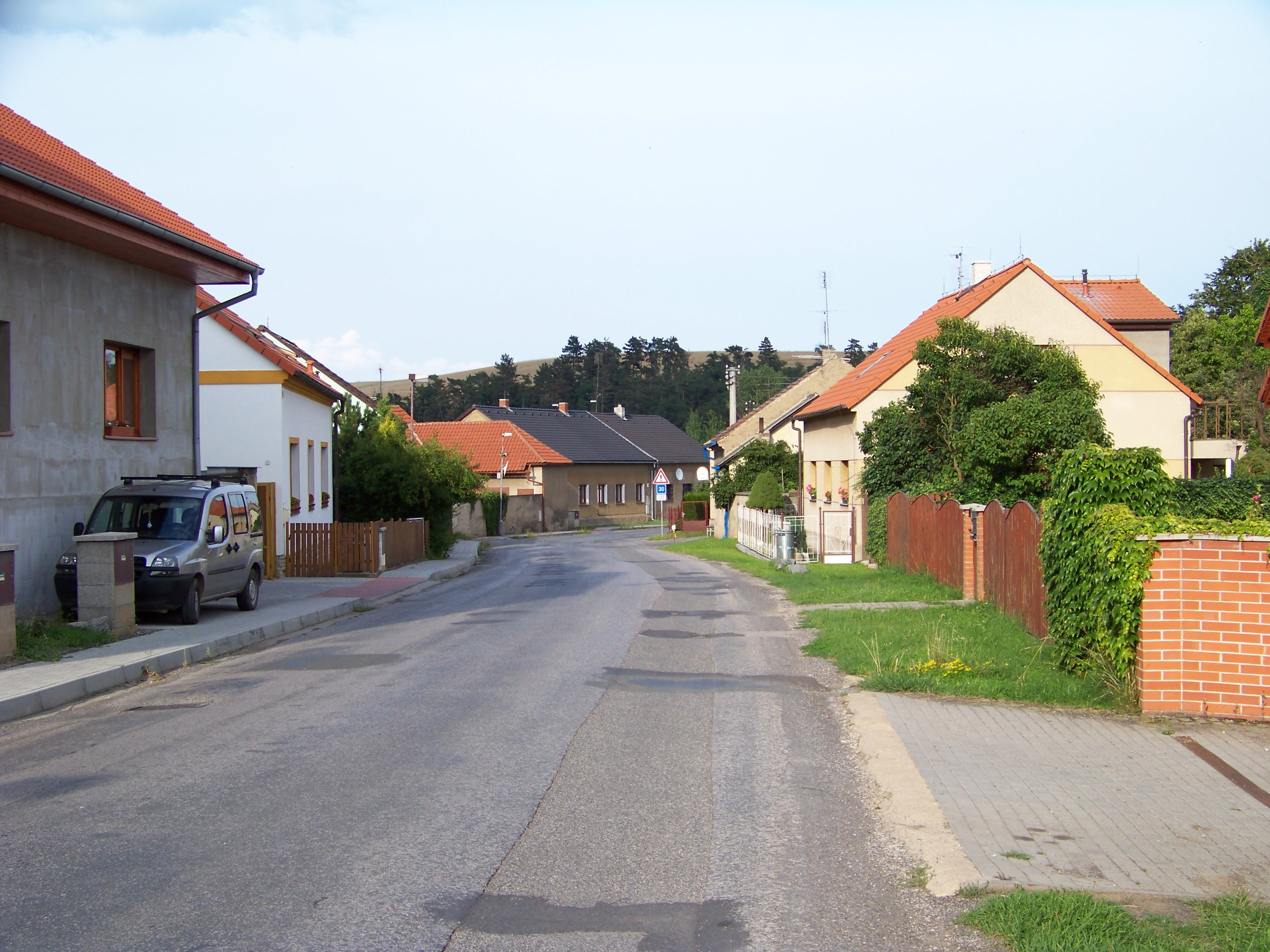
- Main street

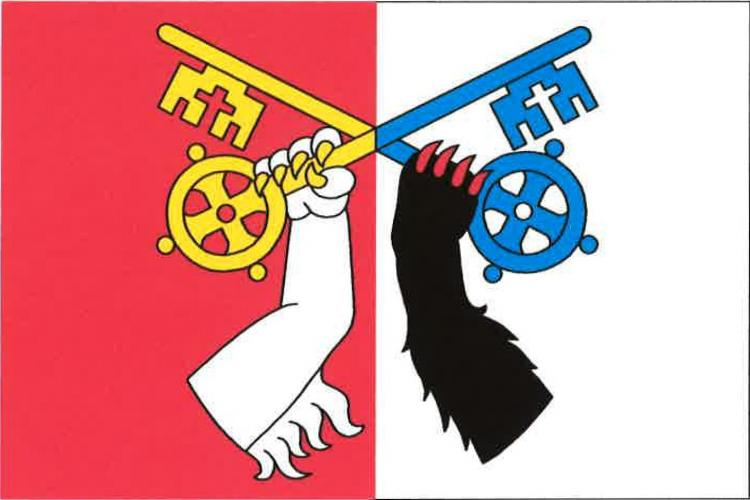
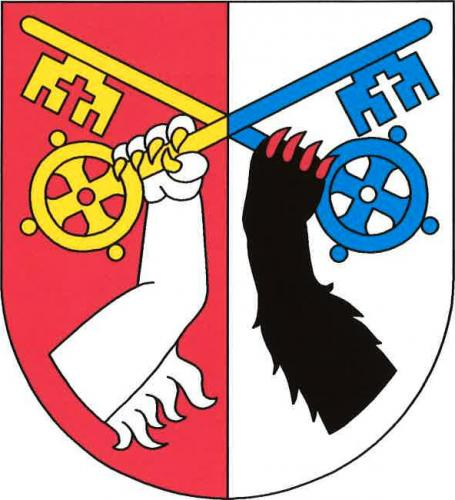
- Flag Coat of arms

- Location in the Czech Republic
- Coordinates: 49°56′38″N 14°0′8″E
- Country: Czech Republic
- Region: Central Bohemian
- District: Beroun
- First mentioned: 1125

Area
  - Total: 3.72 km^{2} (1.44 sq mi)
- Elevation: 281 m (922 ft)

Population (2026-01-01)
  - Total: 588
  - Density: 158/km^{2} (409/sq mi)
- Time zone: UTC+1 (CET)
  - Summer (DST): UTC+2 (CEST)
- Postal code: 267 01
- Website: www.trubin.cz

Trubín is a municipality and village in Beroun District in the Central Bohemian Region of the Czech Republic. It has about 600 inhabitants.

== Demographics ==
Historical population
Year	Pop.	±%
1869	222	—
1880	231	+4.1%
1890	232	+0.4%
1900	323	+39.2%
1910	379	+17.3%
1921	368	−2.9%
1930	336	−8.7%
1950	283	−15.8%
1961	236	−16.6%
1970	203	−14.0%
1980	180	−11.3%
1991	201	+11.7%
2001	204	+1.5%
2011	355	+74.0%
2021	578	+62.8%
Source: Censuses
