= Jossyp Bokschaj =

Soviet painter (1891–1975)

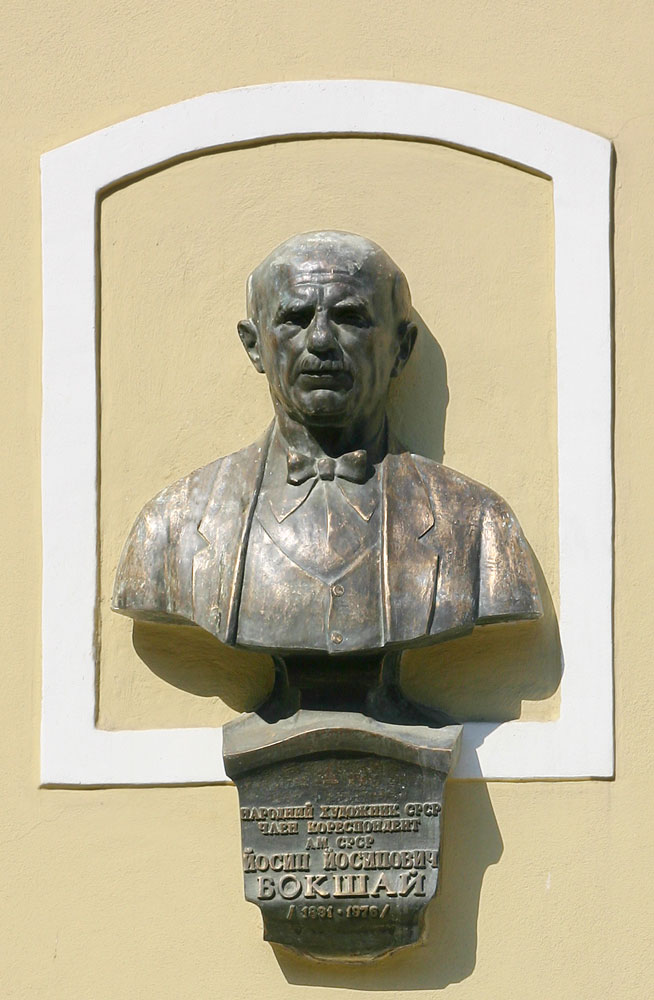
- Bust of Jossyp Bokschaj in Uzhorod, Ukraine
- Born: 1891; Kobyletska Poliana, Soviet Union
- Died: 1975 (aged 83–84); Uzhhorod, Soviet Union
- Known for: Painting

Jossyp Bokschaj (1891-1975) was a Soviet painter. Born in Kobyletska Poliana, western Ukraine, he was educated in Budapest and lived in Uzhhorod for the rest of his life. He became a People's Artist of the USSR.
