= Zadní Třebaň =

- Municipality
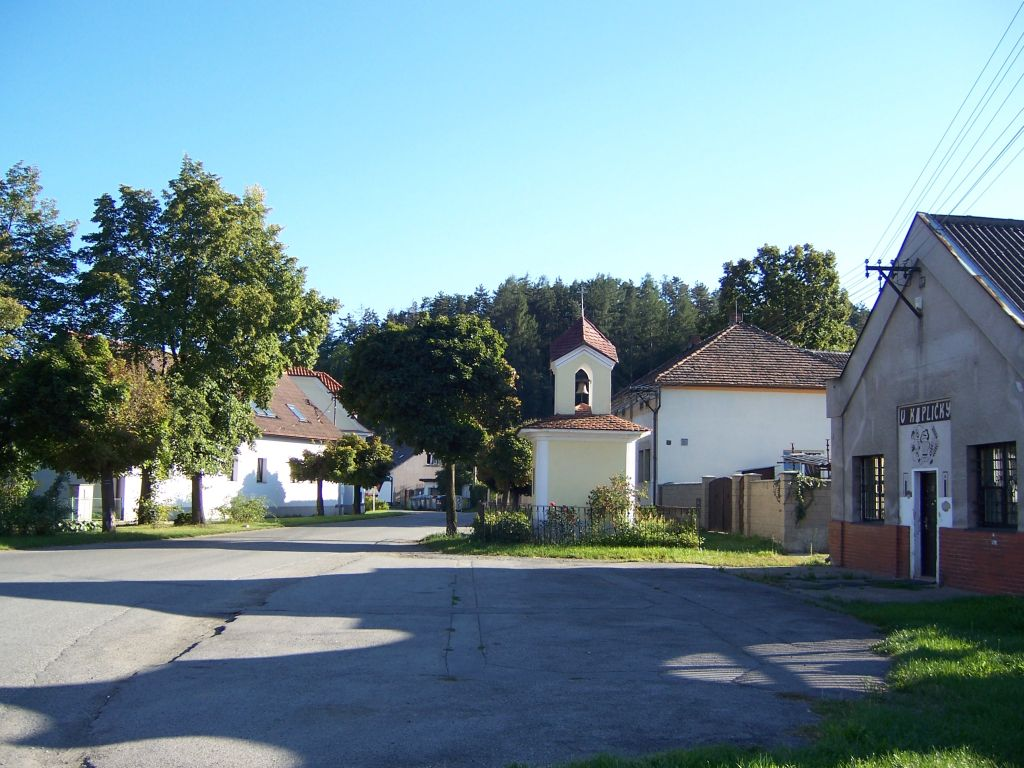
- Common with a chapel

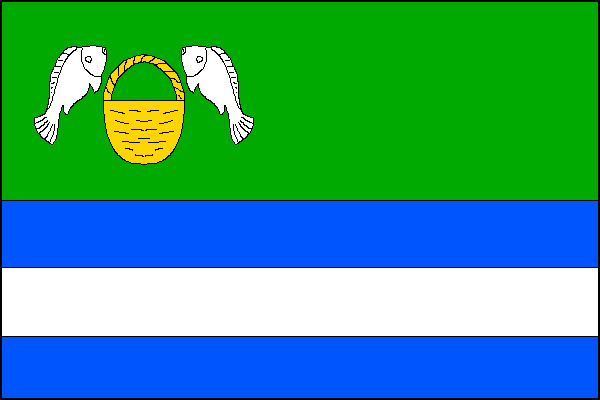
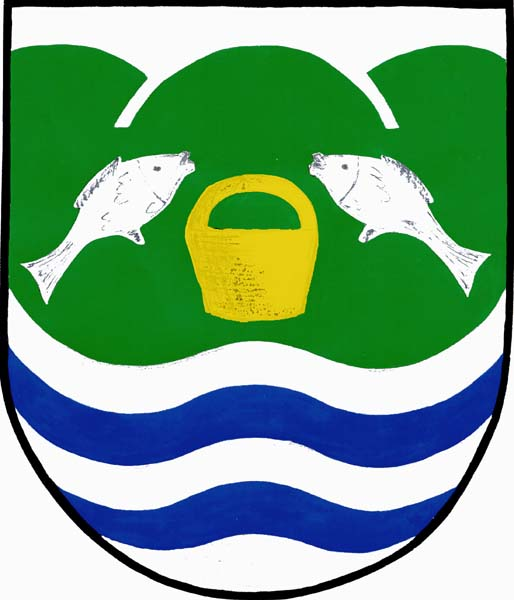
- Flag Coat of arms

- Location in the Czech Republic
- Coordinates: 49°55′5″N 14°12′29″E
- Country: Czech Republic
- Region: Central Bohemian
- District: Beroun
- First mentioned: 1000

Area
  - Total: 3.57 km^{2} (1.38 sq mi)
- Elevation: 225 m (738 ft)

Population (2026-01-01)
  - Total: 982
  - Density: 275/km^{2} (712/sq mi)
- Time zone: UTC+1 (CET)
  - Summer (DST): UTC+2 (CEST)
- Postal code: 267 29
- Website: www.zadnitreban.cz

Zadní Třebaň is a municipality and village in Beroun District in the Central Bohemian Region of the Czech Republic. It has about 1,000 inhabitants.

== Etymology ==
The name Třebaň is derived from the personal name Třeban, meaning "Třeban's (court)". The village was called Zadní Třebaň ('back Třebaň') to distinguish it from Přední Třebaň ('front Třebaň'; later renamed Hlásná Třebaň) on the opposite bank of the Berounka River. The prefix referred to the location of the village in relation to the Karlštejn Castle.

== Demographics ==
Historical population
| Year | Pop. | ±% |
|---|---|---|
| 1869 | 264 | — |
| 1880 | 273 | +3.4% |
| 1890 | 255 | −6.6% |
| 1900 | 349 | +36.9% |
| 1910 | 277 | −20.6% |
| 1921 | 367 | +32.5% |
| 1930 | 627 | +70.8% |
| 1950 | 761 | +21.4% |
| 1961 | 710 | −6.7% |
| 1970 | 652 | −8.2% |
| 1980 | 595 | −8.7% |
| 1991 | 541 | −9.1% |
| 2001 | 549 | +1.5% |
| 2011 | 757 | +37.9% |
| 2021 | 990 | +30.8% |
Source: Censuses
