= Beroun =

Town in the Czech Republic

- Town
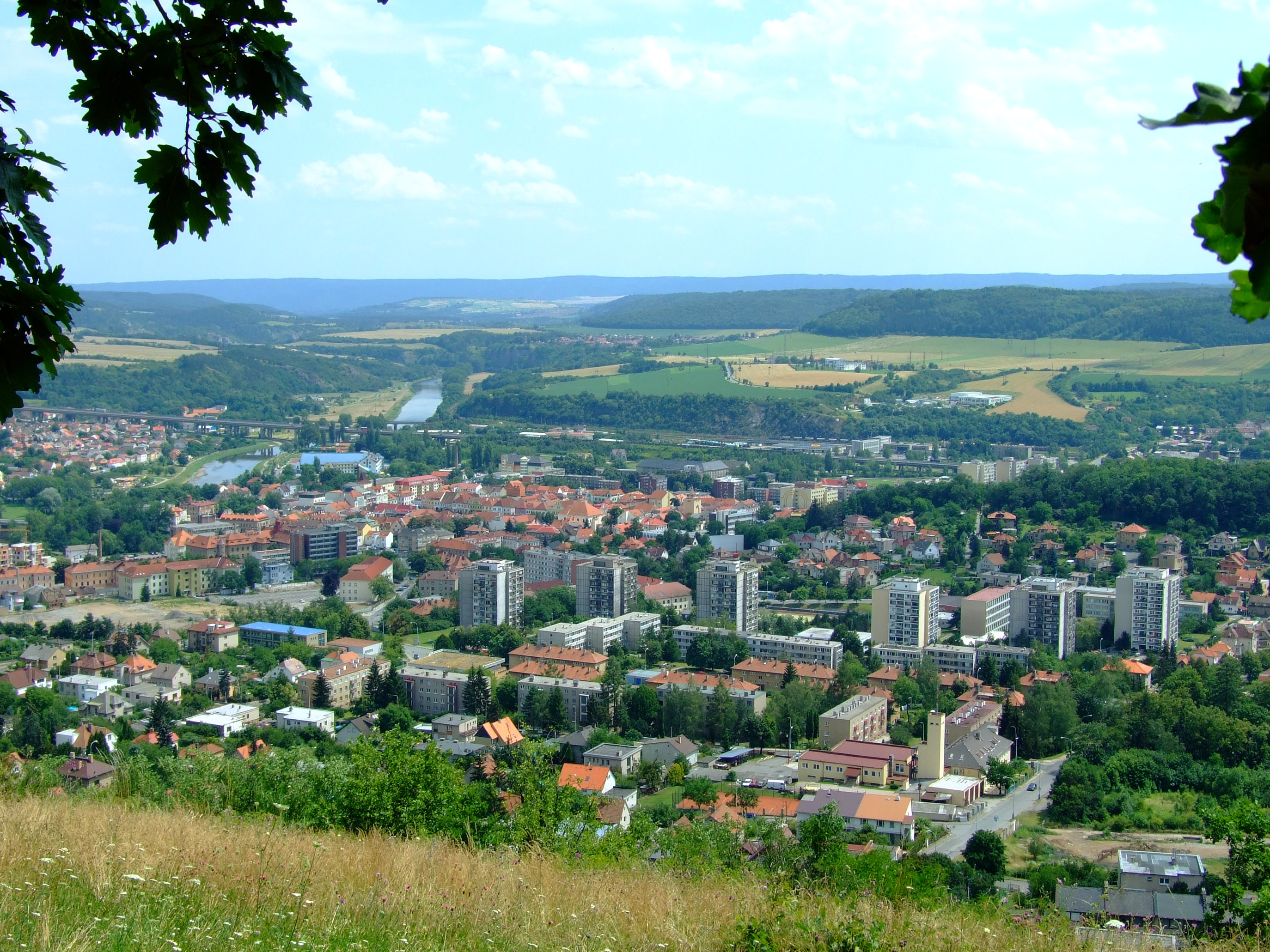
- View of Beroun

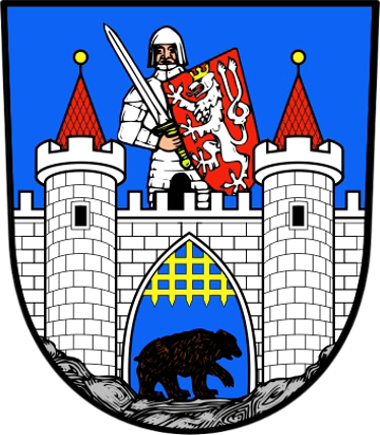
- Flag Coat of arms

- Location in the Czech Republic
- Coordinates: 49°57′51″N 14°4′26″E
- Country: Czech Republic
- Region: Central Bohemian
- District: Beroun
- First mentioned: 1265

Government
  - Mayor: Soňa Chalupová (ODS)

Area
  - Total: 31.25 km^{2} (12.07 sq mi)
- Elevation: 235 m (771 ft)

Population (2026-01-01)
  - Total: 21,744
  - Density: 695.8/km^{2} (1,802/sq mi)
- Time zone: UTC+1 (CET)
  - Summer (DST): UTC+2 (CEST)
- Postal code: 266 01
- Website: www.mesto-beroun.cz

Beroun (Czech pronunciation: [ˈbɛroun]; German: Beraun) is a town in the Central Bohemian Region of the Czech Republic. It has about 22,000 inhabitants. The town is located at the confluence of the Berounka and Litavka rivers.

Beroun creates a conurbation with Králův Dvůr, which is a former part of Beroun. The historic town centre is well preserved and is protected as an urban monument zone.

== Administrative division ==
Beroun consists of seven municipal parts (in brackets population according to the 2021 census):

- Beroun-Centrum (921)
- Beroun-Hostim (122)
- Beroun-Jarov (238)
- Beroun-Město (15,398)
- Beroun-Zavadilka (712)
- Beroun-Závodí (2,836)
- Beroun-Zdejcina (324)

== Etymology ==
The initial name of the settlement was Verona. The settlement was named after the Italian city of Verona, but it is unclear why. According to one theory, Italian merchants from Verona settled in the settlement at the time of its founding. The name was gradually distorted to Berona, Berún, Beraun and finally Beroun.

== Geography ==
Beroun is located about 26 kilometres (16 mi) southwest of Prague. It lies at the confluence of the Berounka and Litavka rivers, in the valley of the rivers. The Loděnice River flows through Beroun-Hostim in the easternmost part of the municipal territory and then joins the Berounka just outside the territory of Beroun.

The surrounding landscape is hilly. The southern part of the municipal territory, including the built-up area, lies in the Hořovice Uplands. The northern part lies in the Křivoklát Highlands. The highest point is the Děd hill at 493 m (1,617 ft) above sea level. The lowest point is the river basin of the Berounka, at 212 m (696 ft).

== History ==
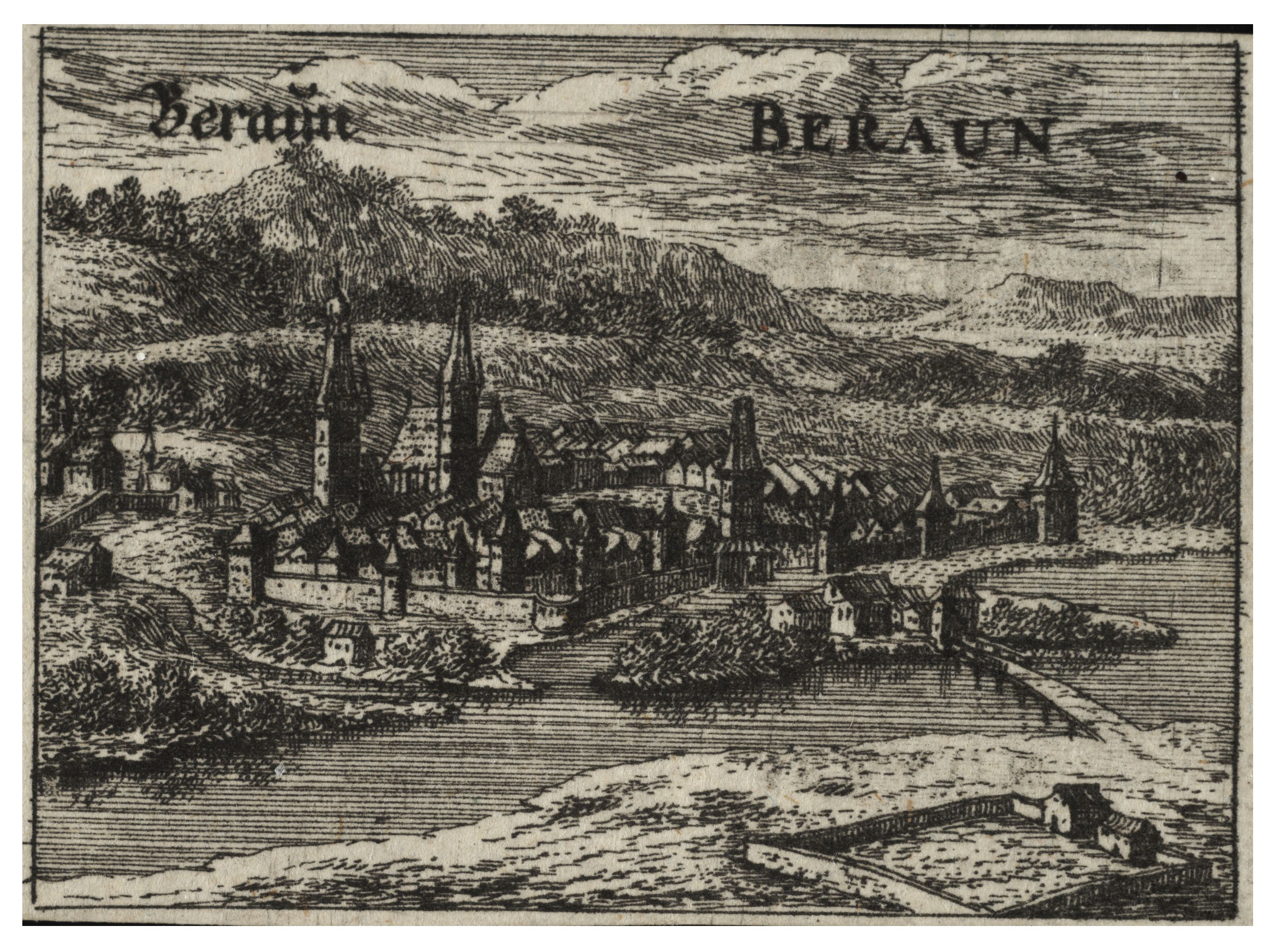
Beraun, engraving by Wenceslaus Hollar (1607–1677)

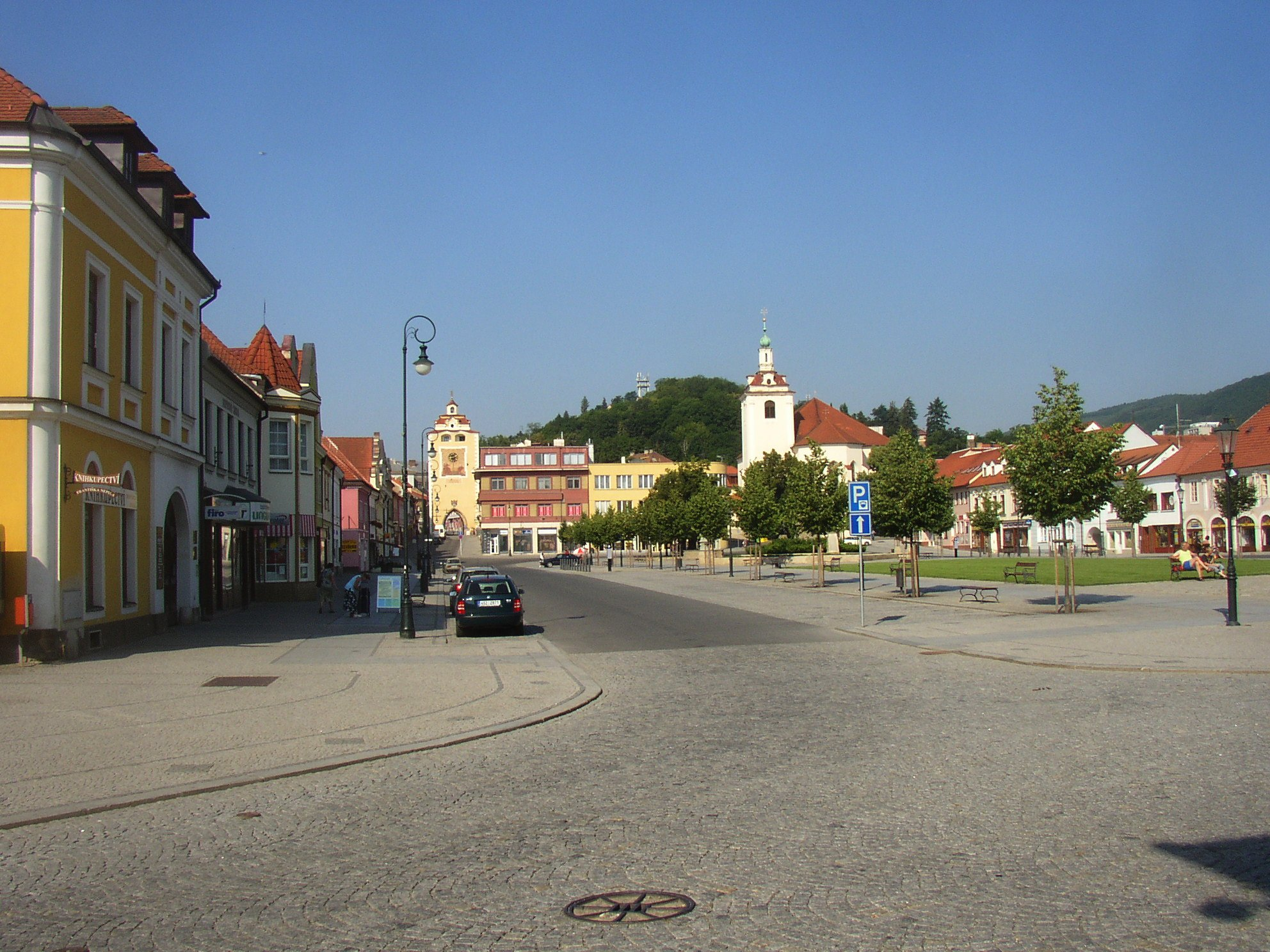
The square Husovo náměstí

=== 11th–15th centuries ===
The settlement Na Brodě (lit. 'by the ford'), which was the predecessor of Beroun, was first mentioned in a 1088 deed. The first written mention of Beroun (then called Verona) is in a deed of King Ottokar II from 1265. Ottokar II designated a strategically important place for the establishment of a settlement, from which the town of Beroun originated, that formed the shortest and easiest connection between Prague and Plzeň.

In 1295, King Wenceslaus II decided to re-settle and expand the town. At this time, the historic core of Beroun was created, which has been roughly preserved to this day. A Dominican convent was also founded. In 1303, Wenceslaus II made Beroun a royal town.

During the reign of Emperor Charles IV, the town prospered and rapidly developed. In 1421, Hussite forces under the command of Jan Žižka stormed the town and demolished the Dominican convent, and though it was retaken and devastated after the Battle of Lipany, it has remained a mainly Czech settled town since then. During the reign of King Vladislaus II (1471–1516), Beroun reached its greatest prosperity.

=== 16th–19th centuries ===
Under the rule of the House of Habsburg from 1526, the town's estates were seized. During the Thirty Years' War it was sacked in turn by the Imperial army, Saxon forces, and Swedish forces. In the First Silesian War the same fate befell it at the hands of French and Bavarian troops.

In the 18th century, Beroun became a garrison town and did not prosper again until the 1860s, with the opening of limestone quarries and iron ore mines. Beside several ironworks, Beroun became the site of textile manufacturing, and the population increased.

=== 20th–21st centuries ===
Beroun was significantly transformed during communist rule. Heavy industry was expanded, and central government policy set quotas for new flats. As Beroun is situated between two rivers in a deep valley without suitable building plots, quotas were met by demolishing historical medieval buildings and erecting prefabricated high-rise buildings. The town look was changed again in the 1980s when the D5 highway was opened, running on the bridge above the town.

Králův Dvůr, together with multiple municipalities, was joined to Beroun in 1980. In 1990, Králův Dvůr and Trubín became separate municipalities.

Since the fall of communism, the town has been revitalised. Medieval buildings have been reconstructed, and town walls have been conserved. Heavy industry left the town, significantly raising the quality of living. In the 21st century, Beroun has become a popular place to live with high population growth and with an above-average quality of environment and health care.

== Demographics ==
Historical population

Year	Pop.	±%
1869	5,167	—
1880	6,331	+22.5%
1890	7,872	+24.3%
1900	10,402	+32.1%
1910	11,906	+14.5%

Year	Pop.	±%
1921	12,107	+1.7%
1930	13,917	+15.0%
1950	13,802	−0.8%
1961	16,134	+16.9%
1970	17,805	+10.4%

Year	Pop.	±%
1980	17,387	−2.3%
1991	18,005	+3.6%
2001	17,459	−3.0%
2011	18,819	+7.8%
2021	20,551	+9.2%

Source: Censuses

== Economy ==
Beroun is home to the Tipsport.net company, which is the largest betting agency in the Czech Republic. It has more than 1,000 employees. The largest industrial employers in Beroun are Carrier Refrigeration Operation Czech Republic (manufacturer of air conditioning equipment) and Swisspearl Česká republika (manufacturer of fibre cement building materials), both with more than 250 employees.

== Transport ==
Beroun is connected via D5 motorway (part of the European route E50) with Prague and German Bundesautobahn 6 to Nuremberg.

Several railway lines run through Beroun: Prague–České Budějovice, Prague–Klatovy via Plzeň, Beroun–Český Brod, Beroun–Rakovník and Beroun–Blatná There are two train stations: Beroun and Beroun-Závodí.

== Culture ==
The Talich's Beroun international music festival has been held annually in Beroun since 1983. It is named in honour of violinist Václav Talich, who lived and died in the town.

== Sport ==
The town is represented by the ice hockey club HC Berounští Medvědi. The formerly 1st league club now plays in lower tiers. There is also the ball hockey club SK Kelti 2008.

The football clubs in the town are Český Lev Union Beroun and SK Cembrit Beroun-Závodí, both playing in lower amateur tiers.

The sports club TJ Lokomotiva Beroun is dedicated to swimming, rowing, athletics and other.

== Sights ==
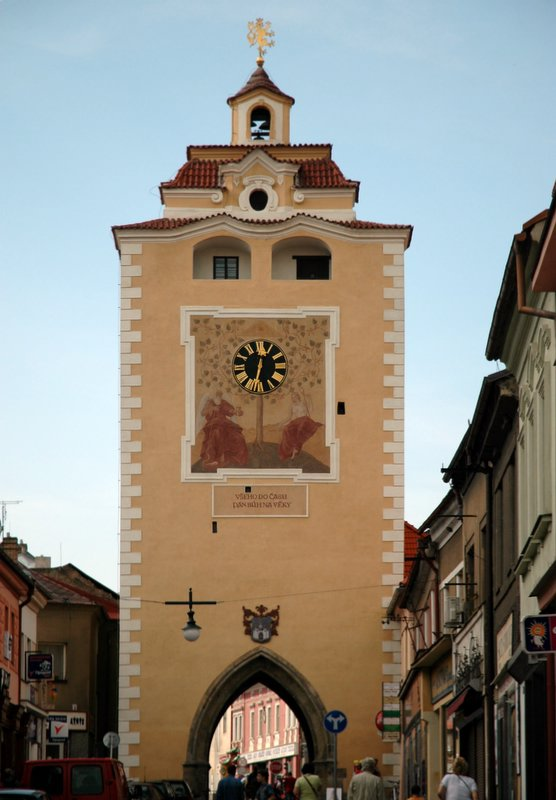
Plzeňská Gate

The square Husovo náměstí and its surrounding are the historic centre of Beroun. The square contains many valuable and well preserved houses. The town hall was built in the Renaissance style in 1560–1564.

The Church of Saint James the Great is as old as the town. It is one of the most valuable building in the town. The Church of the Annunciation of the Virgin Mary was built in 1525, after a new cemetery was established during the great plague.

The Beroun walls are an exceptional monument of a medieval fortification in Bohemia. They were built during the reign of Wenceslaus II. They surrounded the town with a total length of 1,170 metres (3,840 ft). Plzeňská Gate (also known as "Upper Gate") and Pražská Gate ("Lower Gate") were the most significant parts of town fortifications. Until 1842, the road from Plzeň to Prague passed through the gates.

In 1724, the Chapel of Our Lady of Sorrows was built.

== Notable people ==
- Josef Jungmann (1773–1847), poet and linguist; studied here
- Karla Máchová (1853–1920), women's rights activist and politician
- Karel Šimůnek (1869–1942), painter and illustrator
- Václav Talich (1883–1961), conductor; lived and died here
- Milada Špálová (1884–1963), painter
- Jiří Jeníček (1895–1963), photographer and filmmaker
- Dolly Perutz (1908–1979), American sculptor and graphic artist
- Ludmila Vachtová (1933–2020), art historian, critic and curator
- Josef Jandač (born 1968), ice hockey player and coach
- Leoš Mareš (born 1976), TV and radio presenter and singer
- Martin Růžička (born 1985), ice hockey player
- Tomáš Macháč (born 2000), tennis player
- Martin Vitík (born 2003), footballer

== Twin towns – sister cities ==
Beroun is twinned with:

- Brzeg, Poland
- Goslar, Germany

== See also ==
- Beroun, Minnesota, an unincorporated community founded by immigrants from Beroun
