= Vorel =

Vorel is a common Czech surname that derives from orel (eagle). The feminine form of the name is Vorlová. Notable people include:

- Jan Vorel (born 1978), Czech football player
- Josef Vorel (1801–1879), Czech priest and composer
- Lascăr Vorel (1879–1918), Romanian painter
- Marek Vorel (born 1977), Czech ice hockey player
- Michal Vorel (born 1975), Czech football player
- Sláva Vorlová (1894–1973), Czech composer
- Tomáš Vorel (born 1957), Czech director, scriptwriter, and actor
- Vojtěch Vorel, Czech football player
