= Josip Kodl =

Croatian architect

- Born: 8 September 1887; Zdice, Austria-Hungary
- Died: 26 September 1971 (aged 84); Split, SR Croatia, SFR Yugoslavia
- Education: Higher Technical School, Prague
- Occupation: Architect

Josip Maria Kodl (8 September 1887 – 26 September 1971) was a Croatian architect. Born in Zdice in the present-day Czech Republic, Kodl graduated from the Higher Technical School in Prague, after which he moved to Split where he would spend the remainder of his life. Kodl's work included a number of public projects, such as the Municipal House (1924), Meteorological Observatory on the Marjan (1926) and the "Manuš-Dobri" Elementary School (1930), as well as numerous private homes across Split.

Kodl was also active as a sportsperson; he was one of the founders of the HVK Gusar rowing club and an active rower himself, having competed in numerous races and state championships.
