= Josef Vorel =

Czech priest and composer (1801–1874)

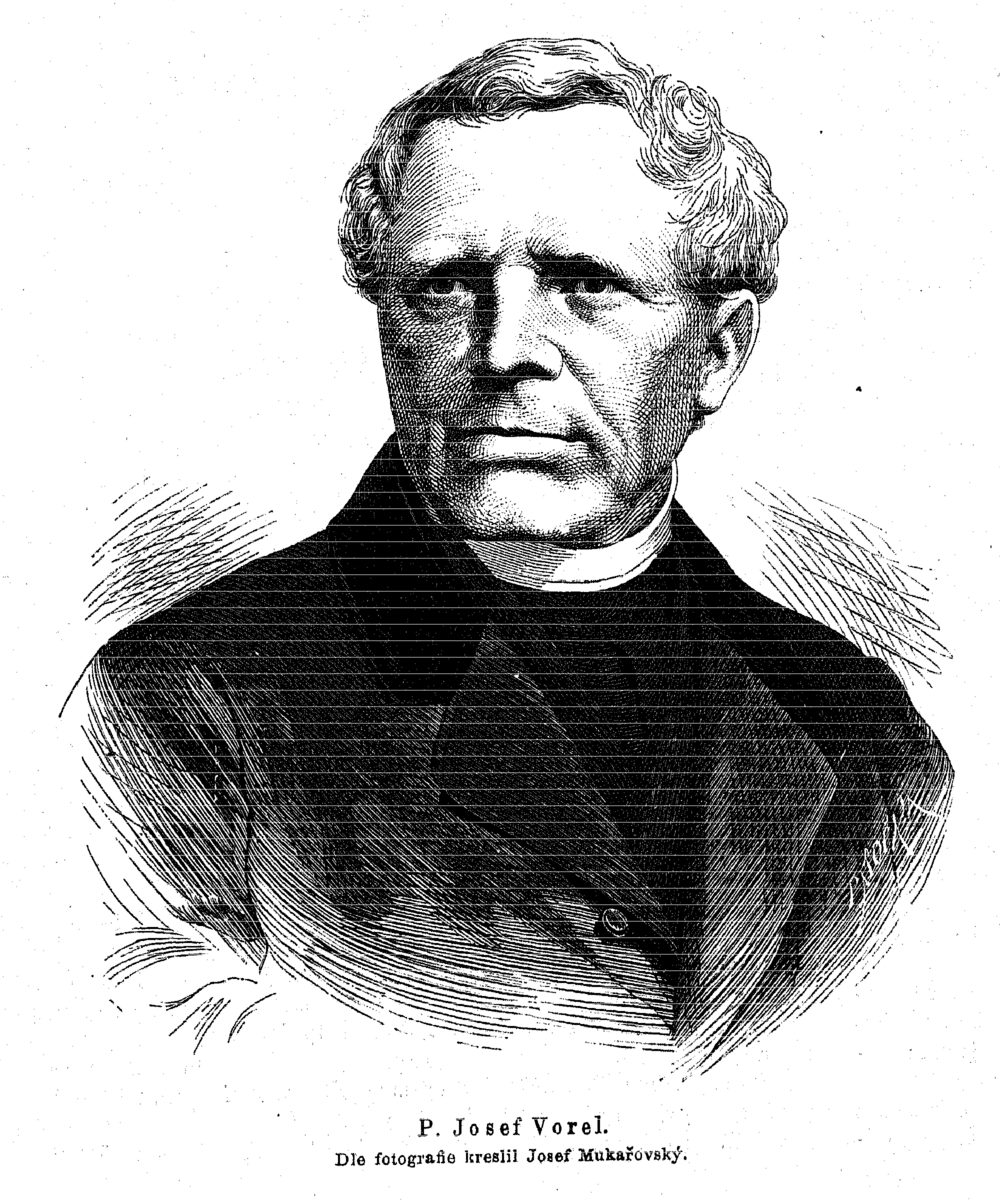
Josef Vorel portrayed by Josef Mukařovský

Josef Vorel (also Worel; 13 November 1801 – 19 December 1874) was a Czech priest and composer. He is known mainly as a composer of songs and choirs in the folk style.

== Life ==
Vorel was born in Opočno, the son of a teacher. He began his musical training at an early age. He learned the piano, viola and organ at age five. From 1813 he studied at gymnasium in Rychnov nad Kněžnou, where he founded and led a student brass orchestra. During his theological studies in Prague he met and befriended the writer and translator Karel Alois Vinařický, an important exponent of the Czech cultural scene during the period of the Czech National Revival. He occasionally attempted to compose cantatas to Vinařický's words.

Following his ordination in 1825, he briefly served as a chaplain in Cerhovice and Žebrák. In 1835 he moved to Zdice, where he served as a priest for the rest of his life. During his active career he maintained contacts with several Czech artists and poets such as Josef Jungmann, Šebestián Hněvkovský and brothers Jan and Vojtěch Nejedlý. He died in Zdice.

Vorel's musical output is influenced by the patriotic atmosphere of the Czech National Revival. Some of his songs became popular due to their nationalistic view and openly declared affection to the native country.

== Selected compositions ==
Songs

- Návrat rytíře (published in Věnec, 1836)
- Píseň letní (ibidem)
- Píseň zimní (ibidem)
- Na basu (Věnec zpěvů vlasteneckých, 1837)
- Růže tetínská or Nad Berounkou pod Tetínem (libretto by Josef Krasoslav Chmelenský, 1826, second version 1836)
- Společná or Že peníze světem vládnou (1838)
- Šestero písní (1834)
- Tři básně (1842)
- Cikánova píšťalka (published in Zlatý zpěvník I.)

Choirs

- Dva čtverozpěvy (1843)
- Tři básně (1858)
- Čtyři čtverozpěvy (1861)
- Čechie (published in Hlahol, 1864)

Singspiel

- Sládci (libretto by Karel Jaromír Erben, 1836/37)

Incidental music

- Hastroš
- Loketský zvon and Valdek (plays by Václav Kliment Klicpera)
- Husité u Naumburku

Sacred music

- Deset gradualií
- Pastorella
- Animas fidelium
- Te Deum
- Regina coeli
