= Tlustice =

- Municipality
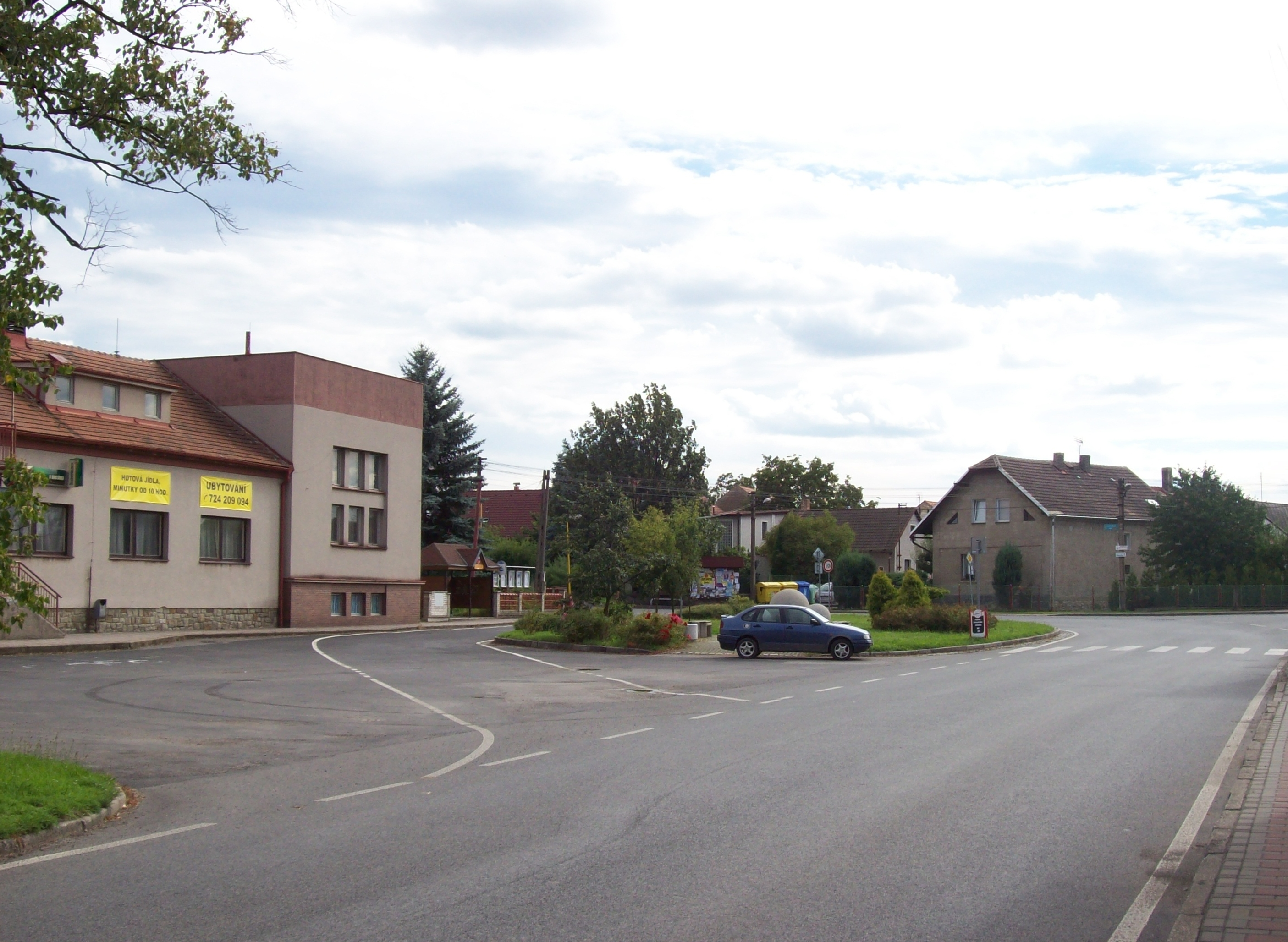
- Centre of Tlustice

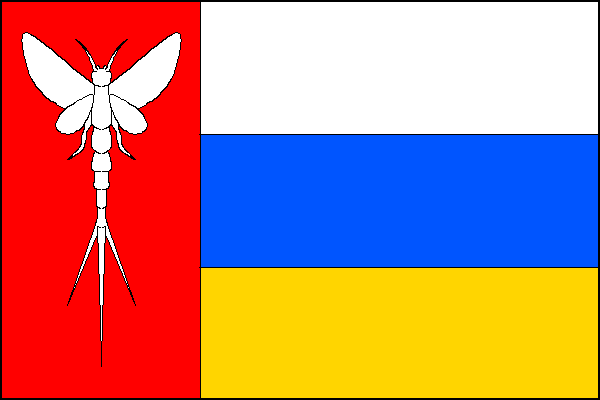
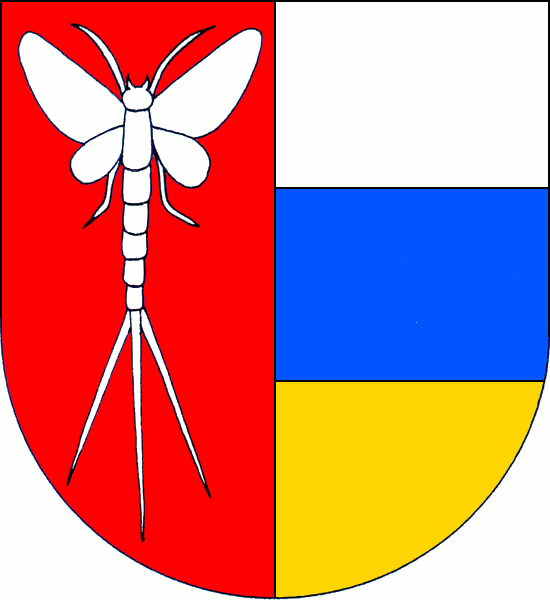
- Flag Coat of arms

- Location in the Czech Republic
- Coordinates: 49°51′0″N 13°53′8″E
- Country: Czech Republic
- Region: Central Bohemian
- District: Beroun
- First mentioned: 1320

Area
  - Total: 4.09 km^{2} (1.58 sq mi)
- Elevation: 374 m (1,227 ft)

Population (2026-01-01)
  - Total: 1,124
  - Density: 275/km^{2} (712/sq mi)
- Time zone: UTC+1 (CET)
  - Summer (DST): UTC+2 (CEST)
- Postal code: 268 01
- Website: www.tlustice.cz

Tlustice is a municipality and village in Beroun District in the Central Bohemian Region of the Czech Republic. It has about 1,100 inhabitants.

== Etymology ==
The name is derived either from the Czech word tlustý (i.e. 'fat') or from the personal name Tlustý, meaning "the village of Tlustý's people".

== Geography ==
Tlustice is located about 17 kilometres (11 mi) southwest of Beroun and 40 km (25 mi) southwest of Prague. It lies in the Hořovice Uplands. The highest point is the hill Tlustický vršek at 402 m (1,319 ft) above sea level.

== History ==
The first written mention of Tlustice is from 1320, when King John of Bohemia donated the village to Zbyněk Zajíc (later known as Zbyněk Zajíc of Hazmburk), who annexed the village to his Žebrák estate. In 1336, Zbyněk Zajíc gave the Žebrák estate to the royal chamber in exchange for another estate. Until 1557, the estate with the Tlustice village was fiefed to various noblemen. In 1557, it was bought by the Lobkowicz family.

In 1607, the royal chamber confiscated the estate to the Lobkowiczs. In 1611, Jan Litvín Kavka of Říčany bought Tlustice and annexed it to the Hořovice estate. As a result of the Bohemian Revolt, Jan Kavka's properties were confiscated in 1622 and the Hořovice estate was acquired by the Martinic family.

== Demographics ==
Historical population

Year	Pop.	±%
1869	371	—
1880	381	+2.7%
1890	434	+13.9%
1900	503	+15.9%
1910	605	+20.3%

Year	Pop.	±%
1921	652	+7.8%
1930	766	+17.5%
1950	723	−5.6%
1961	671	−7.2%
1970	741	+10.4%

Year	Pop.	±%
1980	758	+2.3%
1991	739	−2.5%
2001	807	+9.2%
2011	1,009	+25.0%
2021	1,043	+3.4%

Source: Censuses

== Transport ==
The D5 motorway from Prague to Plzeň runs through the municipality.

== Sights ==
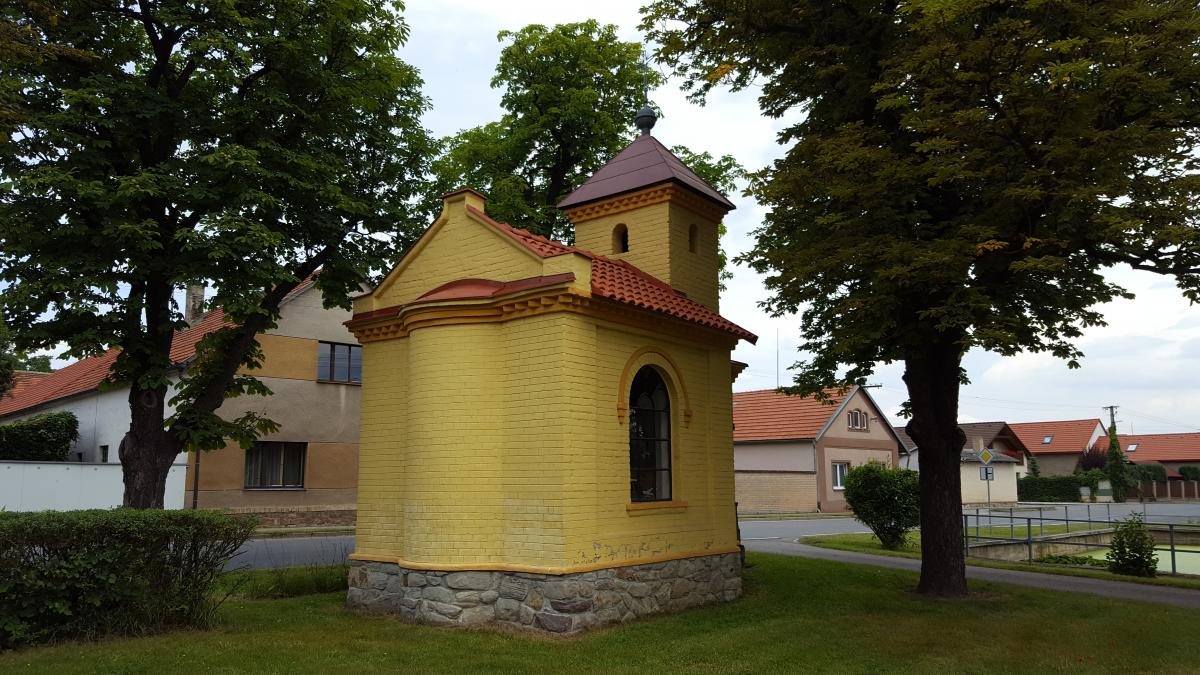
Chapel in the centre of Tlustice

There are no protected cultural monuments in the municipality. A landmark is the chapel in the centre of Tlustice.
