= Nejedlý =

Nejedlý (feminine Nejedlá) is a Czech surname. Its literal meaning is "inedible". Notable people include:

- Arnošt Nejedlý, Czech athlete
- Jana Nejedly, Czech-Canadian tennis player
- John A. Nejedly, American politician
- Martina Nejedly, Czech-Canadian tennis player
- Oldřich Nejedlý, Czech footballer
- Vojtěch Nejedlý, Czech writer
- Zdeněk Nejedlý, Czech musicologist and communist politician
