= Bavoryně =

- Municipality
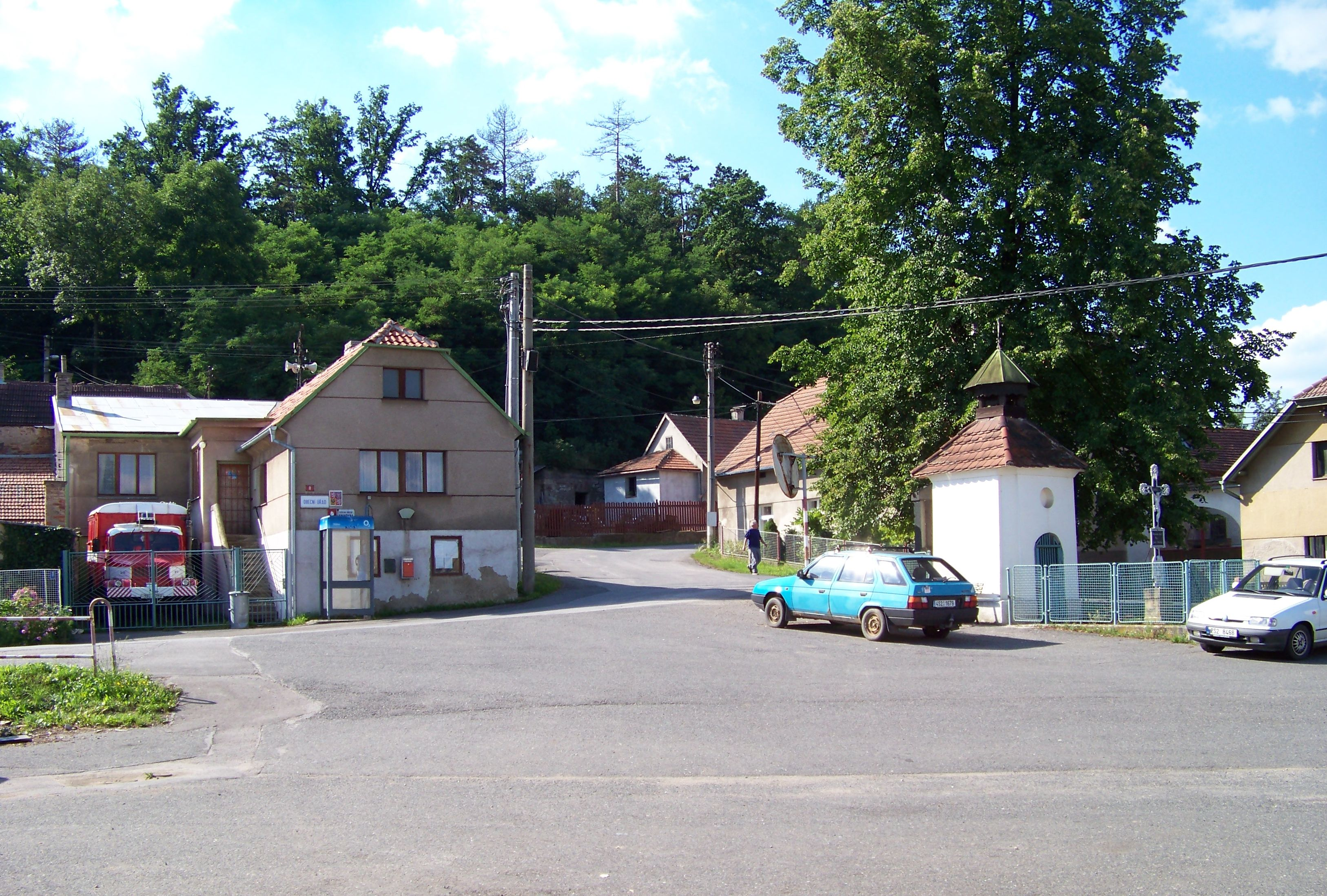
- Centre of Bavoryně

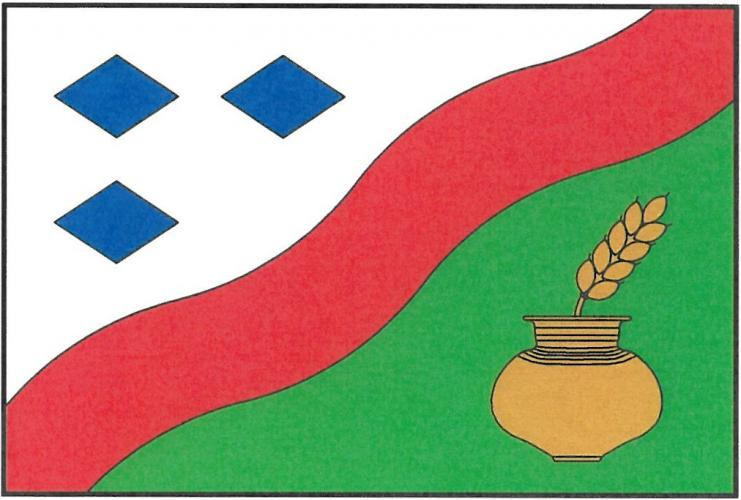
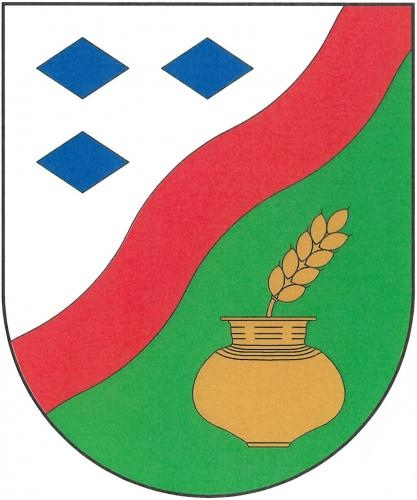
- Flag Coat of arms

- Location in the Czech Republic
- Coordinates: 49°53′45″N 13°57′40″E
- Country: Czech Republic
- Region: Central Bohemian
- District: Beroun
- First mentioned: 1088

Area
  - Total: 2.22 km^{2} (0.86 sq mi)
- Elevation: 268 m (879 ft)

Population (2026-01-01)
  - Total: 454
  - Density: 205/km^{2} (530/sq mi)
- Time zone: UTC+1 (CET)
  - Summer (DST): UTC+2 (CEST)
- Postal code: 267 51
- Website: www.bavoryne.cz

Bavoryně is a municipality and village in Beroun District in the Central Bohemian Region of the Czech Republic. It has about 500 inhabitants.

== Administrative division ==
Bavoryně consists of five municipal parts (in brackets population according to the 2021 census):

- Bavoryně (228)
- Na Lhotkách (46)
- Pod Průhony (29)
- Průmyslová zóna (0)
- U Vodojemu (96)

== Etymology ==
The name Bavoryně is derived from the personal name Bavor, meaning "Bavor's village". Until the 13th century, the village was called Obryně ("Obr's village").

== Geography ==
Bavoryně is located about 10 kilometres (6 mi) southwest of Beroun and 35 km (22 mi) southwest of Prague. It lies in the Hořovice Uplands. The stream Červený potok flows through the municipality.

== History ==
There was a Slavic settlement on the site of Bavoryně around 872, but it later disappeared. Bavoryně was then founded probably in the second half of the 11th century. The first written mention of Bavoryně is from 1088, under its old name Obryně. From 1336 to 1437, the village was owned by the town of Beroun. After that it was owned by various lesser noblemen.

In 1850, Bavoryně became a municipal part of Zdice. From 1889, it was a separate municipality. In 1945–1948, the German-speaking population was expelled. From 1980 to 1990, it was again a part of Zdice, and since 1990, it has been separate.

== Demographics ==
Historical population

Year	Pop.	±%
1869	222	—
1880	240	+8.1%
1890	235	−2.1%
1900	234	−0.4%
1910	295	+26.1%

Year	Pop.	±%
1921	277	−6.1%
1930	362	+30.7%
1950	253	−30.1%
1961	233	−7.9%
1970	217	−6.9%

Year	Pop.	±%
1980	188	−13.4%
1991	151	−19.7%
2001	169	+11.9%
2011	212	+25.4%
2021	399	+88.2%

Source: Censuses

== Economy ==
In the northern part of Bavoryně is a small industrial zone.

== Transport ==
The D5 motorway from Prague to Plzeň runs along the northern municipal border.

== Sights ==
There are no protected cultural monuments in the municipality. A landmark of the centre of Bavoryně is a small chapel.
