= Žebrák =

- Town
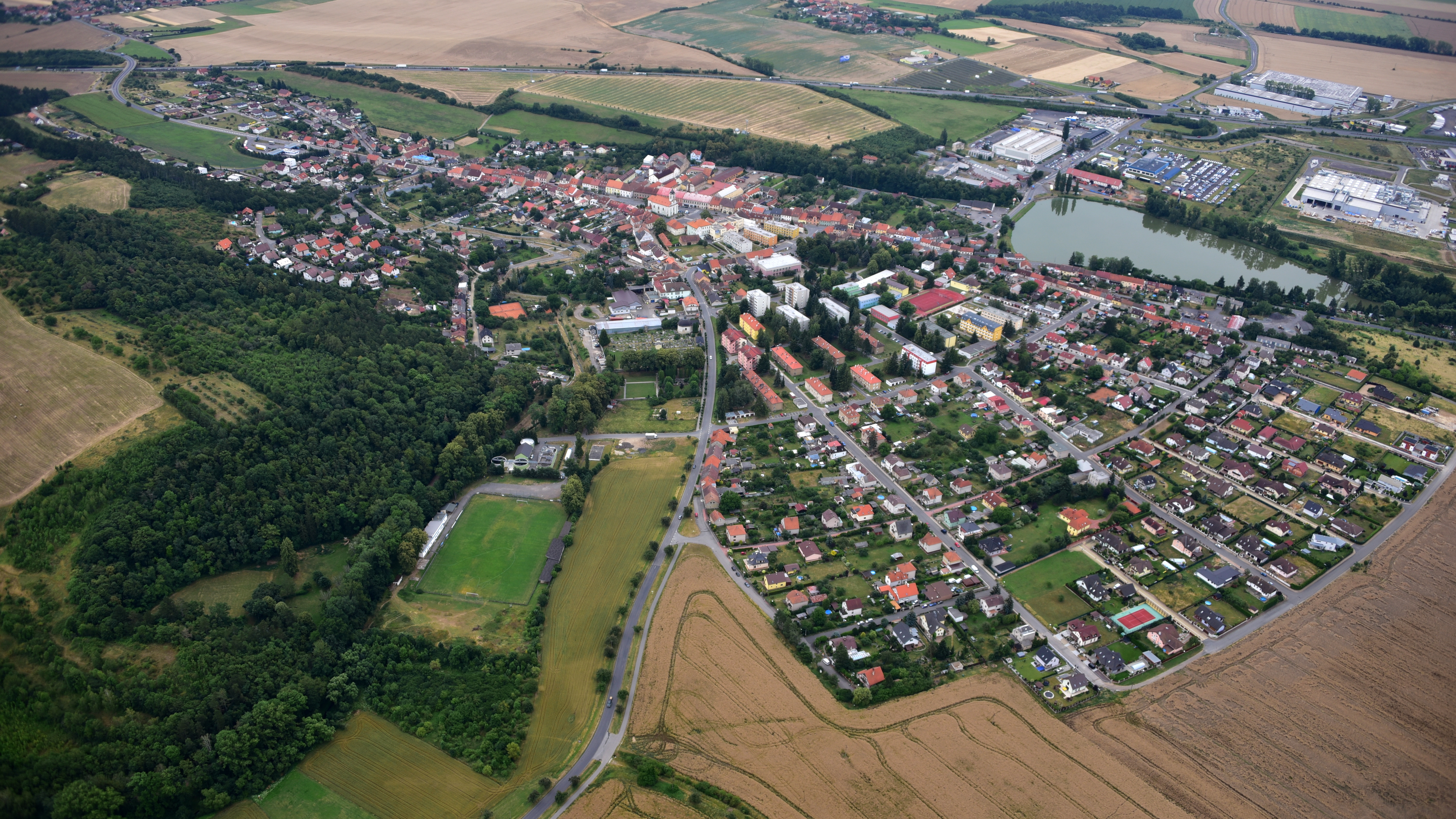
- Aerial view from the northwest

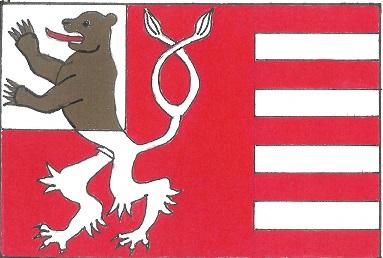
- Flag

- Location in the Czech Republic
- Coordinates: 49°52′33″N 13°53′51″E
- Country: Czech Republic
- Region: Central Bohemian
- District: Beroun
- First mentioned: 1286

Government
  - Mayor: Pavel Horázný

Area
  - Total: 8.51 km^{2} (3.29 sq mi)
- Elevation: 342 m (1,122 ft)

Population (2026-01-01)
  - Total: 2,243
  - Density: 264/km^{2} (683/sq mi)
- Time zone: UTC+1 (CET)
  - Summer (DST): UTC+2 (CEST)
- Postal codes: 267 51, 267 53
- Website: www.zebrak.cz

Žebrák (Czech pronunciation: [ˈʒɛbraːk]) is a town in Beroun District in the Central Bohemian Region of the Czech Republic. It has about 2,200 inhabitants.

== Administrative division ==
Žebrák consists of two municipal parts (in brackets population according to the 2021 census):

- Žebrák (2,087)
- Sedlec (95)

== Etymology ==
The name is derived from the personal name Žebrák. The word žebrák means 'beggar' in Czech.

== Geography ==
Žebrák is located about 14 kilometres (9 mi) southwest of Beroun and 37 km (23 mi) southwest of Prague. It lies mostly in the Hořovice Uplands, the northern part of the municipal territory extends into the Křivoklát Highlands and into the Křivoklátsko Protected Landscape Area. The highest point is at 410 m (1,345 ft) above sea level. The stream Stroupínský potok flows through the town. It supplies two fishponds in the Žebrák area, called Žebrácký rybník and Radost.

== History ==
The first written mention of Žebrák is from 1280, but it was probably founded in the second half of the 12th century. It became a busy marketplace on a trade route from Prague to Plzeň and Bavaria. In 1396, it was promoted to a town by King Wenceslaus IV. The greatest development occurred in the 16th century. In the second half of the 19th century, Žebrák was industrialised.

== Demographics ==
Historical population

Year	Pop.	±%
1869	1,872	—
1880	1,745	−6.8%
1890	1,780	+2.0%
1900	1,783	+0.2%
1910	1,927	+8.1%

Year	Pop.	±%
1921	1,714	−11.1%
1930	1,614	−5.8%
1950	1,484	−8.1%
1961	1,606	+8.2%
1970	1,585	−1.3%

Year	Pop.	±%
1980	1,934	+22.0%
1991	1,811	−6.4%
2001	1,863	+2.9%
2011	2,173	+16.6%
2021	2,182	+0.4%

Source: Censuses

== Transport ==
The D5 motorway from Prague to Plzeň runs through the municipal territory.

== Sights ==
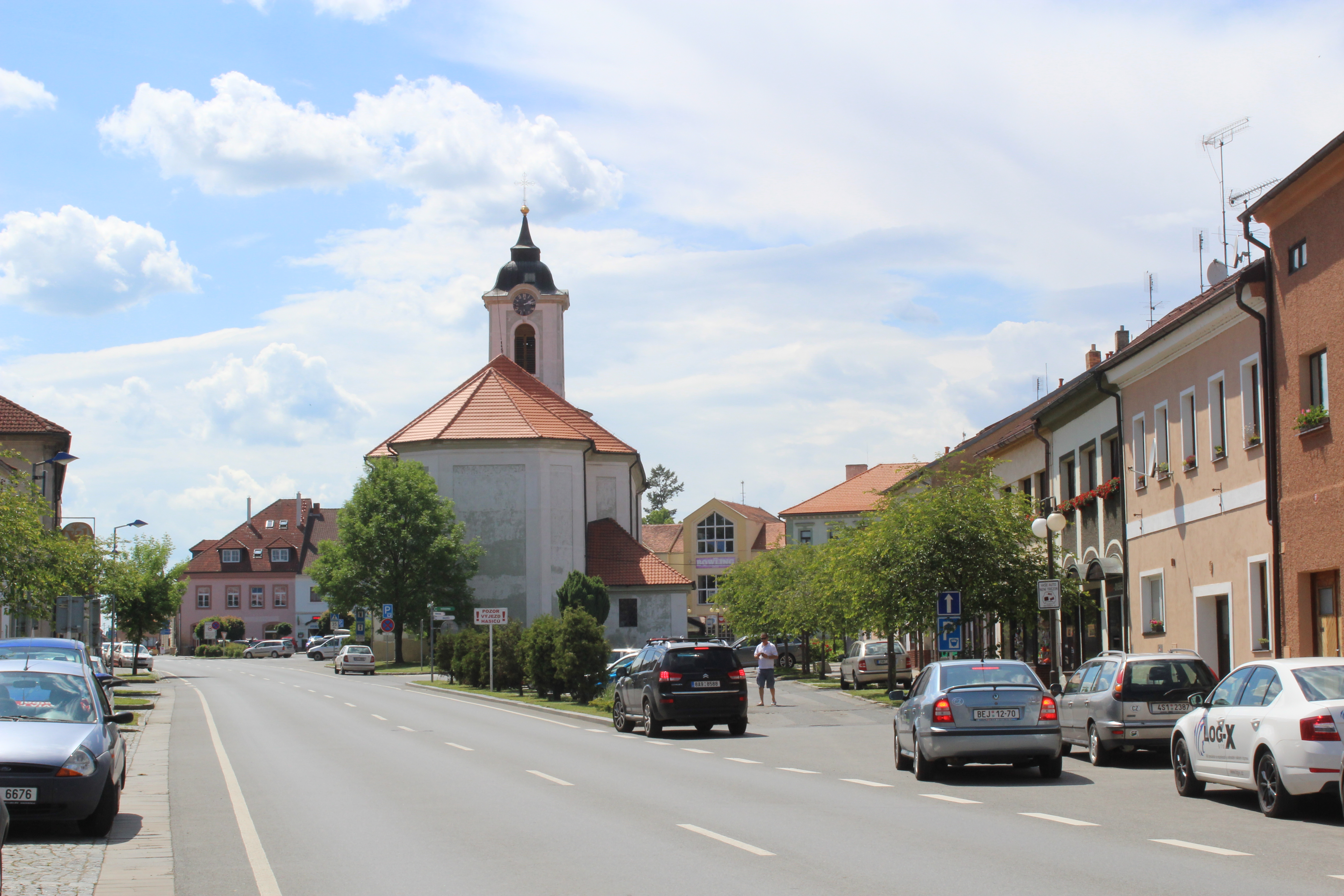
Town square with the Church of Saint Lawrence

The main landmark of the town centre is the Church of Saint Lawrence. It was built in the late Baroque style in 1780–1788, when it replaced an old church from the 14th century.

The second church is the Church of Saint Roch. This Baroque cemetery church dates from the 18th century.

Žebrák shares its name with the nearby Žebrák Castle, however, this castle is located in the territory of neighbouring Točník.

== Notable people ==
- Vojtěch Nejedlý (1772–1844), writer
- Oldřich Nejedlý (1909–1990), footballer

== Honours ==
On 14 May 2021, asteroid 131181 Žebrák, discovered by astronomers Petr Pravec and Lenka Kotková at Ondřejov Observatory in 2001, was named by the Working Group for Small Bodies Nomenclature after the town.
