= Žebrák Castle =

Coordinates: 49°53′14″N 13°52′53″E

- hrad Žebrák
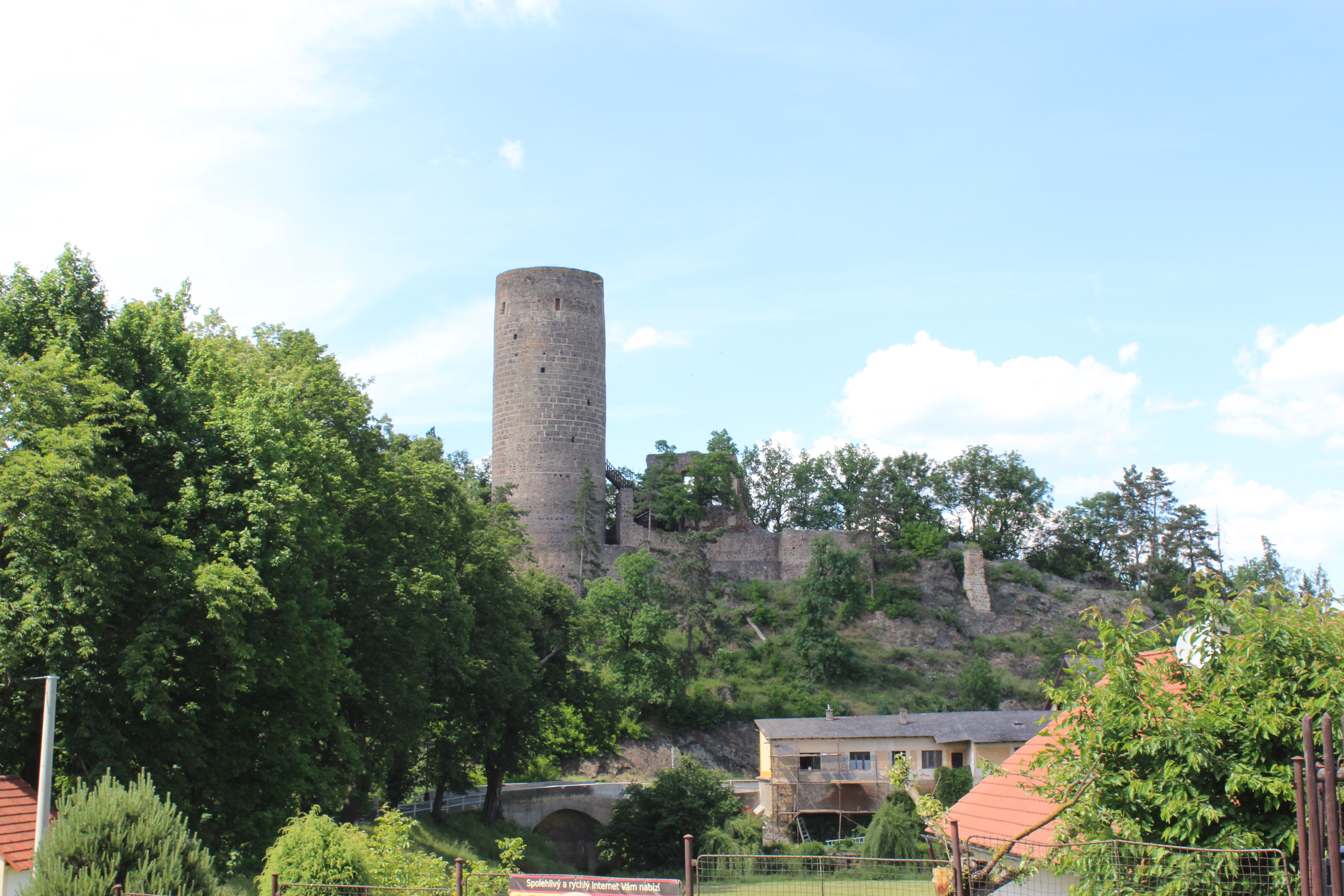
- General view

- Location within Czech Republic

General information
- Type: Medieval castle
- Location: Točník, Central Bohemian Region, Czech Republic
- Elevation: 344 m (1,129 ft)

Žebrák Castle (Czech: hrad Žebrák) is a castle ruin in the Central Bohemian Region of the Czech Republic. It is located in the municipality of Točník in the Beroun District, near the eponymous town of Žebrák. It was built by the Zajíc family. The two castles, Točník and Žebrák, make up a picturesque couple, standing almost right next to each other. Together they are protected as one national cultural monument.

== History ==
The castle was built in the second half of the 13th century by Oldřich Zajíc III, but the Zajíc family soon moved elsewhere and sold the castle to the king. In 1336, the House of Luxembourg acquired Žebrák and in 1346, John Henry started renovating it. He later gave the castle to Charles IV, who became the Holy Roman Emperor shortly afterwards. Charles' son Wenceslaus IV liked the castle very much, but after the large fire in 1395, he built a more strategically positioned castle above it. During the Hussite Wars, the Hussite army unsuccessfully besieged Žebrák and Točník and then proceeded to burn down the towns Točník and Hořovice. In 1532, another fire struck the castle, but this time, nobody bothered renovating it. In the year 1923, the castle was sold to the Czech Association of Tourists for 8,000 CSK and now it belongs to the state.
