= Točník Castle =

Coordinates: 49°53′13″N 13°53′00″E

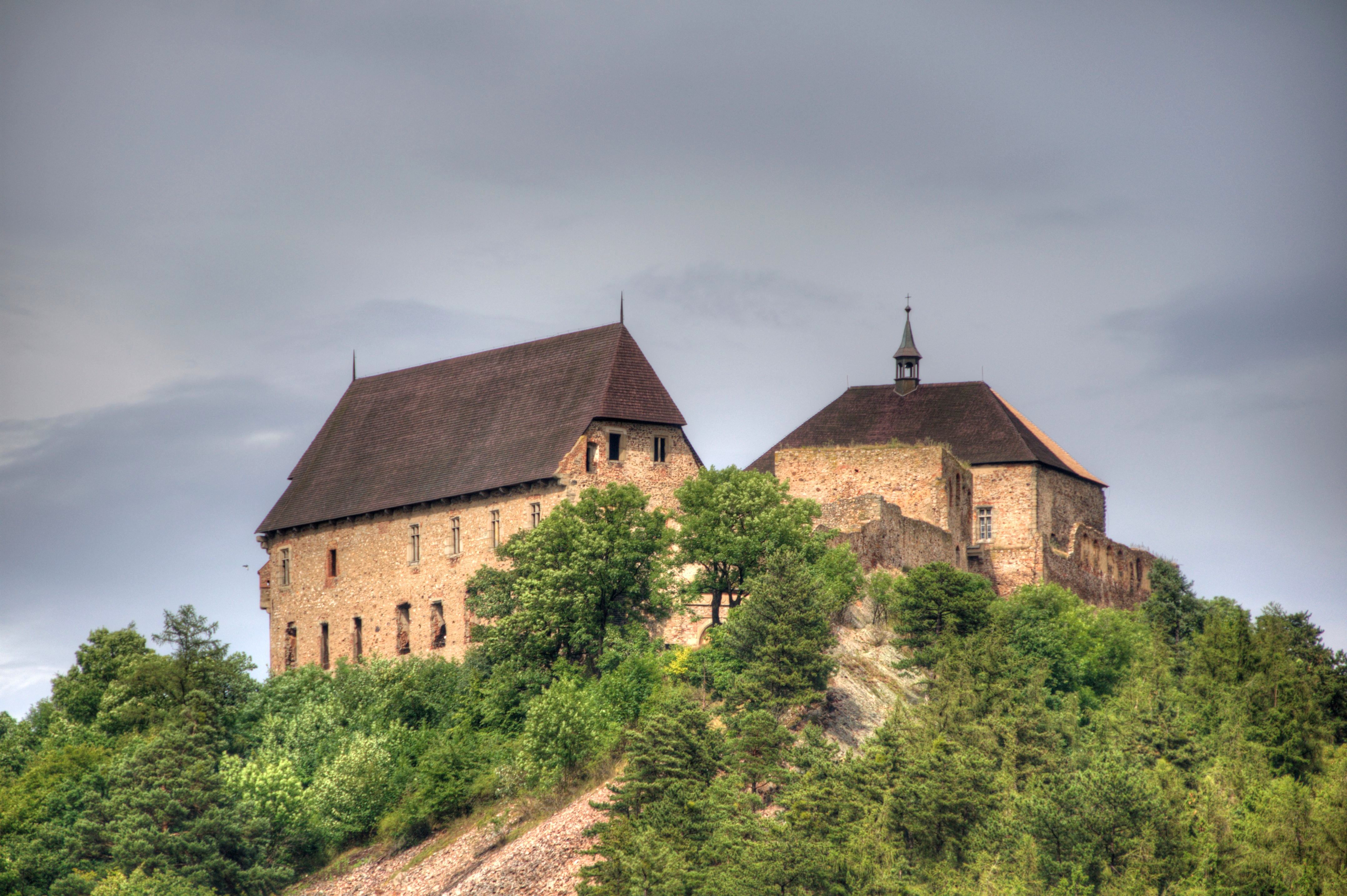
Točník Castle

Točník Castle (Czech: hrad Točník) is a castle ruin in the Central Bohemian Region of the Czech Republic. It is located in the municipality of Točník in the Beroun District. It was built during the reign of Wenceslaus IV at the end of the 14th century above the already existing castle Žebrák as his private residence. The two castles, Točník and Žebrák, make up a picturesque couple, standing almost right next to each other. Together they are protected as one national cultural monument.

== History ==
The area where the castle stands was inhabited by people two thousand years ago, but it was not until the 14th century when the Bohemian and German King Wenceslaus IV decided to build his residence there. The castle Točník was built after the large fire at the castle Žebrák, which showed how unsafe it was for the king and how its position was not strategic.

The castle was built on a three-part ground plan. Behind the defensive wall is a massive moat with a bridge, which was originally protected by a gate tower. The most important building, situated in the residential section on the L-shaped ground plan, is the Royal Palace with its side wing. The second floor of the palace was taken up with a ceremonial hall, while other floors were residential.

During the Hussite Wars, when Wenceslaus' brother Sigismund was in power, the castle was besieged by the Hussite army for three days, until it gave up and burnt down the towns Točník and Hořovice instead. The castle was then mortgaged and handed over from one person to another, but it never found an owner that would keep it for a longer time and so it was gradually reduced to ruins. Jan of Wartenberg initiated the first stage of the Renaissance alterations, which were continued by the Lobkowicz family. In 1594, the castle came once again to the royal property and was administrated by the Bohemian Royal Chamber. The Thirty Years' War contributed greatly to the castle's deterioration. In 1923, the castle was sold to the Czech Association of Tourists for 2,000 CSK and now it belongs to the state. Since the 1930s the gradual restoration works continue until this day.

== Popular culture ==
The movies Bathory, Faust, Hard to Be a God and the series Charles II: The Power and the Passion were filmed at Točník.
