= Michal Vorel =

Czech footballer

Personal information
- Date of birth: 27 June 1975 (age 51)
- Place of birth: Prague, Czechoslovakia
- Height: 1.97 m (6 ft 6 in)
- Position: Goalkeeper

Youth career
- 1981–1993: Dukla Prague

Senior career*
Years	Team	Apps	(Gls)
1993–1995	Dukla Prague	3	(0)
1995–1996	SK Sparta Krč		
1997	→ HFK Přerov (loan)	23	(0)
1998	FC Baník Ostrava	0	(0)
1998	→ FK Chmel Blšany (loan)	13	(0)
1999–2000	SFC Opava	7	(0)
2000	→ FK Matador Púchov (loan)	3	(0)
2000	→ FK VTJ Koba Senec (loan)		
2001–2002	SK Sparta Krč		
2002–2006	FC Vysočina Jihlava	80	(0)
2006–2008	SK Slavia Praha	33	(0)
2009	→ FK Dukla Prague (loan)	5	(0)
2009–	FK Mladá Boleslav	7	(0)
2011	→ FK Ústí nad Labem (loan)	9	(0)
- * Club domestic league appearances and goals as of 30 June 2011

Michal Vorel (born 27 June 1975 in Prague) is a Czech football goalkeeper.
