= Cerhovice =

- Market town
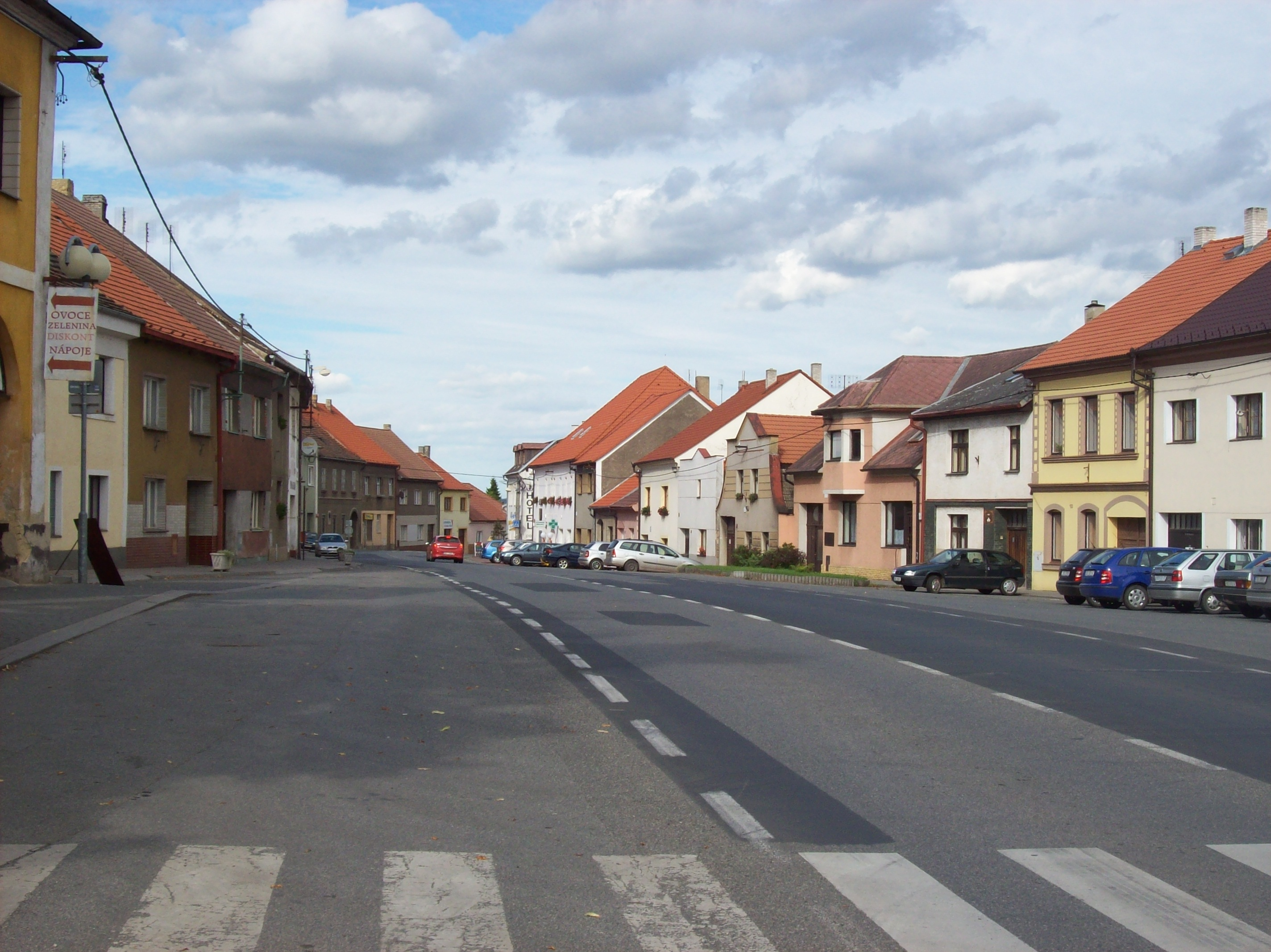
- Square and main road in Cerhovice

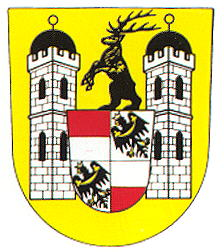
- Flag Coat of arms

- Location in the Czech Republic
- Coordinates: 49°50′59″N 13°50′6″E
- Country: Czech Republic
- Region: Central Bohemian
- District: Beroun
- First mentioned: 1275

Area
  - Total: 8.10 km^{2} (3.13 sq mi)
- Elevation: 411 m (1,348 ft)

Population (2026-01-01)
  - Total: 1,209
  - Density: 149/km^{2} (387/sq mi)
- Time zone: UTC+1 (CET)
  - Summer (DST): UTC+2 (CEST)
- Postal code: 267 61
- Website: www.cerhovice.cz

Cerhovice (Czech pronunciation: [ˈtsɛrɦovɪtsɛ]) is a market town in Beroun District in the Central Bohemian Region of the Czech Republic. It has about 1,200 inhabitants.

== Administrative division ==
Cerhovice consists of two municipal parts (in brackets population according to the 2021 census):

- Cerhovice (897)
- Třenice (256)

== Etymology ==
The initial name of the village was Crhovice. The name was derived from the personal name Crh or Crha (derived from the name Cyril), meaning "the village of Crh's/Crha's people".

== Geography ==
Cerhovice is located about 19 kilometres (12 mi) southwest of Beroun and 42 km (26 mi) southwest of Prague. It lies on the border between the Hořovice Uplands and Křivoklát Highlands. The highest point is the hill Třenická hora at 500 m (1,640 ft) above sea level.

== History ==
The first written mention of Cerhovice is in a deed of King Ottokar II from 1275. The village was promoted to a market town in 1516 by King Vladislaus II. The market town was a royal property until 1557, when it was purchased by the Lobkowicz family. Their properties were confiscated as a punishment for preparing an uprising against the king in 1595, and so the royal chamber regained Cerhovice.

== Demographics ==
Historical population

Year	Pop.	±%
1869	1,634	—
1880	1,588	−2.8%
1890	1,342	−15.5%
1900	1,342	+0.0%
1910	1,396	+4.0%

Year	Pop.	±%
1921	1,353	−3.1%
1930	1,326	−2.0%
1950	1,216	−8.3%
1961	1,239	+1.9%
1970	1,107	−10.7%

Year	Pop.	±%
1980	1,009	−8.9%
1991	963	−4.6%
2001	932	−3.2%
2011	1,079	+15.8%
2021	1,153	+6.9%

Source: Censuses

== Transport ==
The D5 motorway from Prague to Plzeň leads south of the market town.

Cerhovice is located on the railway line Plzeň–Beroun.

== Sights ==
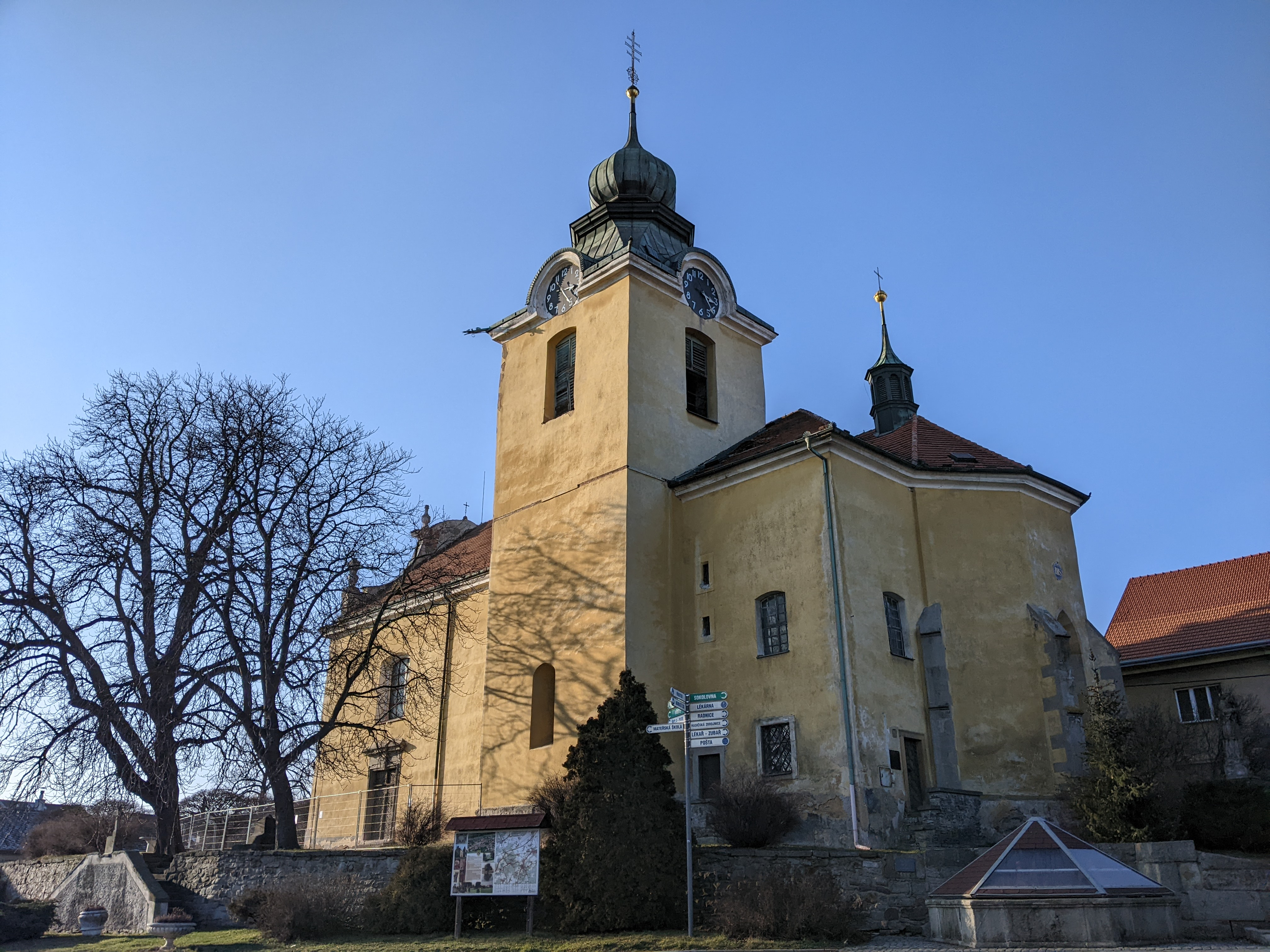
Church of Saint Martin

The main landmark of Cerhovice is the Church of Saint Martin. It was originally a Gothic building from the first half of the 14th century. After the church was damaged by fire in 1728, it was rebuilt in the Baroque style in 1730.

There is a steel telecommunication tower on Třenická hora, which serves as an observation tower. It was opened in 2007 and is 30 m (98 ft) high.
