= Točník =

- Municipality
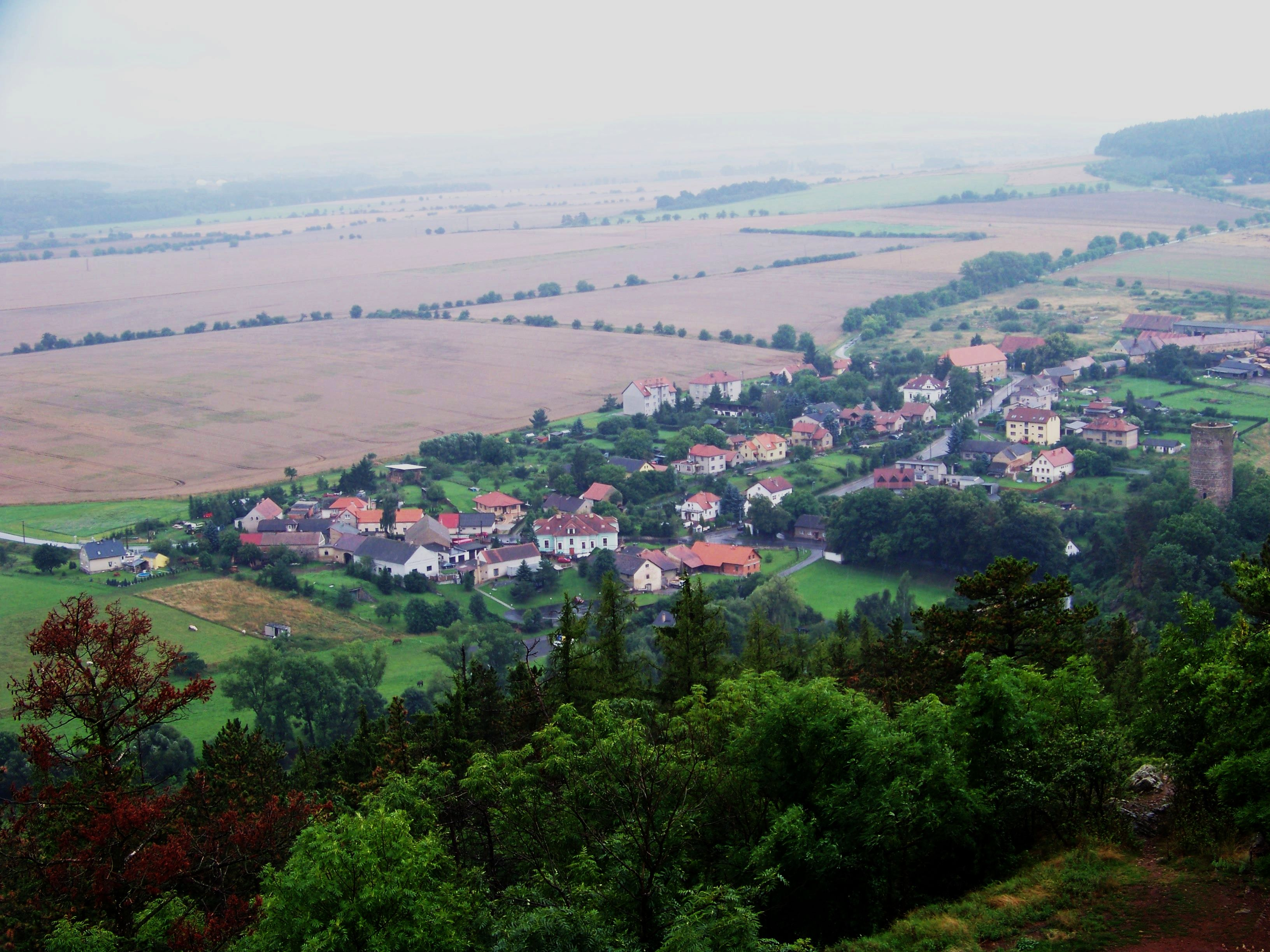
- Točník from the Točník Castle

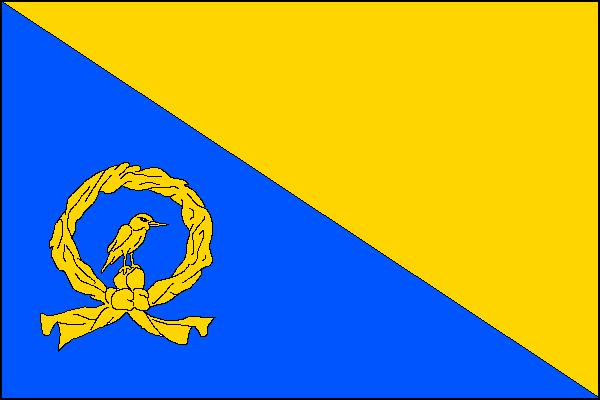
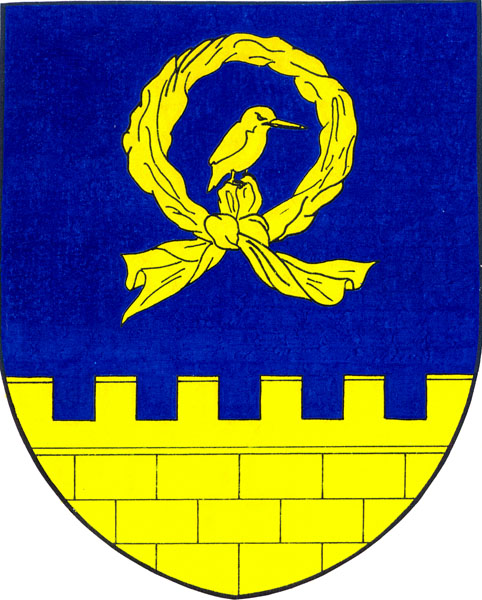
- Flag Coat of arms

- Location in the Czech Republic
- Coordinates: 49°53′8″N 13°52′58″E
- Country: Czech Republic
- Region: Central Bohemian
- District: Beroun
- First mentioned: 1390

Area
  - Total: 5.38 km^{2} (2.08 sq mi)
- Elevation: 345 m (1,132 ft)

Population (2026-01-01)
  - Total: 281
  - Density: 52.2/km^{2} (135/sq mi)
- Time zone: UTC+1 (CET)
  - Summer (DST): UTC+2 (CEST)
- Postal code: 267 51
- Website: tocnik-obec.com

Točník is a municipality and village in Beroun District in the Central Bohemian Region of the Czech Republic. It has about 300 inhabitants.

== Demographics ==
Historical population
Year	Pop.	±%
1869	281	—
1880	280	−0.4%
1890	290	+3.6%
1900	274	−5.5%
1910	267	−2.6%
1921	250	−6.4%
1930	209	−16.4%
1950	186	−11.0%
1961	226	+21.5%
1970	259	+14.6%
1980	273	+5.4%
1991	259	−5.1%
2001	238	−8.1%
2011	249	+4.6%
2021	256	+2.8%
Source: Censuses

== Sights ==
The municipality is known for the ruins of the medieval castles Žebrák and Točník. Together they are protected as a national cultural monument.

== Gallery ==
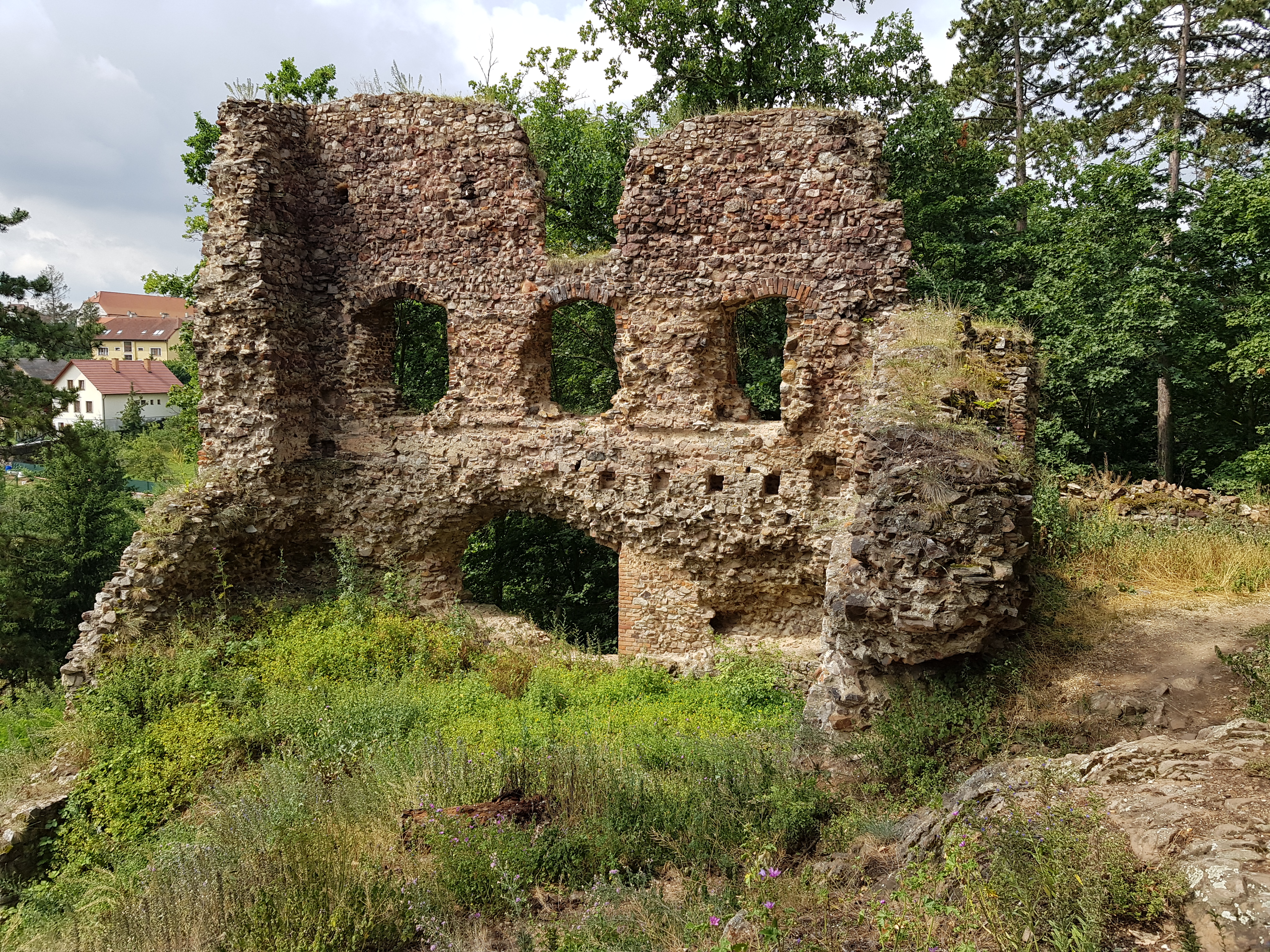
Žebrák Castle ruins

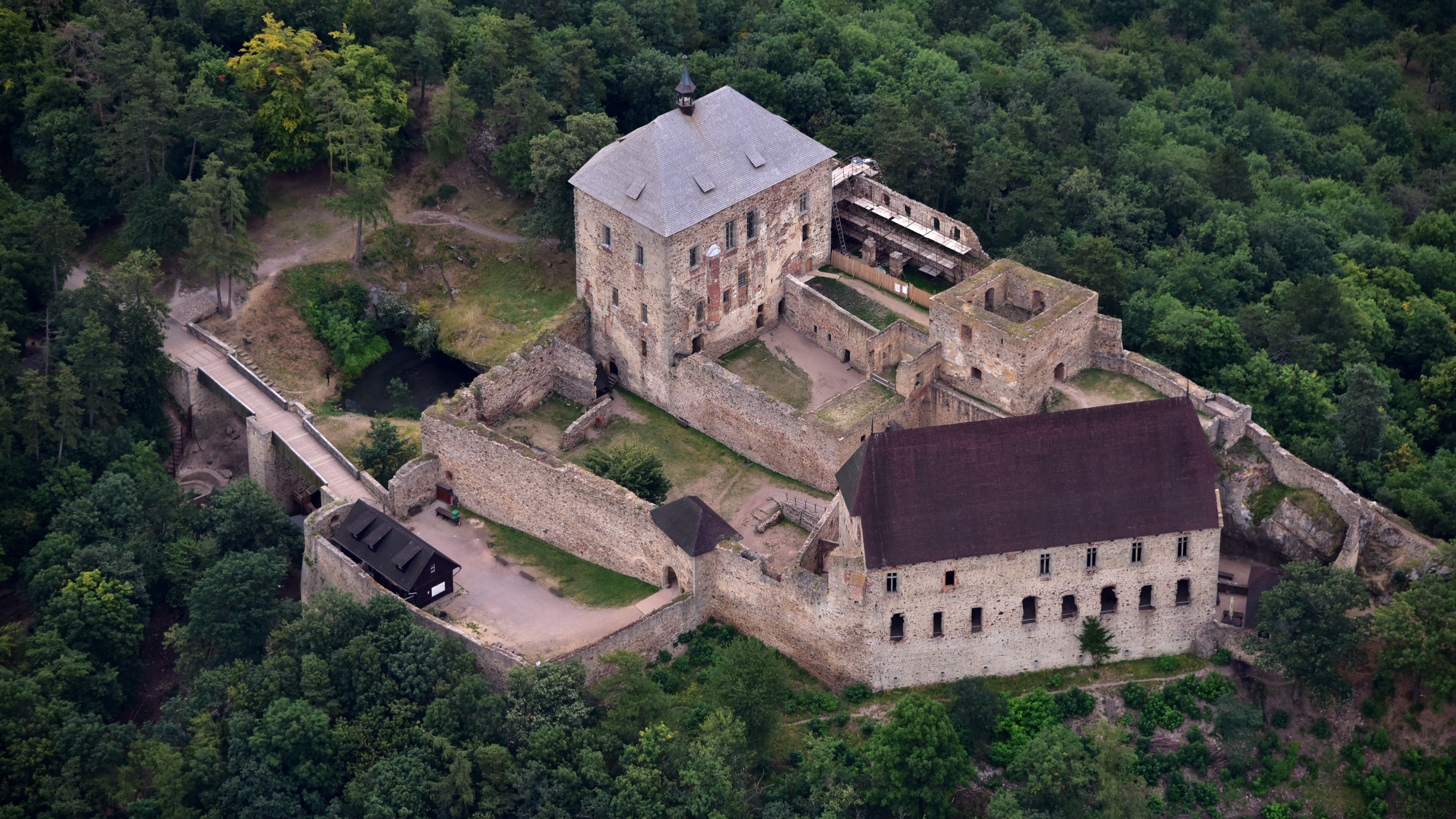
Točník Castle
