= Zdice =

- Town
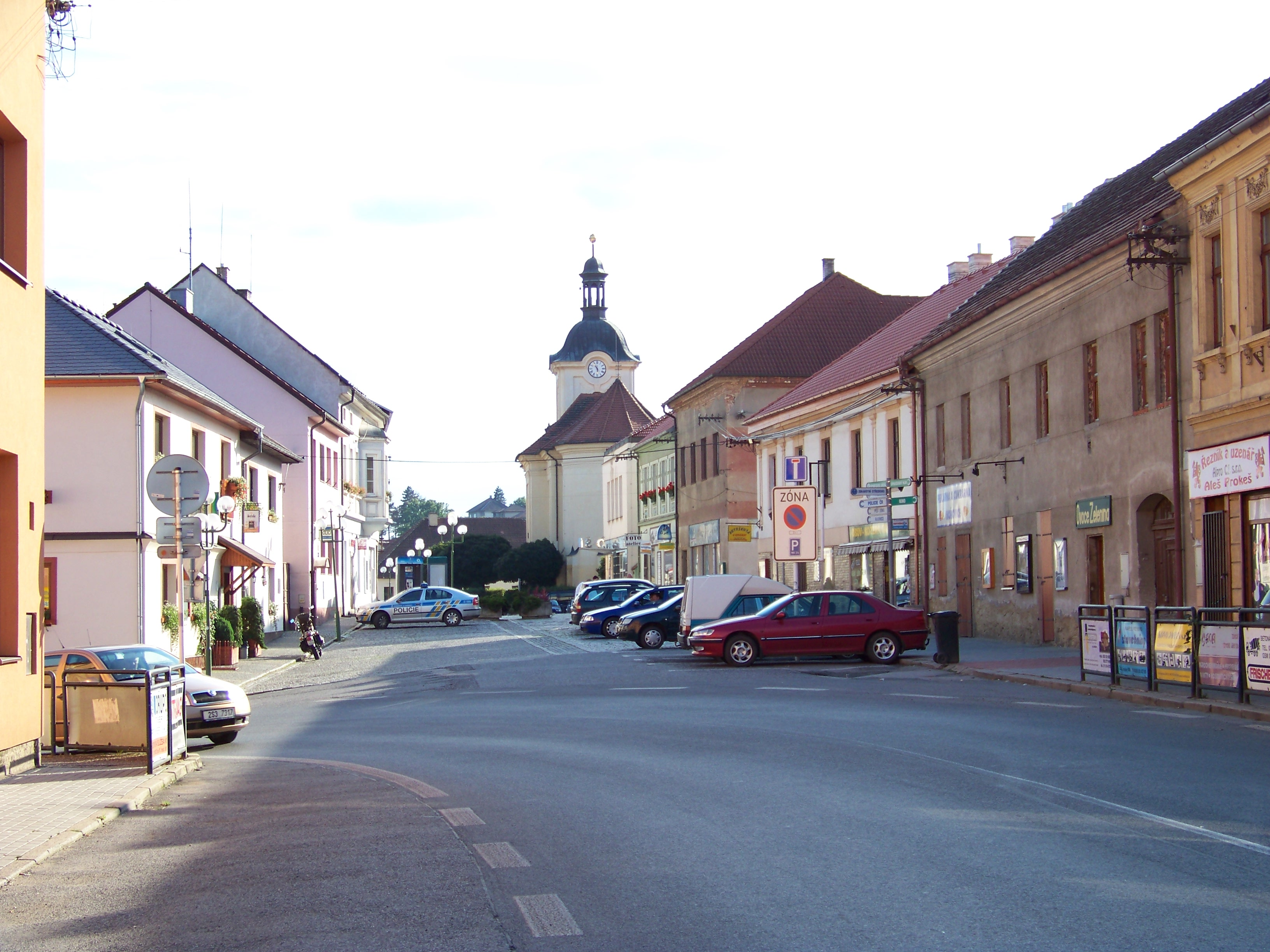
- Centre of Zdice

- Flag Coat of arms

- Location in the Czech Republic
- Coordinates: 49°54′44″N 13°58′39″E
- Country: Czech Republic
- Region: Central Bohemian
- District: Beroun
- First mentioned: 1148

Government
  - Mayor: Antonín Sklenář

Area
  - Total: 13.81 km^{2} (5.33 sq mi)
- Elevation: 268 m (879 ft)

Population (2026-01-01)
  - Total: 4,125
  - Density: 298.7/km^{2} (773.6/sq mi)
- Time zone: UTC+1 (CET)
  - Summer (DST): UTC+2 (CEST)
- Postal code: 267 51
- Website: www.mesto-zdice.cz

Zdice (Czech pronunciation: [ˈzɟɪtsɛ]) is a town in Beroun District in the Central Bohemian Region of the Czech Republic. It has about 4,100 inhabitants. The town is located at the confluence of the Litavka River and the stream Červený potok.

Zdice was founded in the 11th century, but it became a town only in 1994. The most important monument is the Church of the Nativity of the Virgin Mary.

== Administrative division ==
Zdice consists of three municipal parts (in brackets population according to the 2021 census):

- Zdice (3,719)
- Černín (204)
- Knížkovice (192)

== Etymology ==
The initial name of Zdice was Vzdice, derived from the personal name Vzda. From the 15th century, the name Zdice appeared.

== Geography ==
Zdice is located about 8 kilometres (5 mi) southwest of Beroun and 31 km (19 mi) southwest of Prague. It lies mostly in the Hořovice Uplands, including the built-up area. The northwestern part of the municipal territory extends into the Křivoklát Highlands and Křivoklátsko Protected Landscape Area, and includes the highest point of Zdice, which is the hill Kalce at 505 m (1,657 ft) above sea level. The town is situated at the confluence of the Litavka River and the stream Červený potok.

== History ==
The first written mention of Zdice is from 1148. It was probably founded in 1039. Until 1302, it was owned by the bishopric in Prague, then it was joined to the town of Beroun. In 1357, the village was merged with the newly established Karlštejn estate, owned by the royal chamber. During the rule of King Sigismund, Zdice was annexed to the Točník estate, to which it belonged until 1607. From 1607 until the establishment of an independent municipal administration after 1848, the village belonged to the Králův Dvůr estate.

Zdice underwent industrialisation in the second half of the 19th century, and the population grew. In 1872, Zdice was promoted to a market town, and in 1994, it officially became a town.

== Demographics ==
Historical population

Year	Pop.	±%
1869	1,623	—
1880	1,901	+17.1%
1890	2,229	+17.3%
1900	2,682	+20.3%
1910	3,239	+20.8%

Year	Pop.	±%
1921	3,384	+4.5%
1930	3,842	+13.5%
1950	3,539	−7.9%
1961	3,663	+3.5%
1970	3,497	−4.5%

Year	Pop.	±%
1980	4,008	+14.6%
1991	3,723	−7.1%
2001	3,818	+2.6%
2011	4,099	+7.4%
2021	4,115	+0.4%

Source: Censuses

== Transport ==
The D5 motorway from Prague to Plzeň and the Czech–German border in Rozvadov runs through the town.

Zdice is located on the railway lines Prague–Klatovy via Plzeň, Prague–České Budějovice and Beroun–Strakonice.

== Sights ==
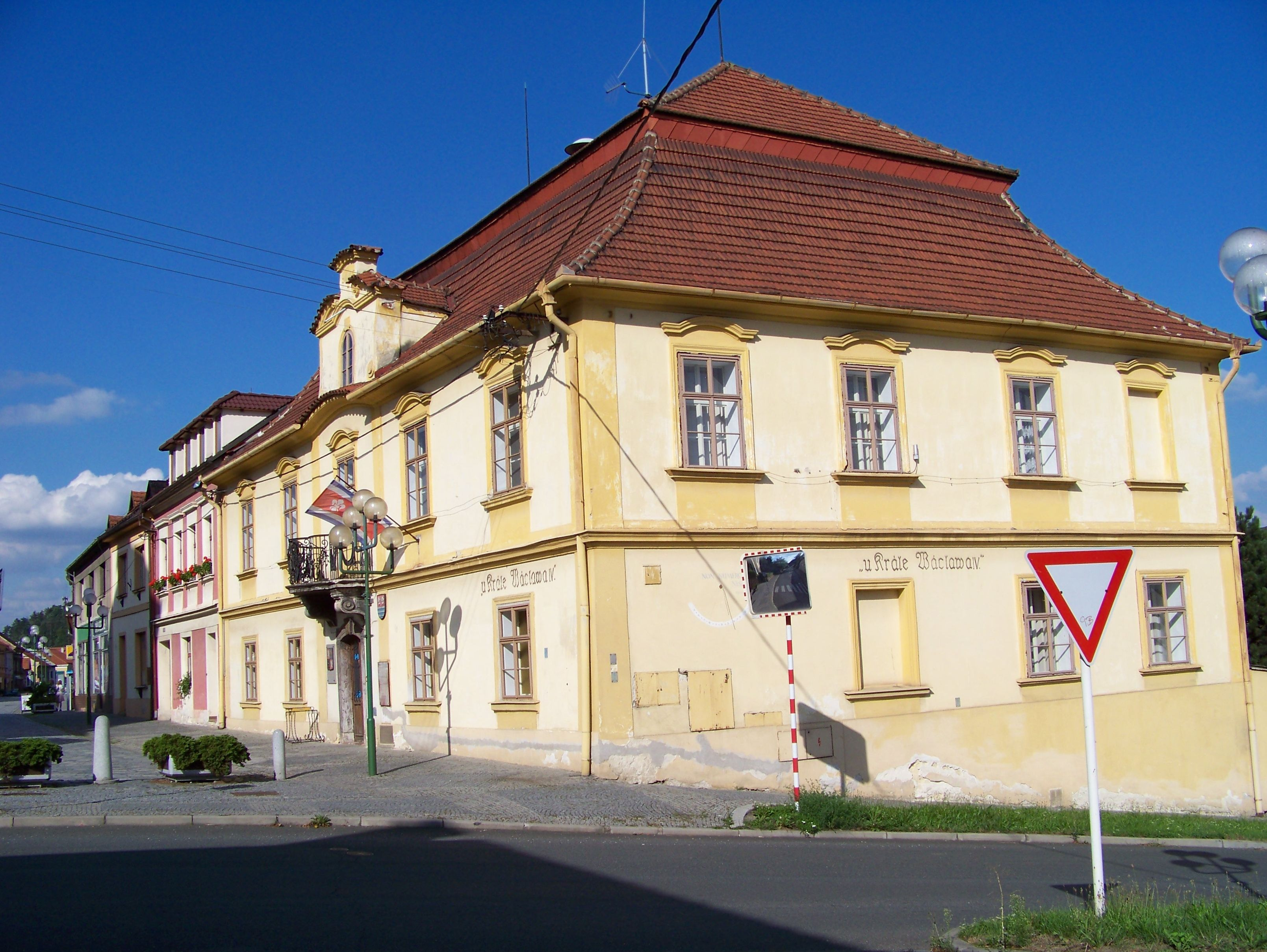
Town hall

The main landmark of Zdice is the Church of the Nativity of the Virgin Mary. It was built in the Baroque style in 1747–1749, when it replaced an old Gothic church.

A valuable building is the town hall. It is a historical house, rebuilt into its current Neoclassical form in the second half of the 18th century. Gothic barrel vaults are preserved in the basement.

== Notable people ==
- Josef Vorel (1801–1874), priest and composer
