= Vojtěch Nejedlý =

Czech writer

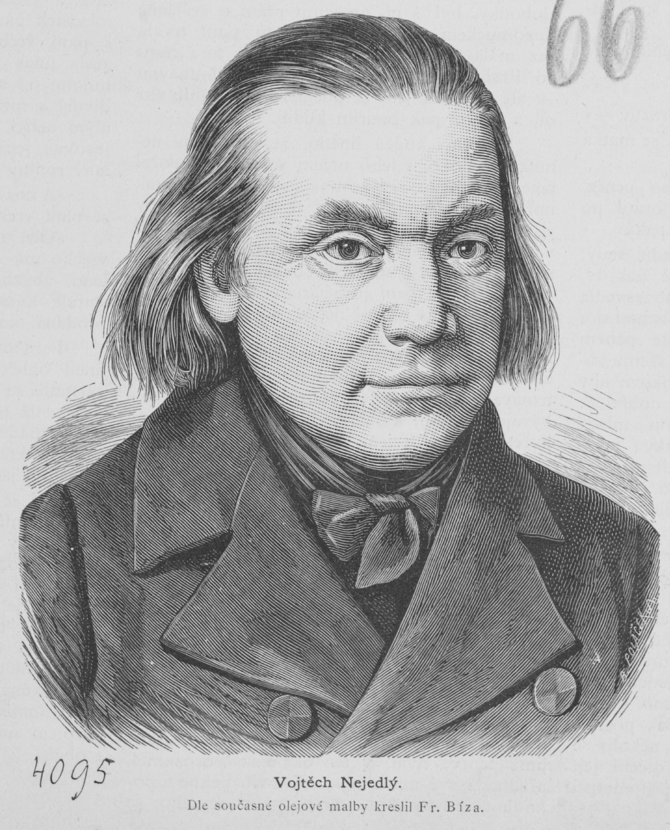
Vojtěch Nejedlý

Vojtěch Nejedlý (17 April 1772, in Žebrák – 7 December 1844, in Žebrák) was a Czech writer.
