= List of castles in the Central Bohemian Region =

This is a list of castles and chateaux located in the Central Bohemian Region of the Czech Republic.

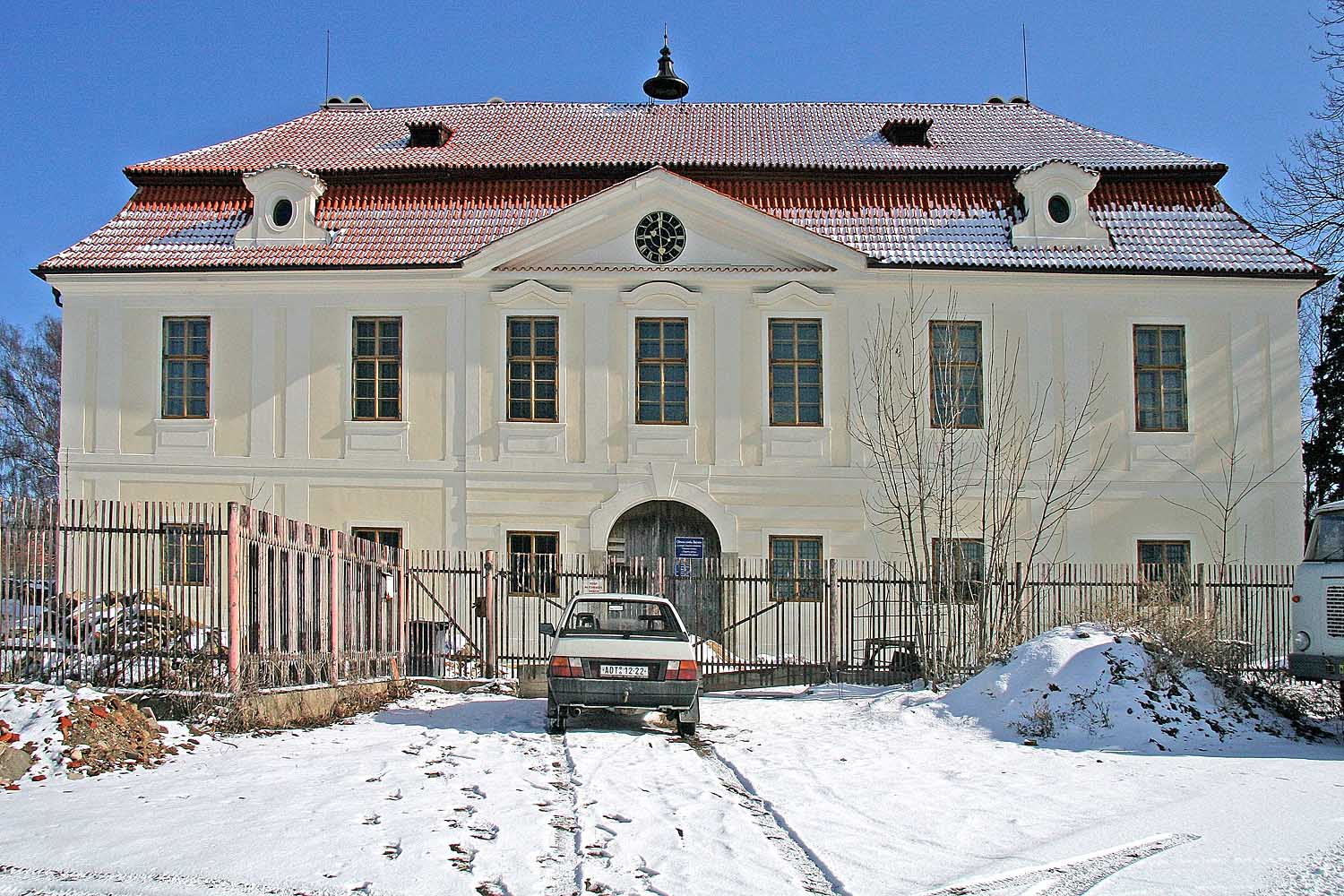
Bečváry

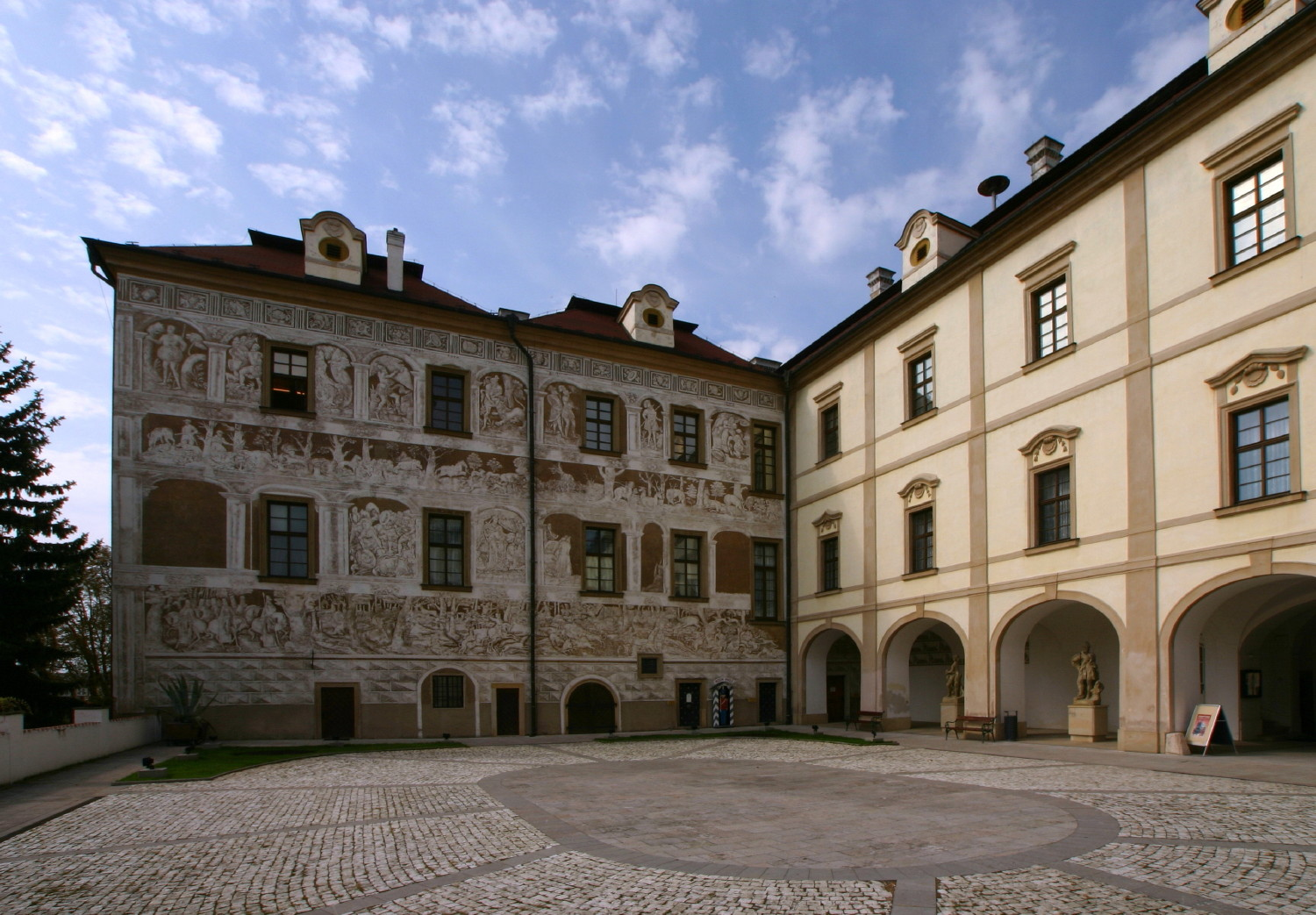
Benátky nad Jizerou

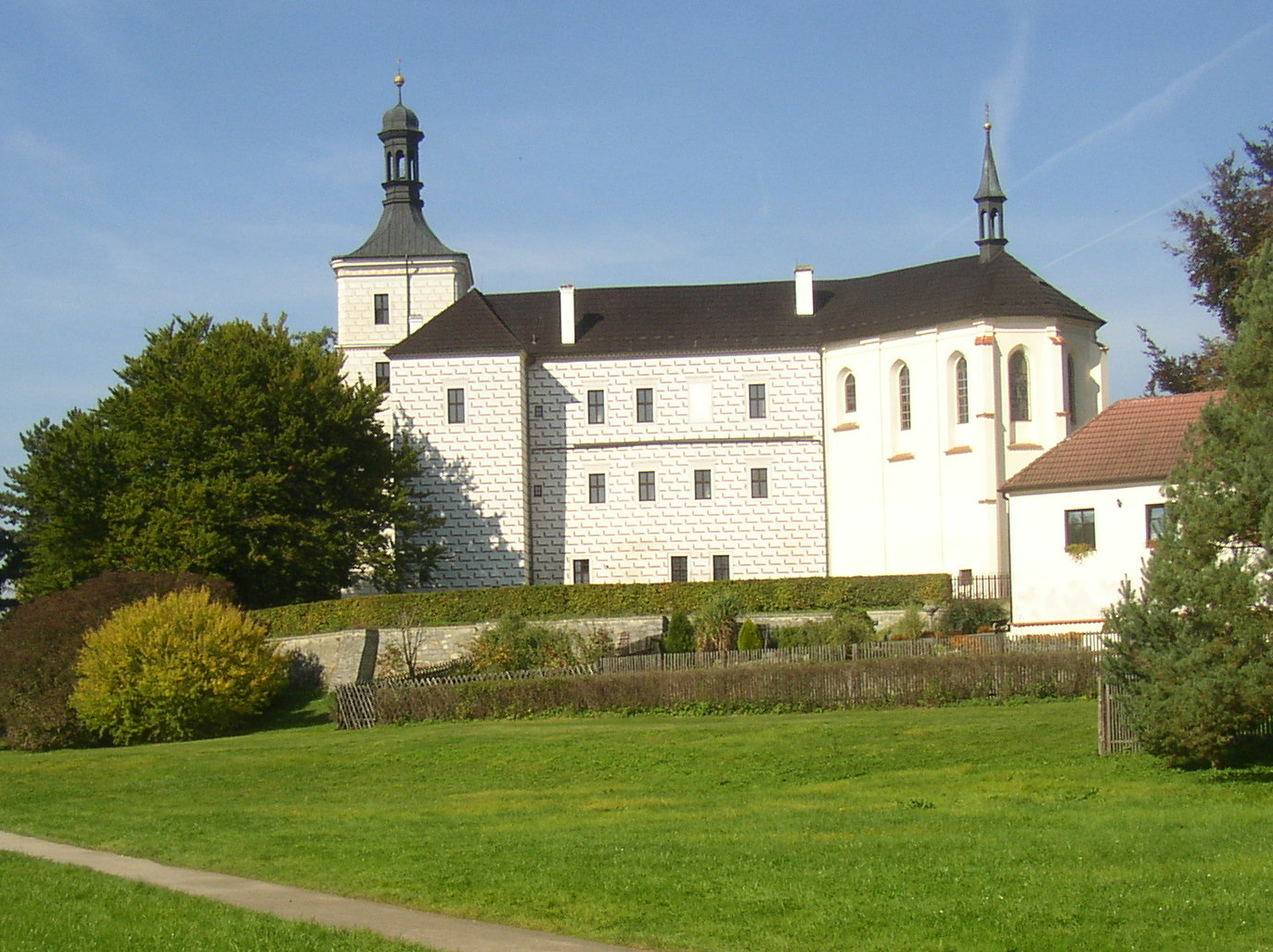
Březnice

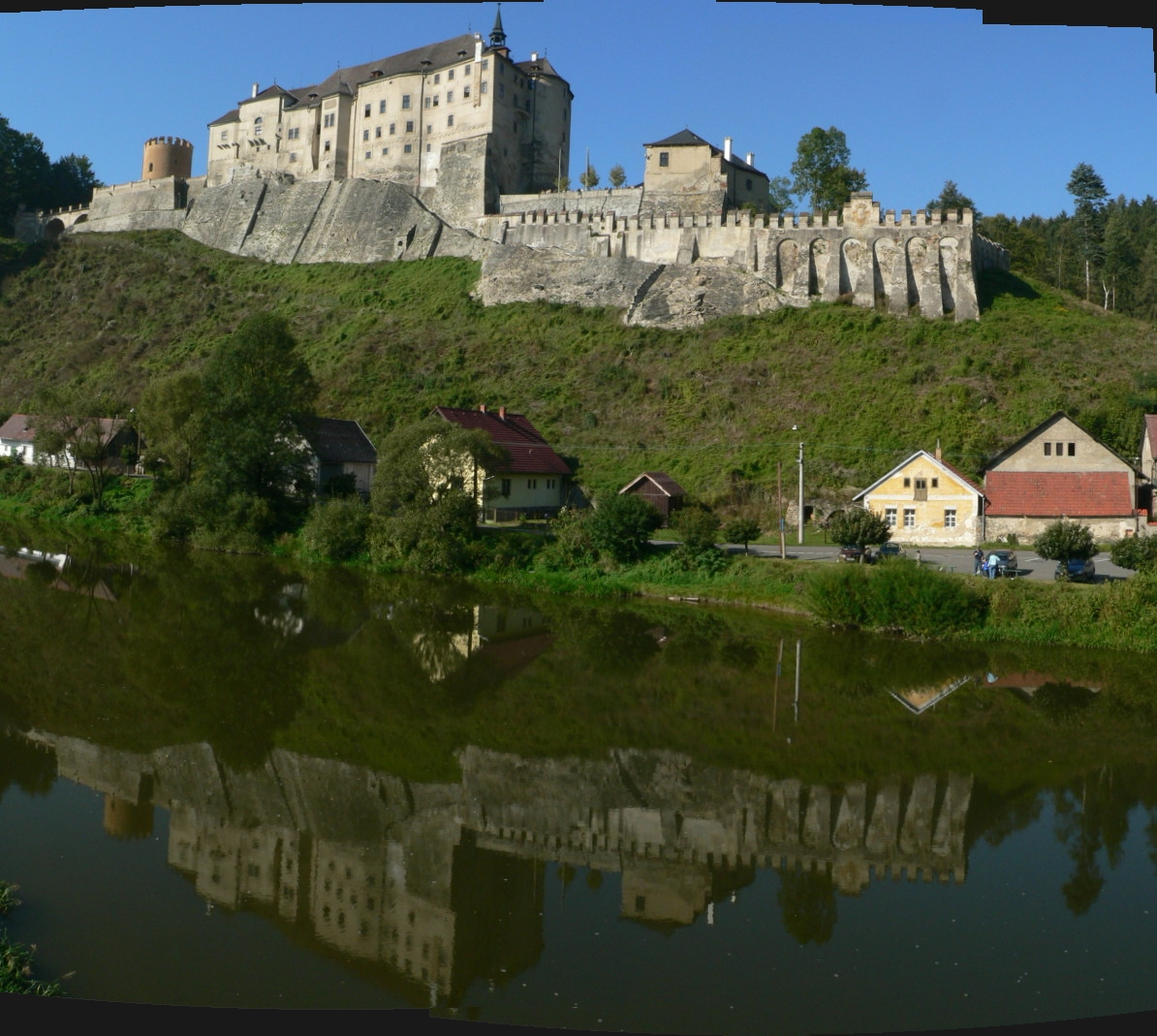
Český Šternberk

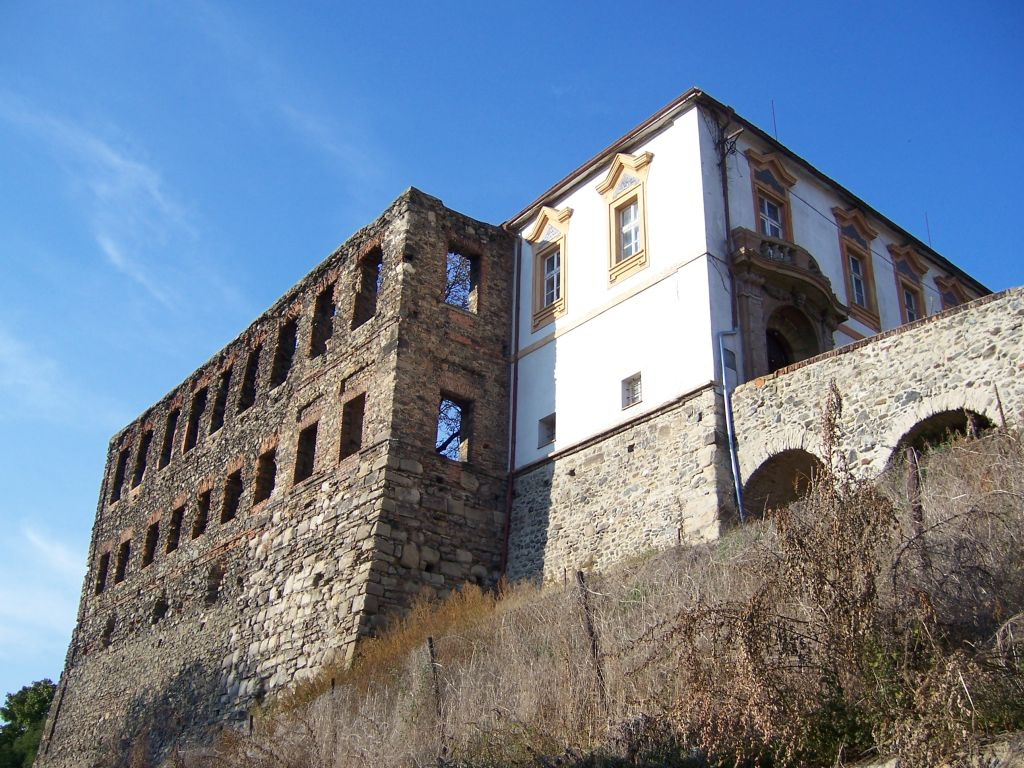
Chvatěruby

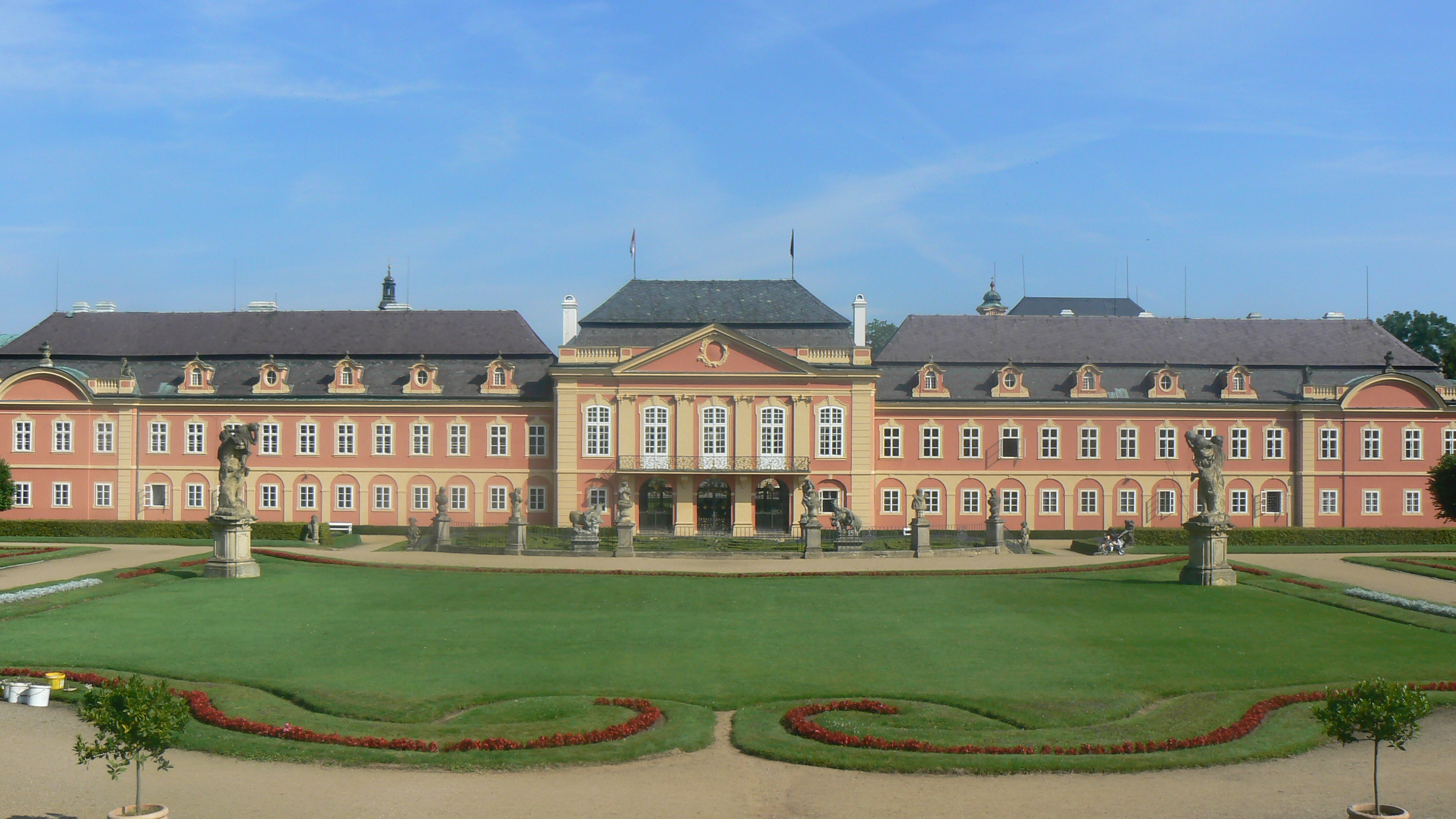
Dobříš

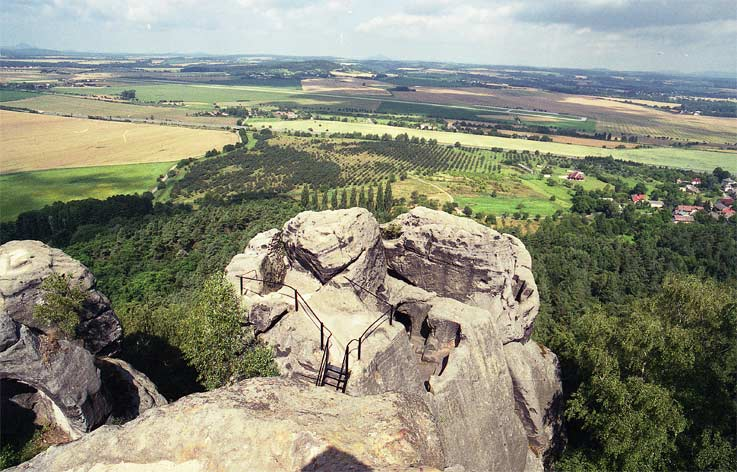
Drábské světničky

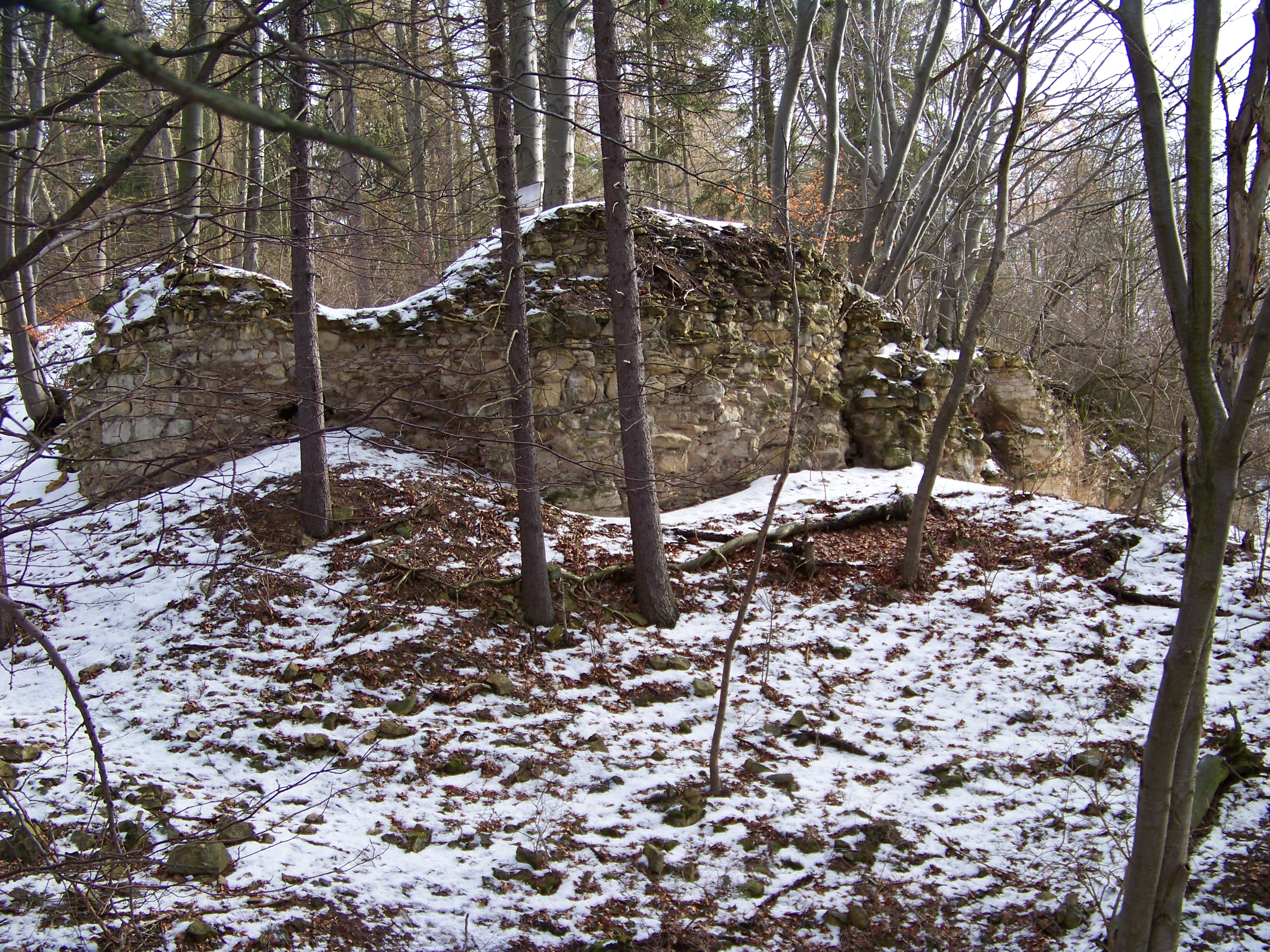
Džbán

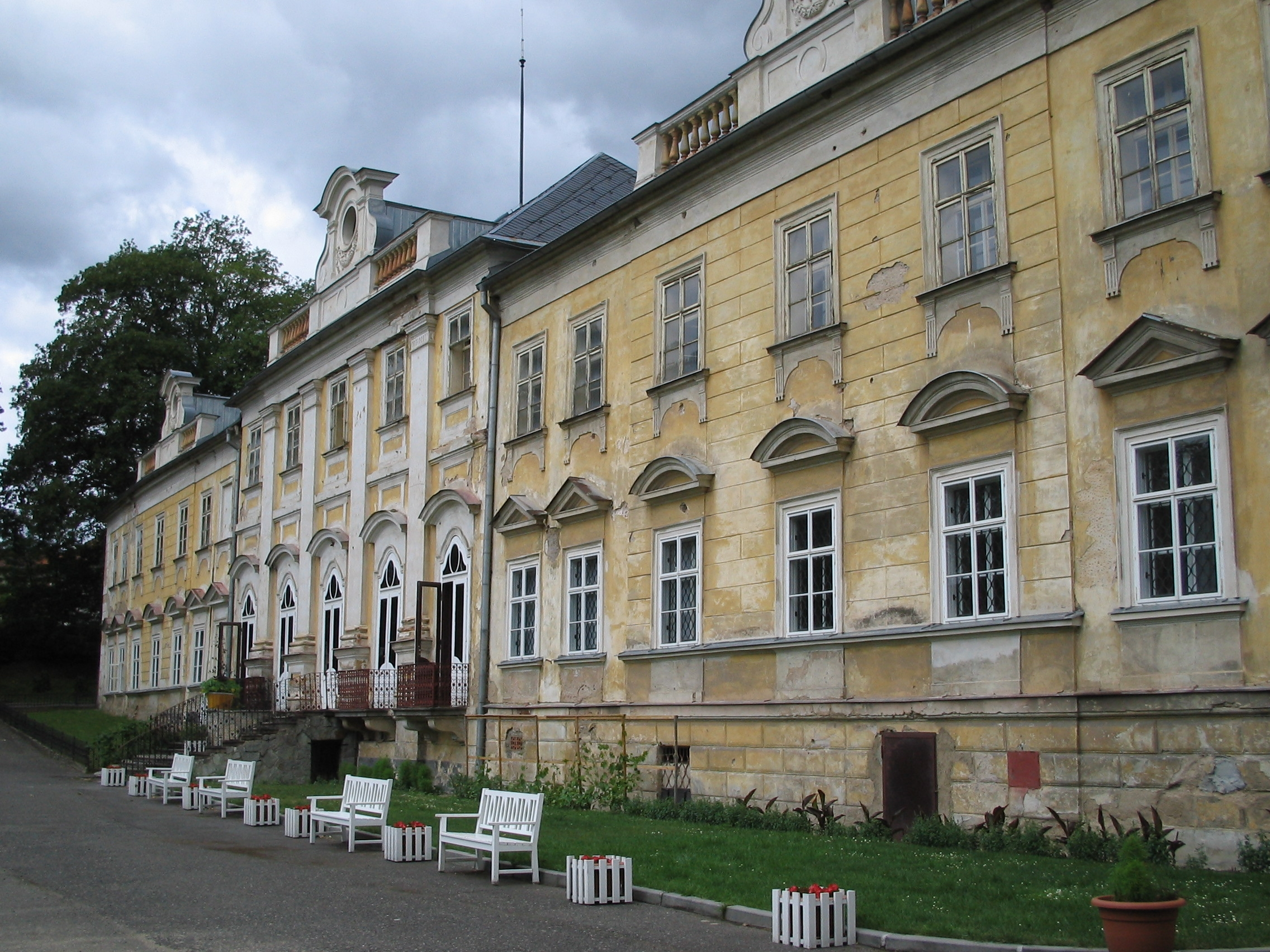
Hluboš

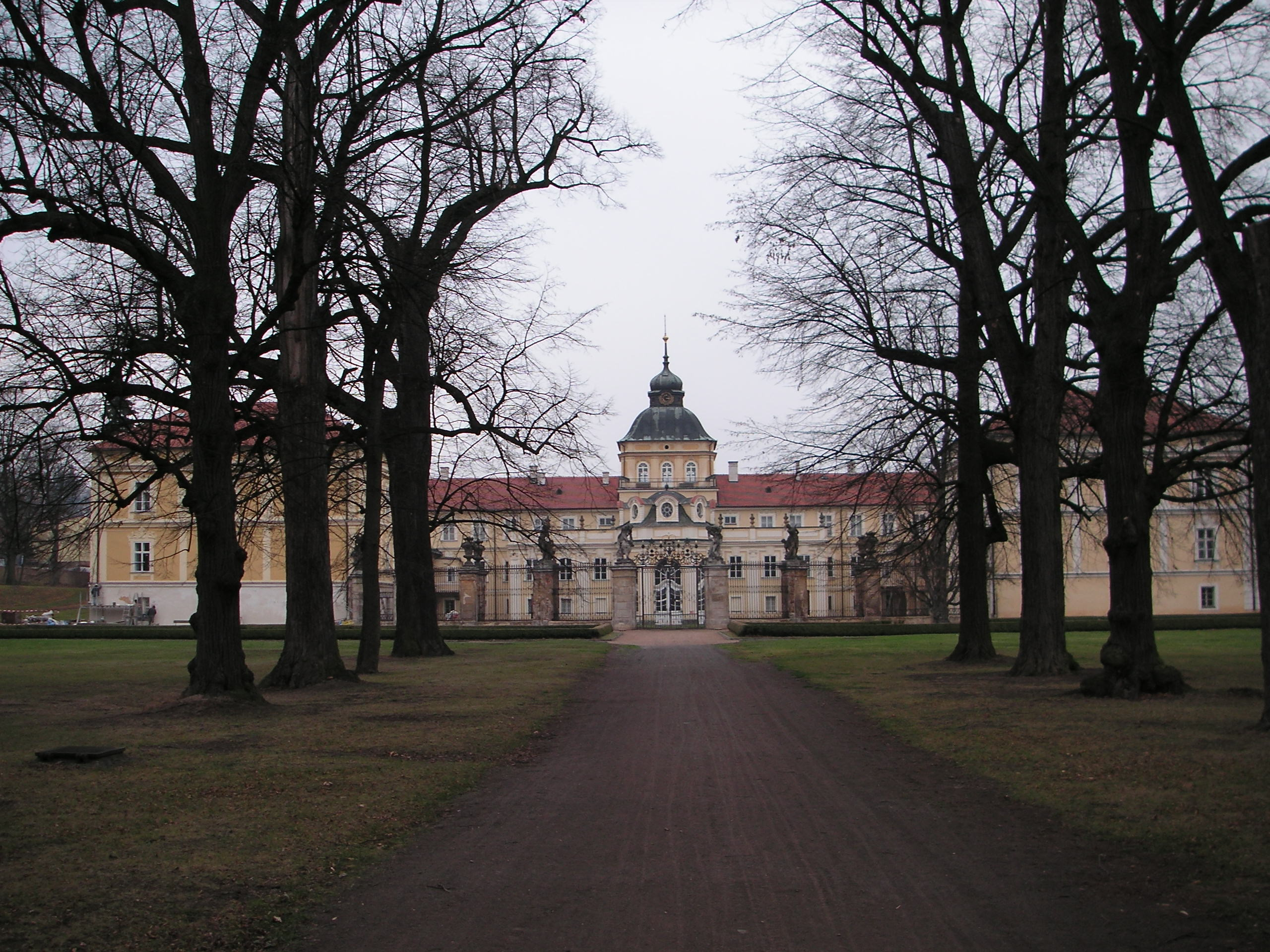
Hořovice

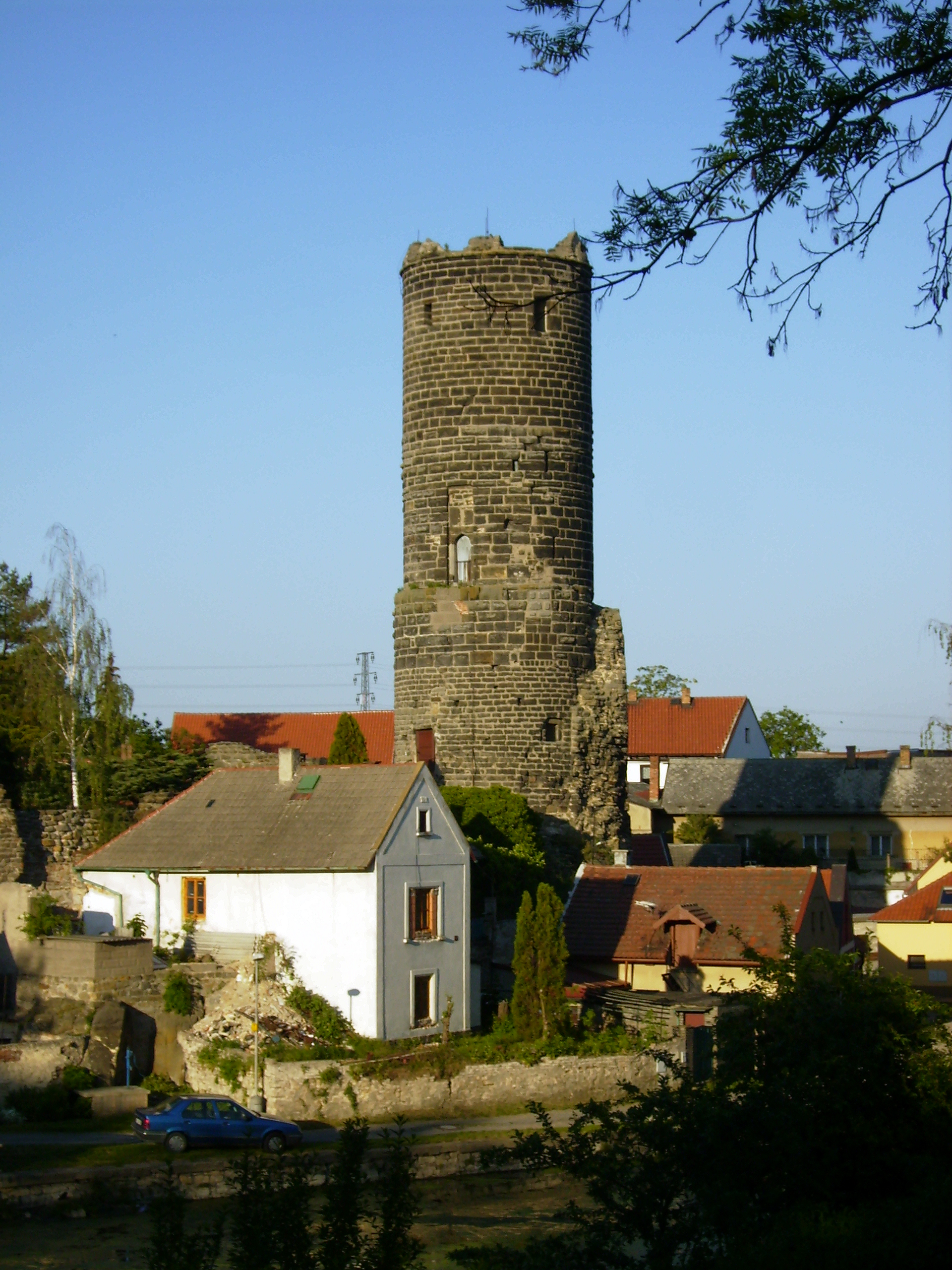
Jenštejn

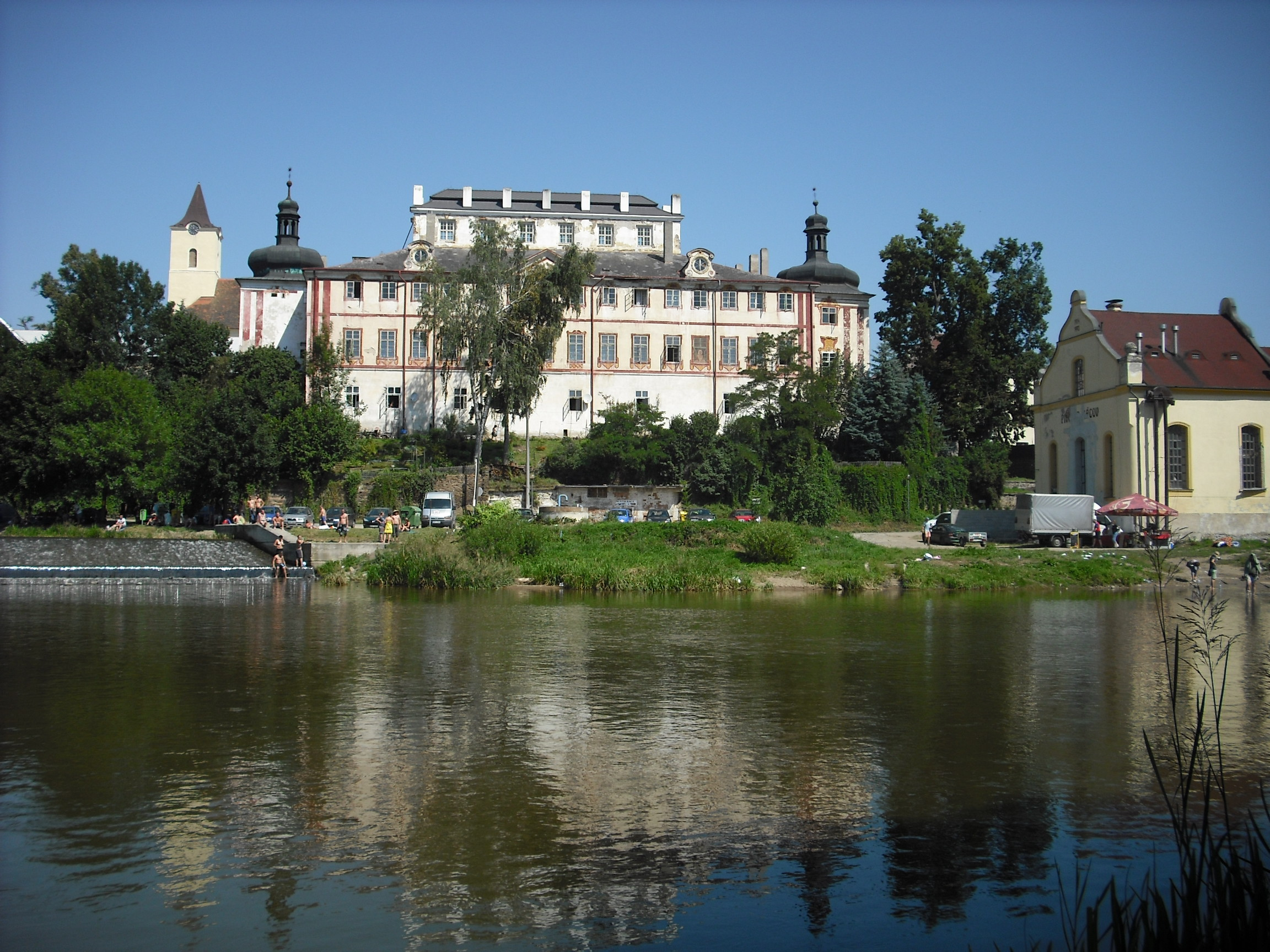
Kácov

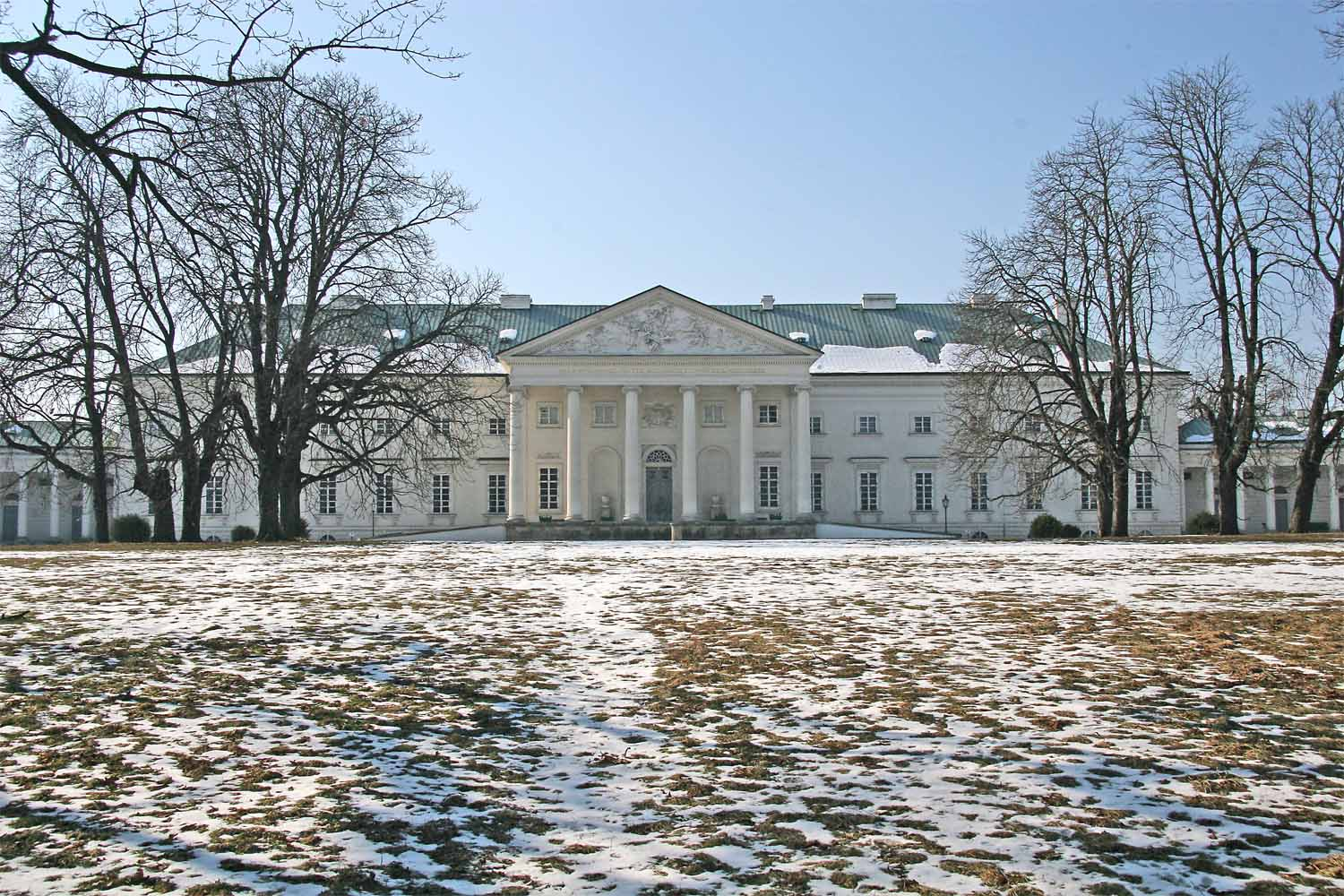
Kačina

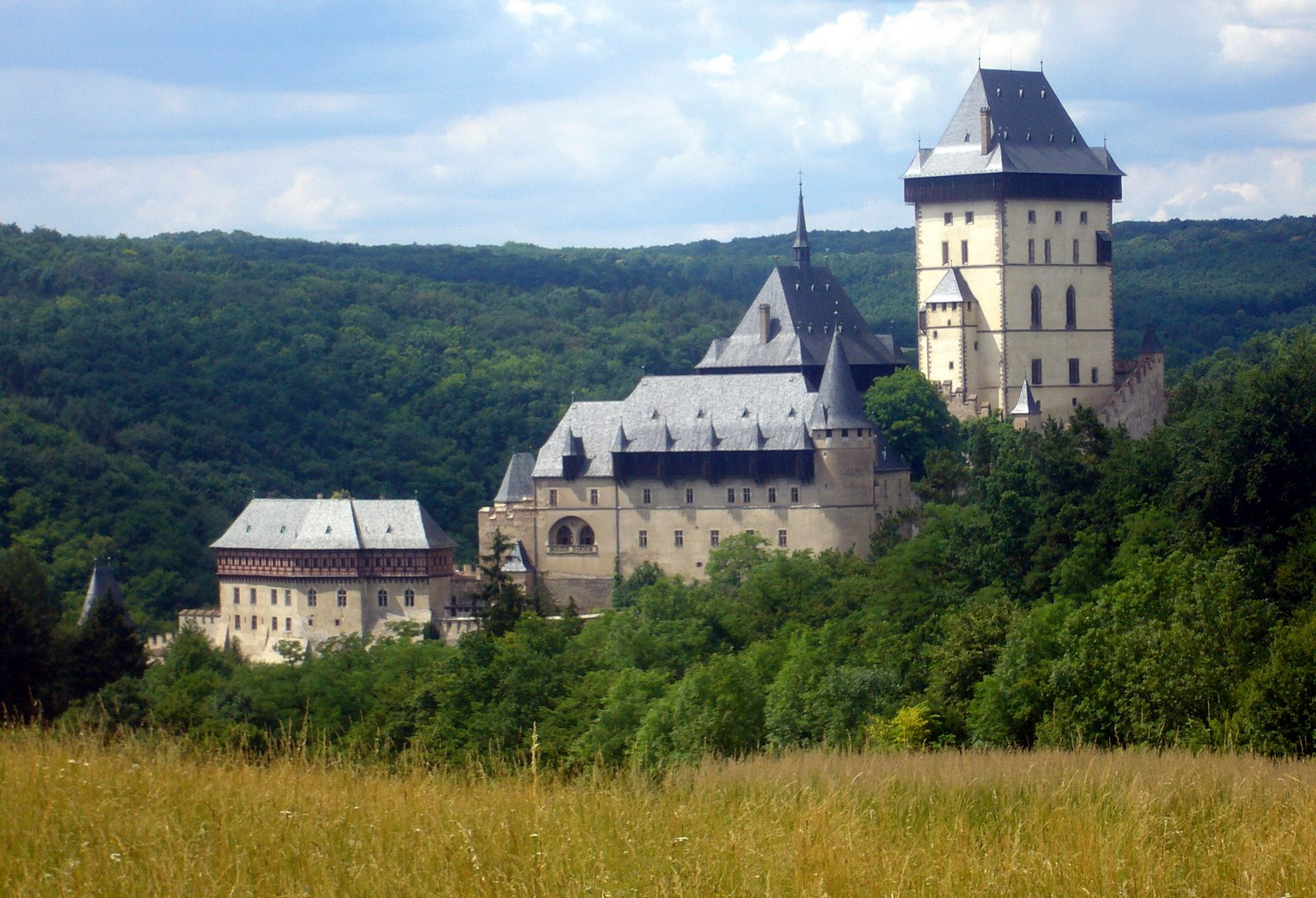
Karlštejn

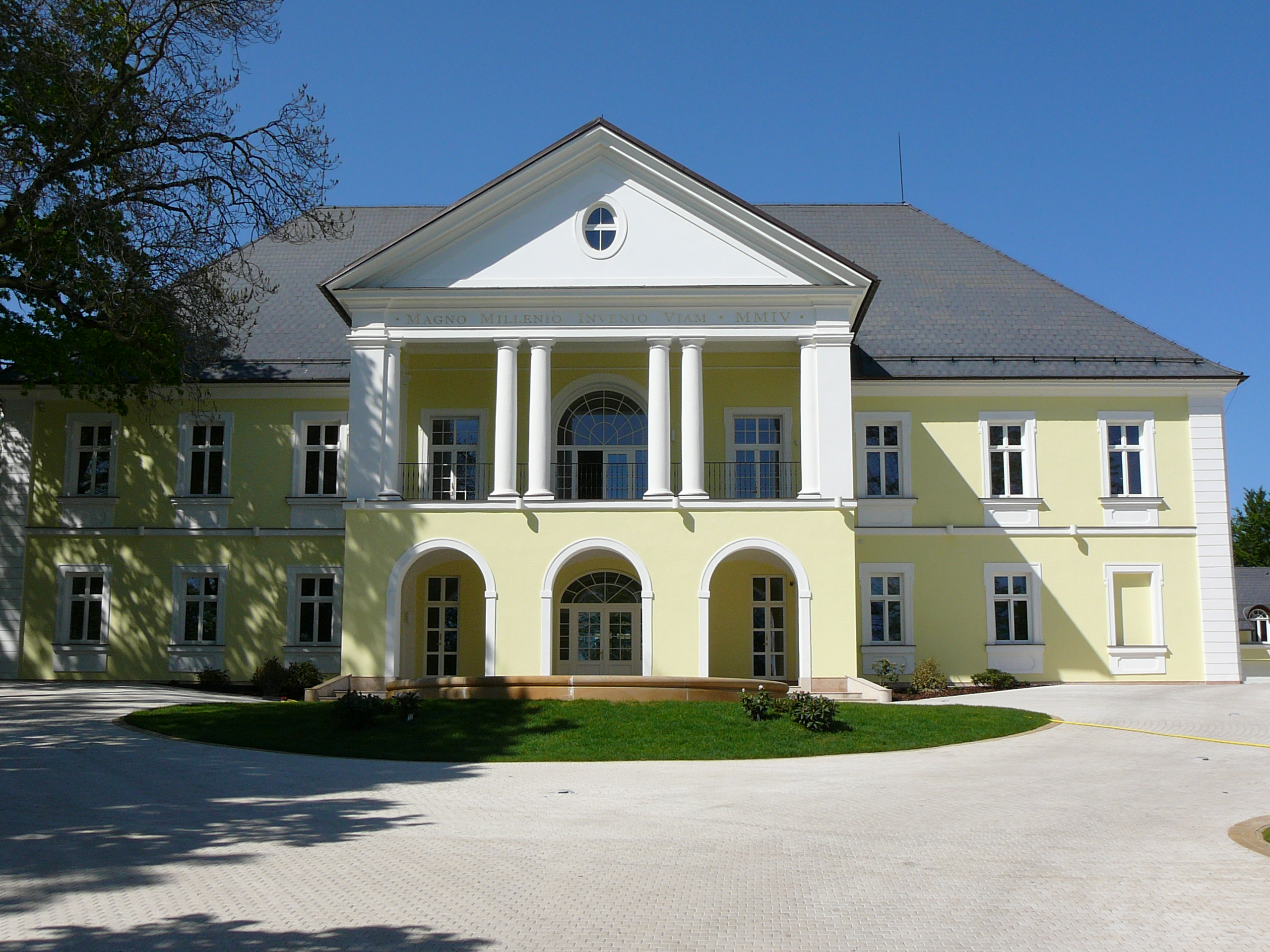
Klecany

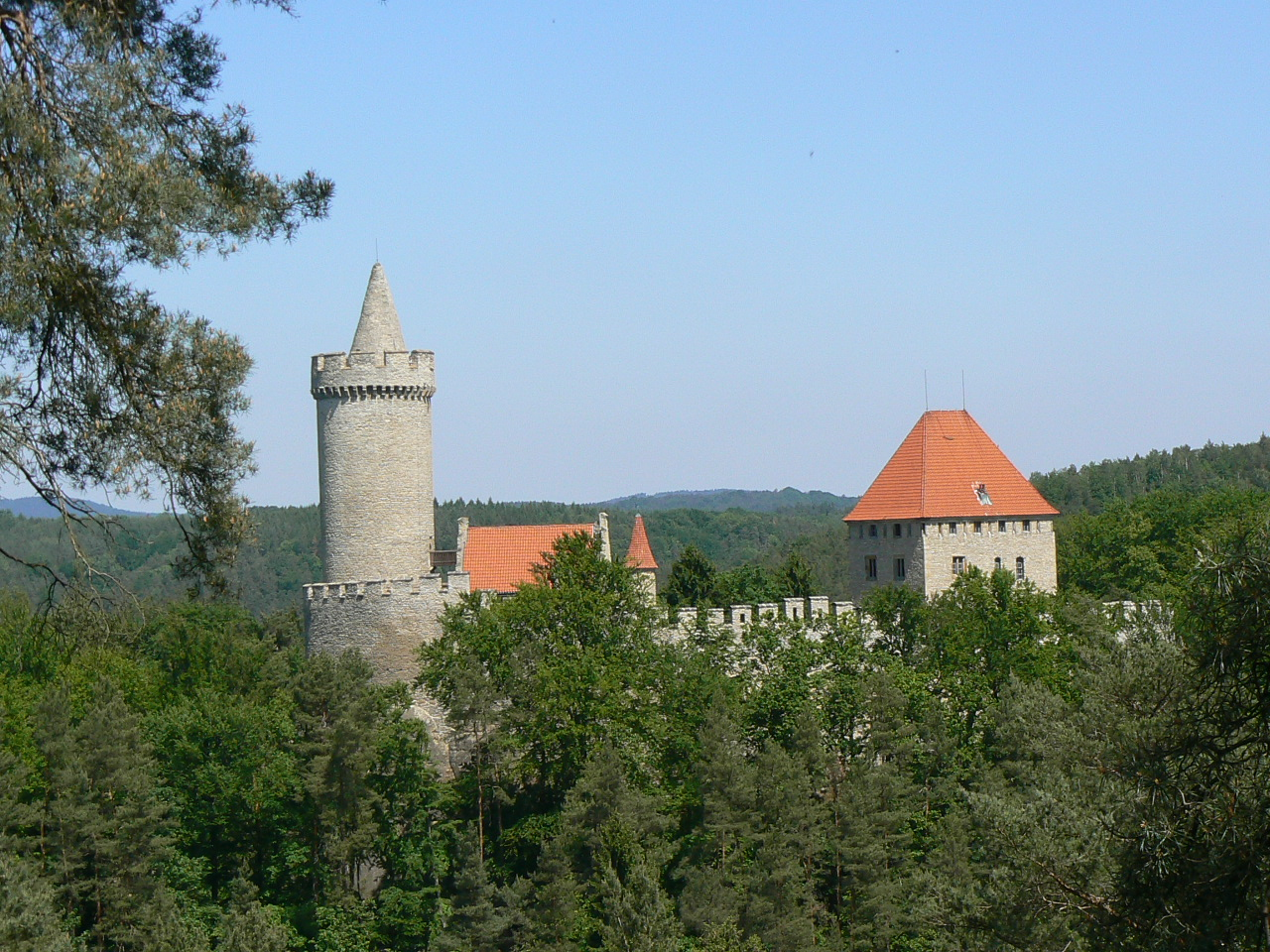
Kokořín

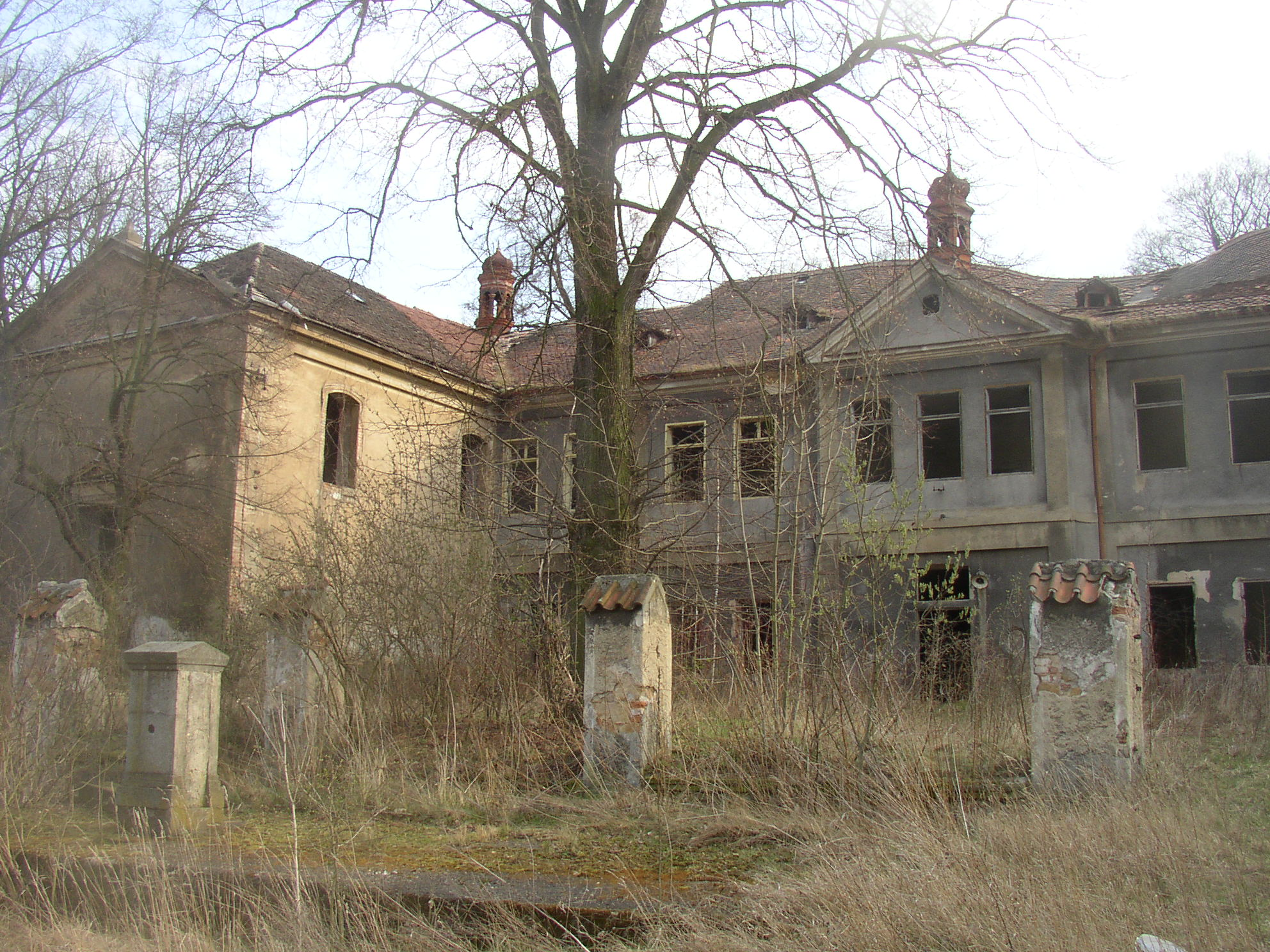
Koleč

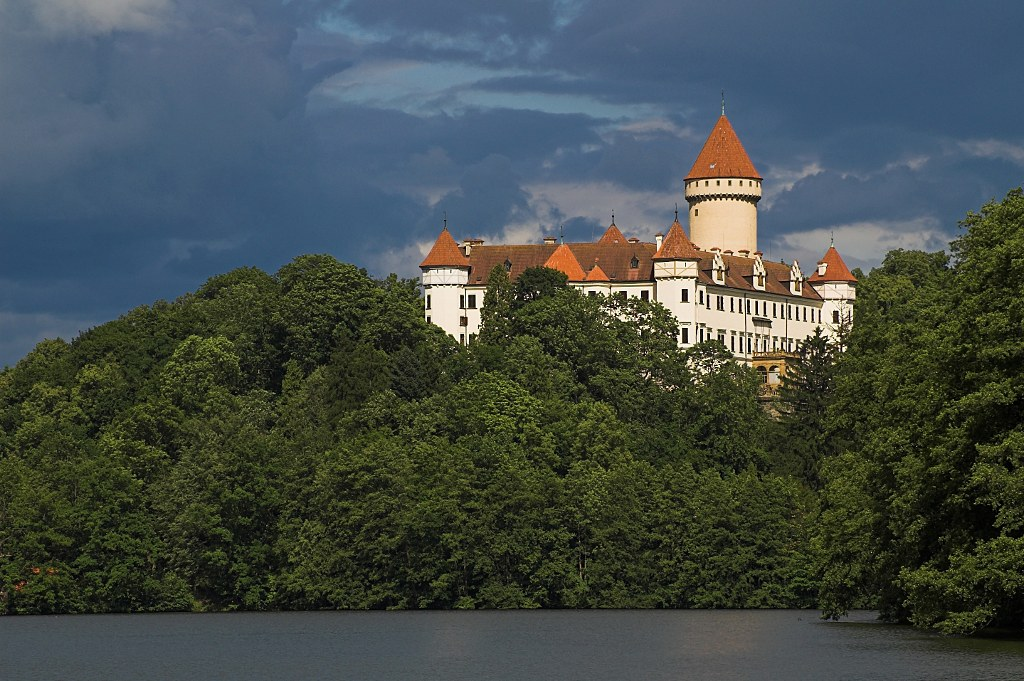
Konopiště

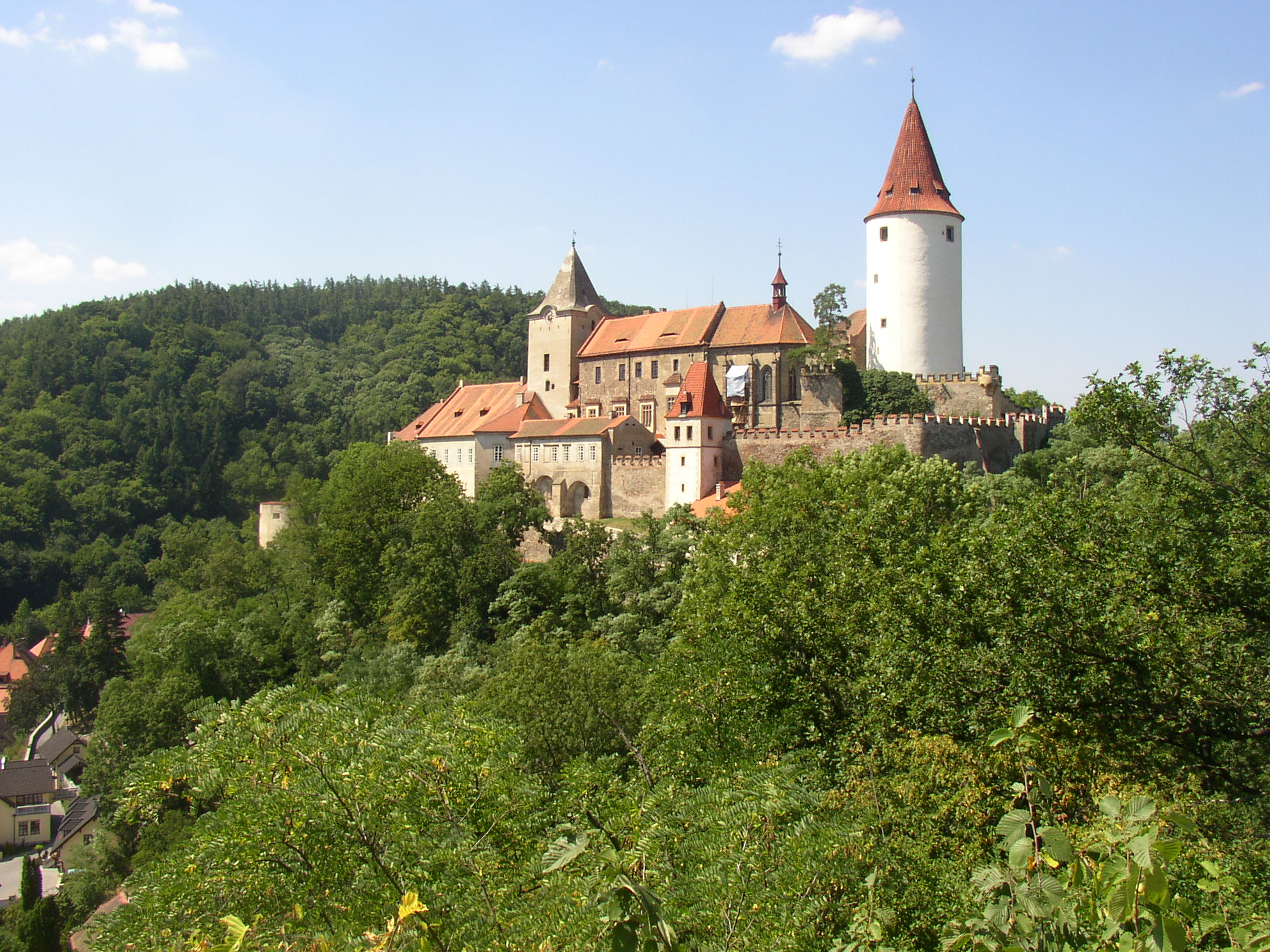
Křivoklát

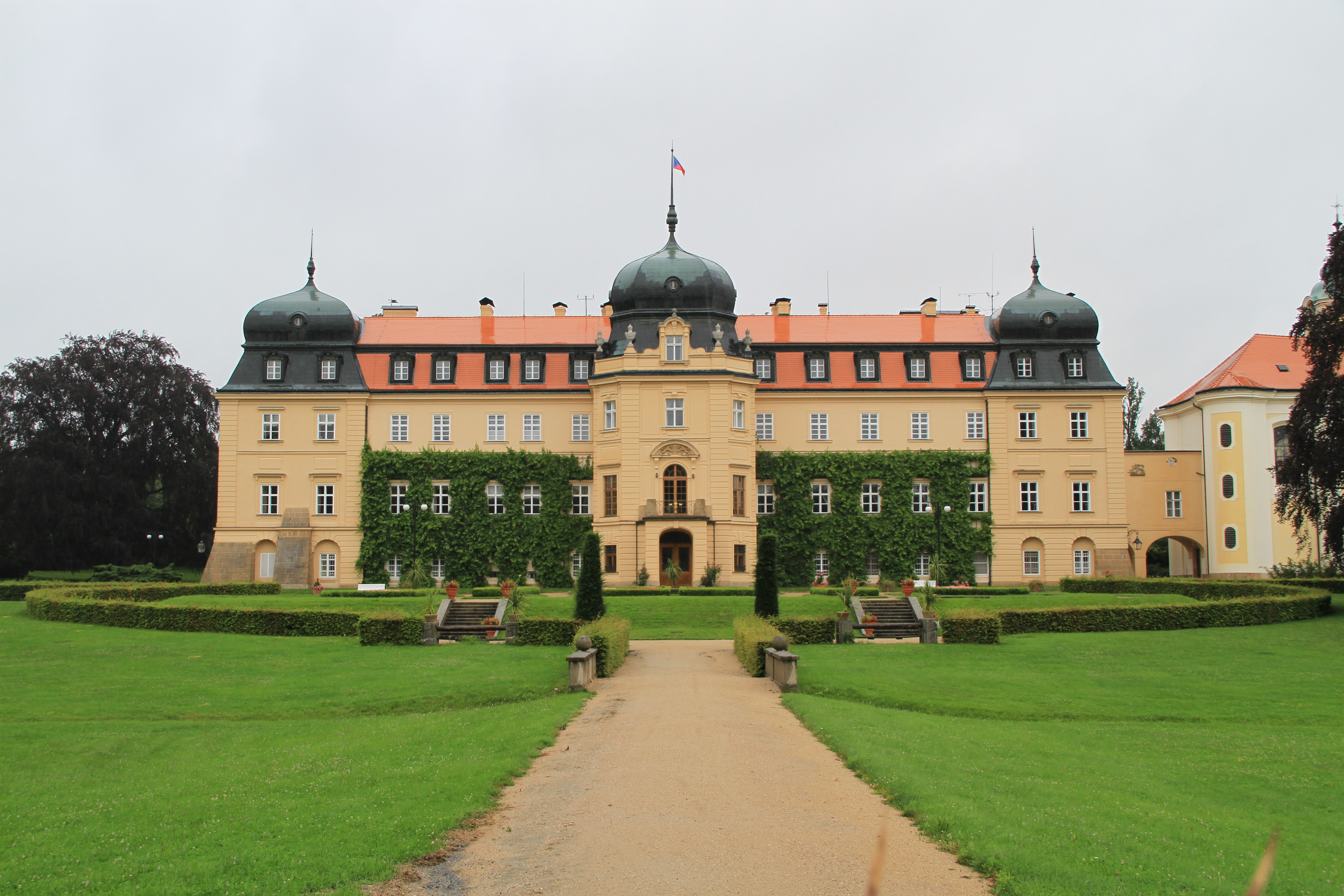
Lány

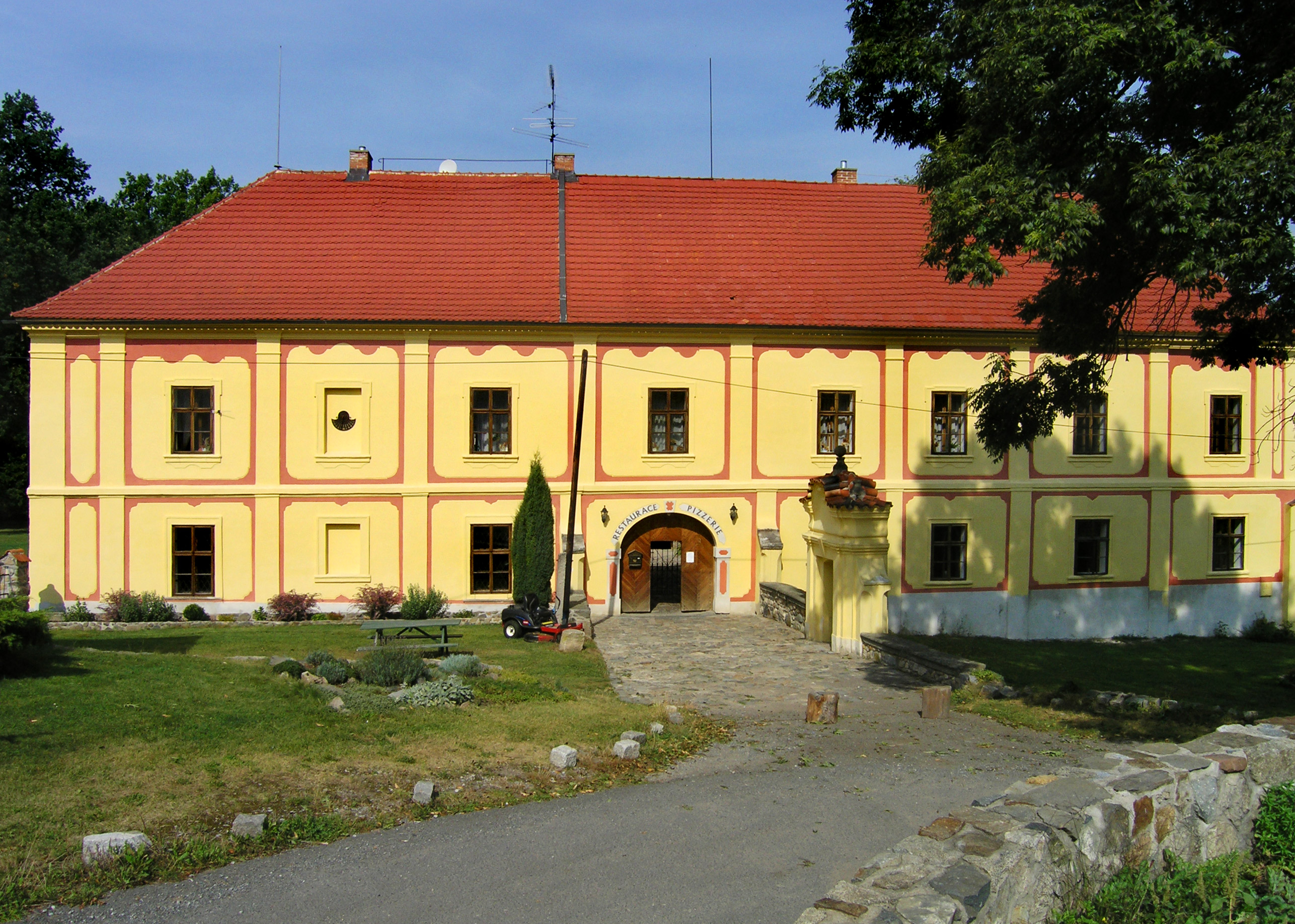
Lešany

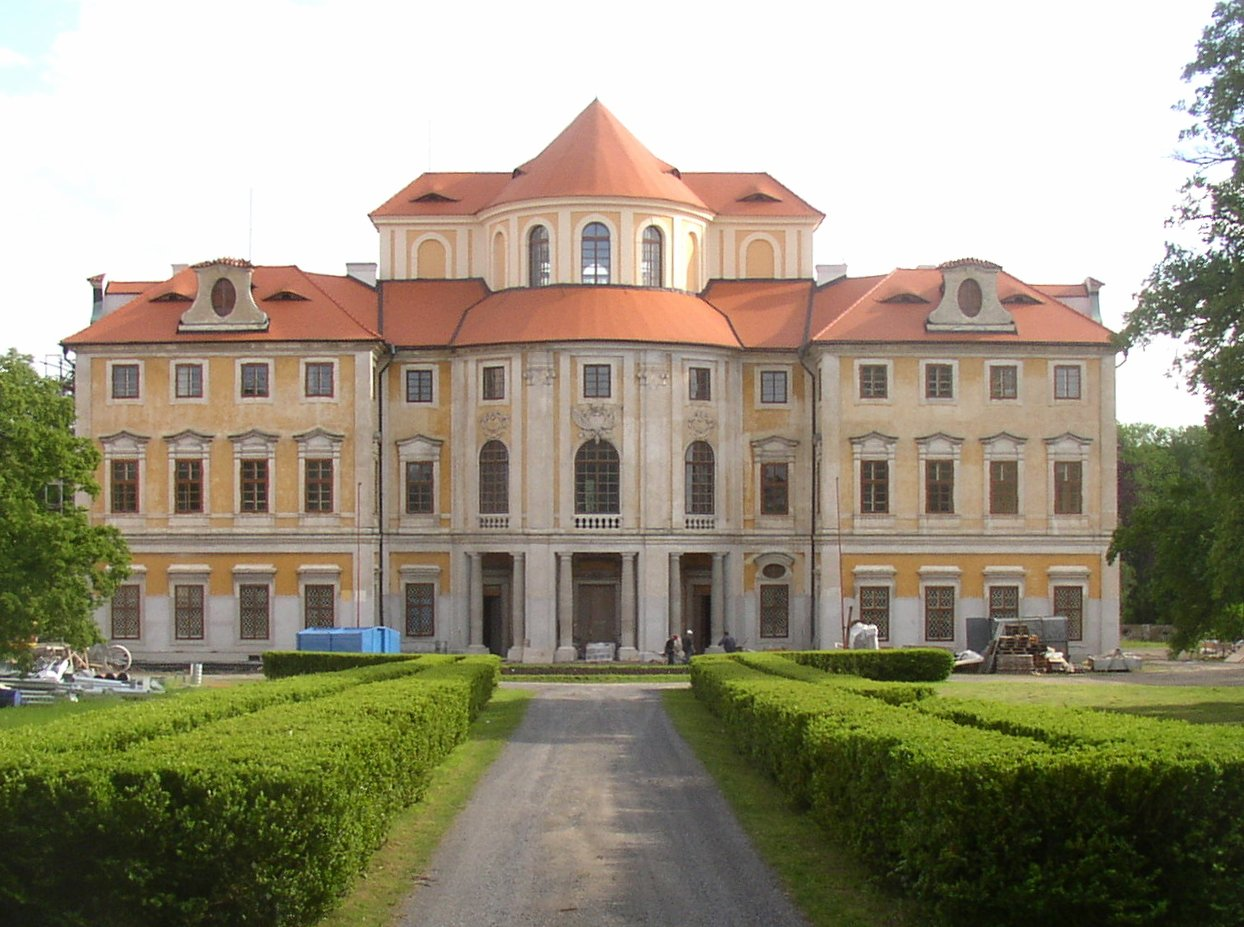
Liblice

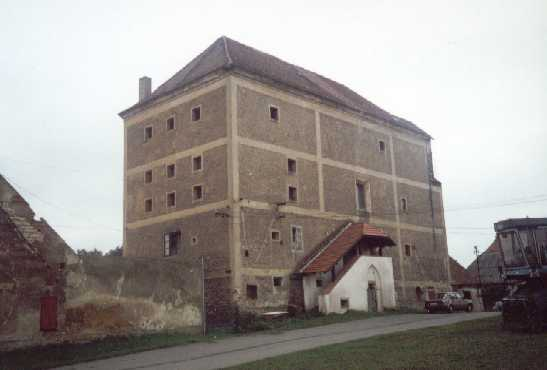
Litovice

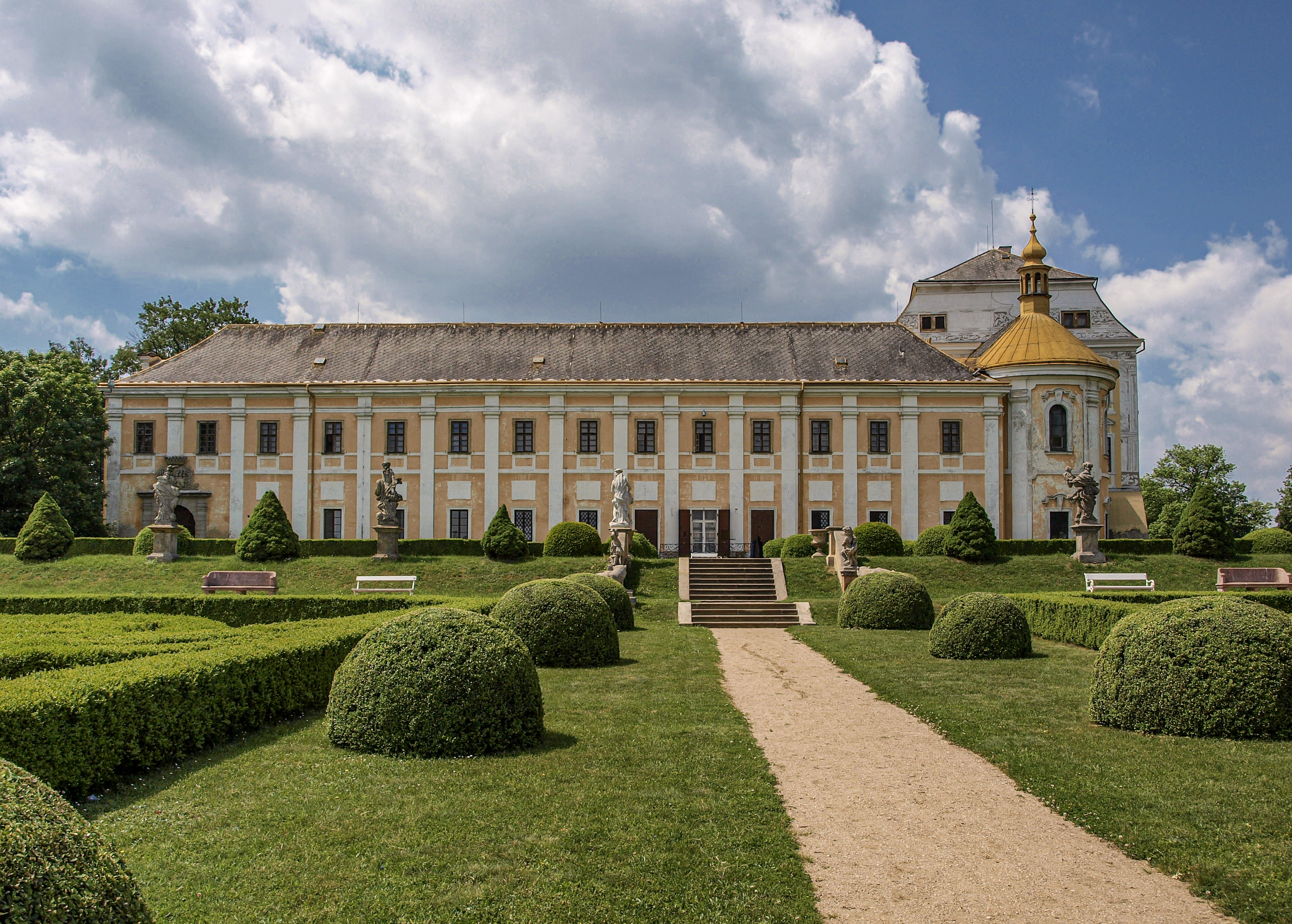
Lysá nad Labem

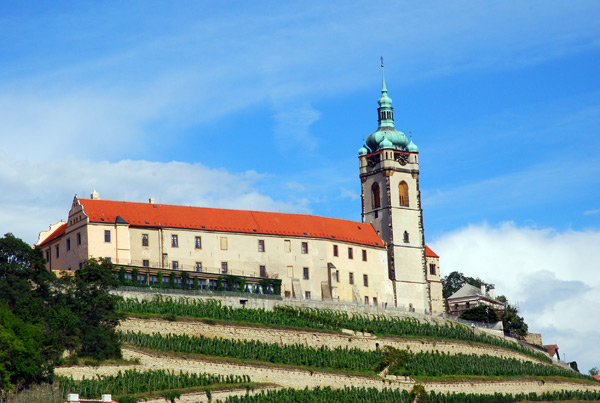
Mělník

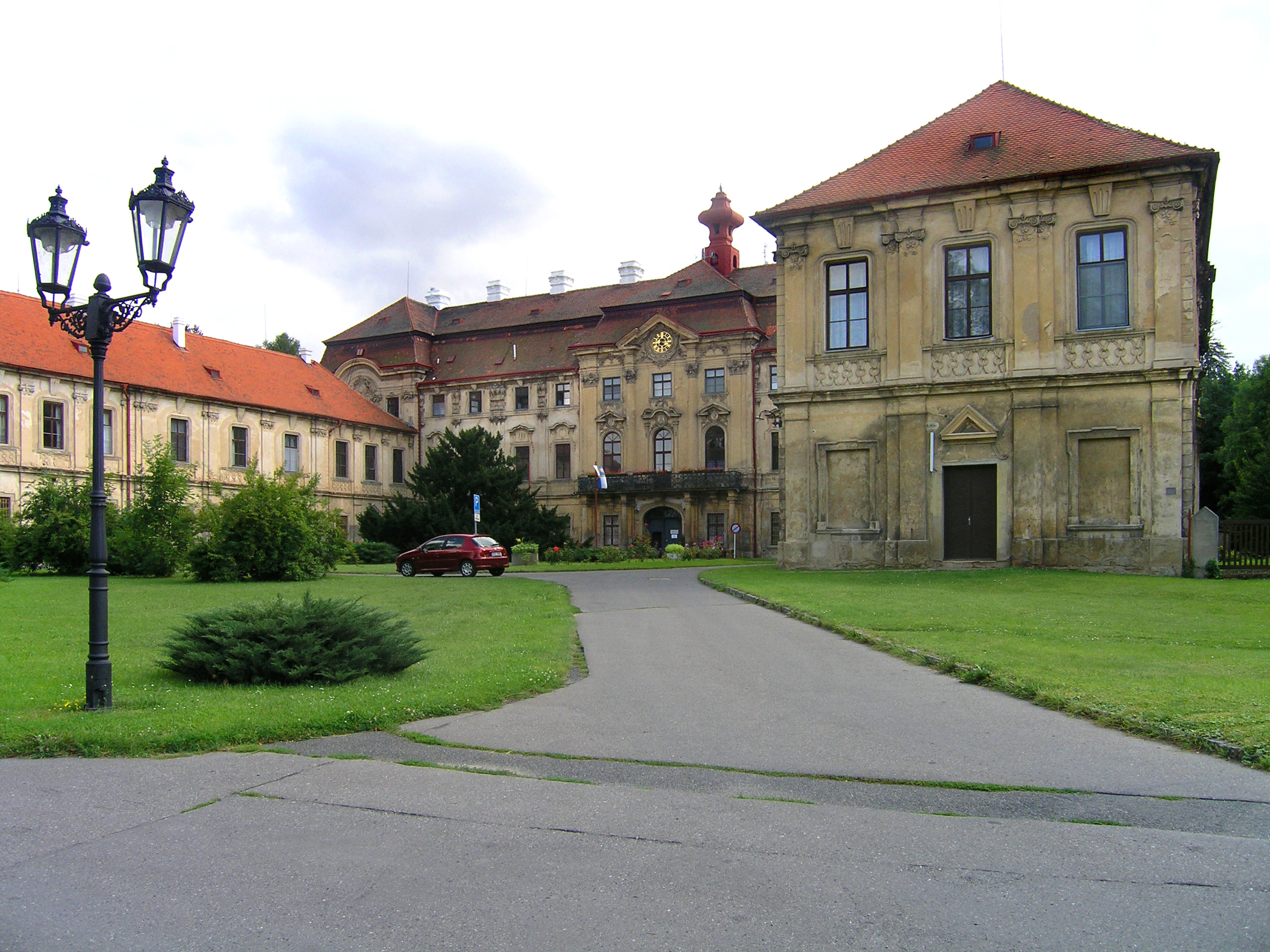
Měšice

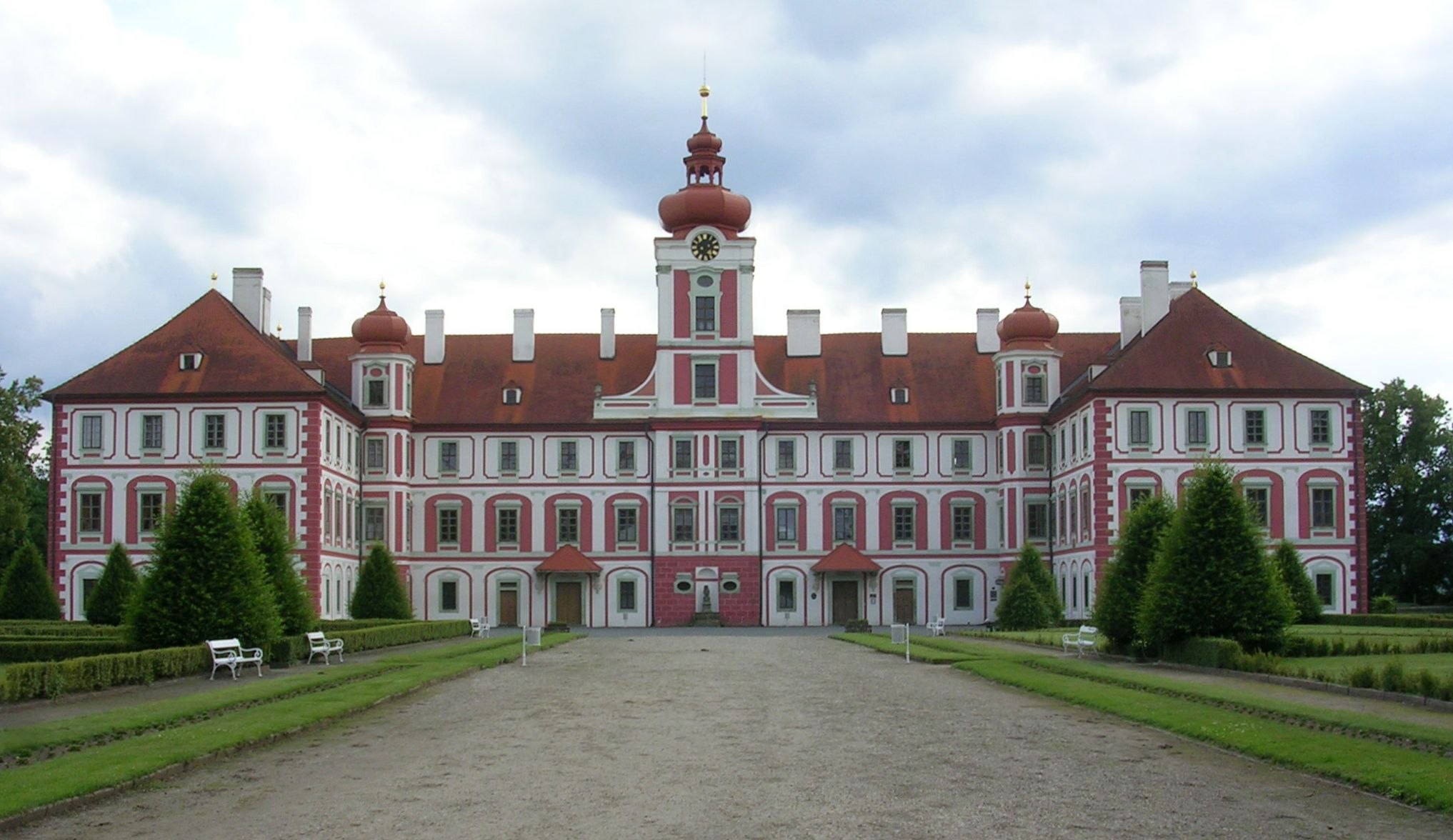
Mnichovo Hradiště

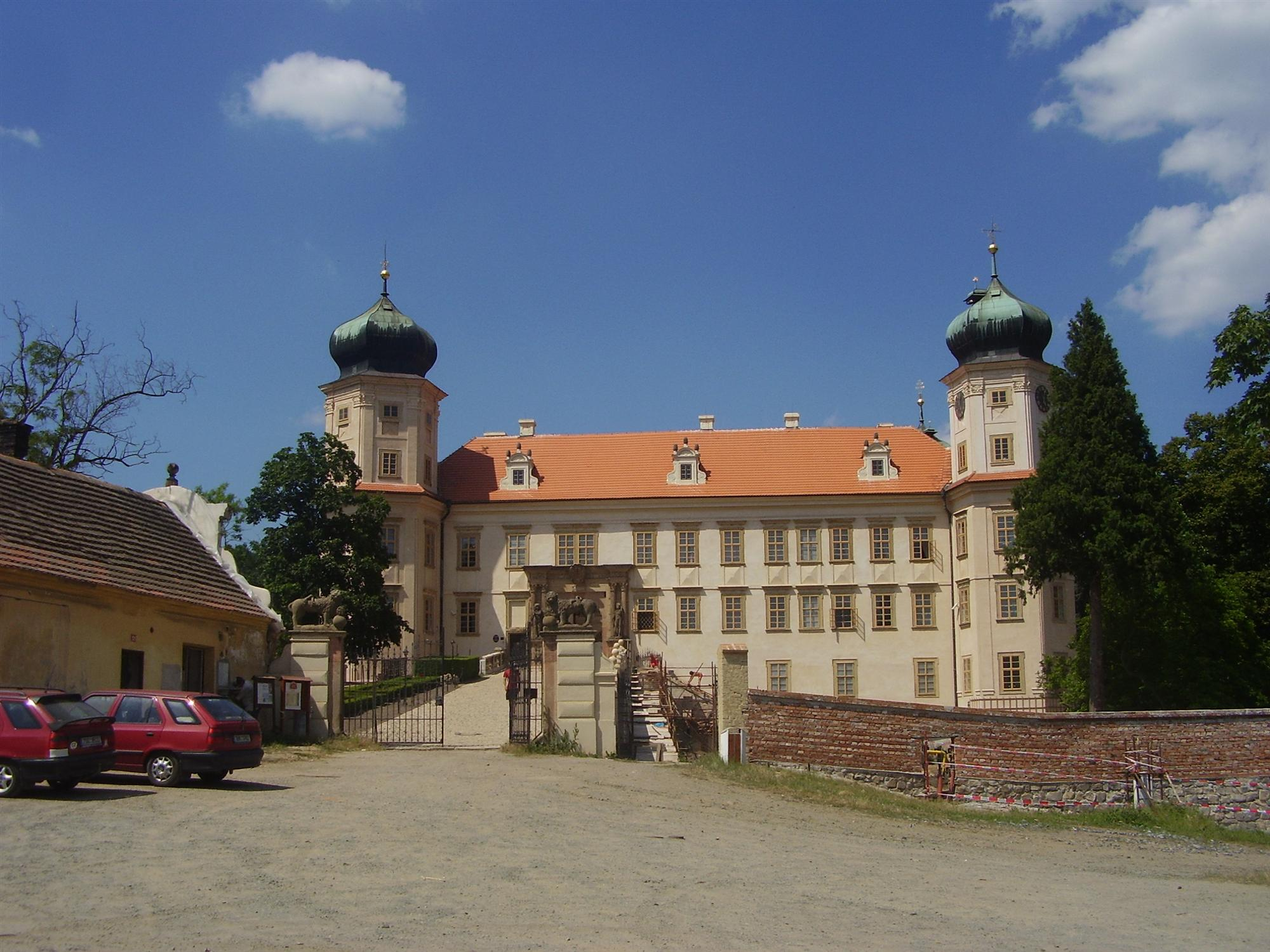
Mníšek pod Brdy

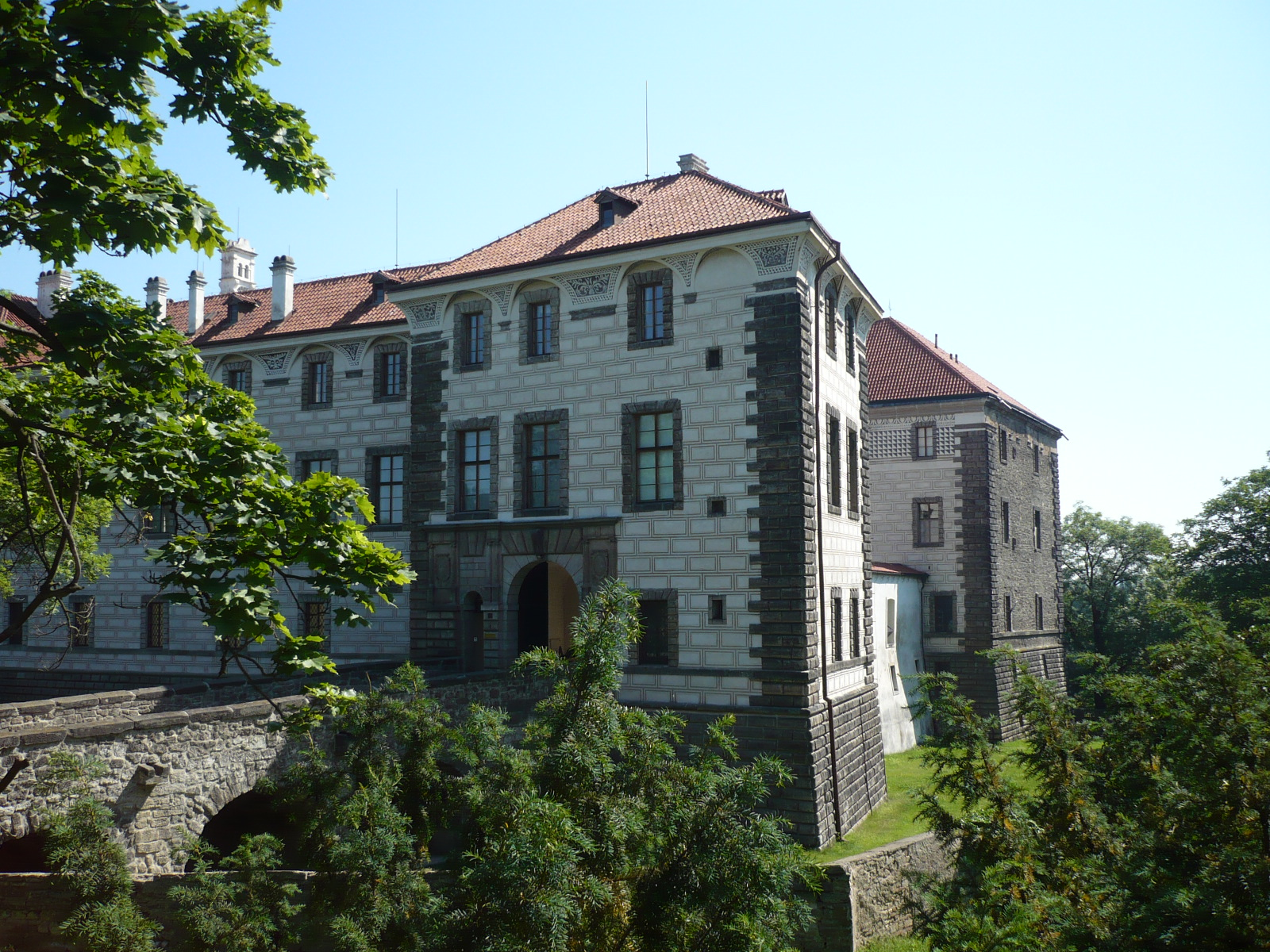
Nelahozeves

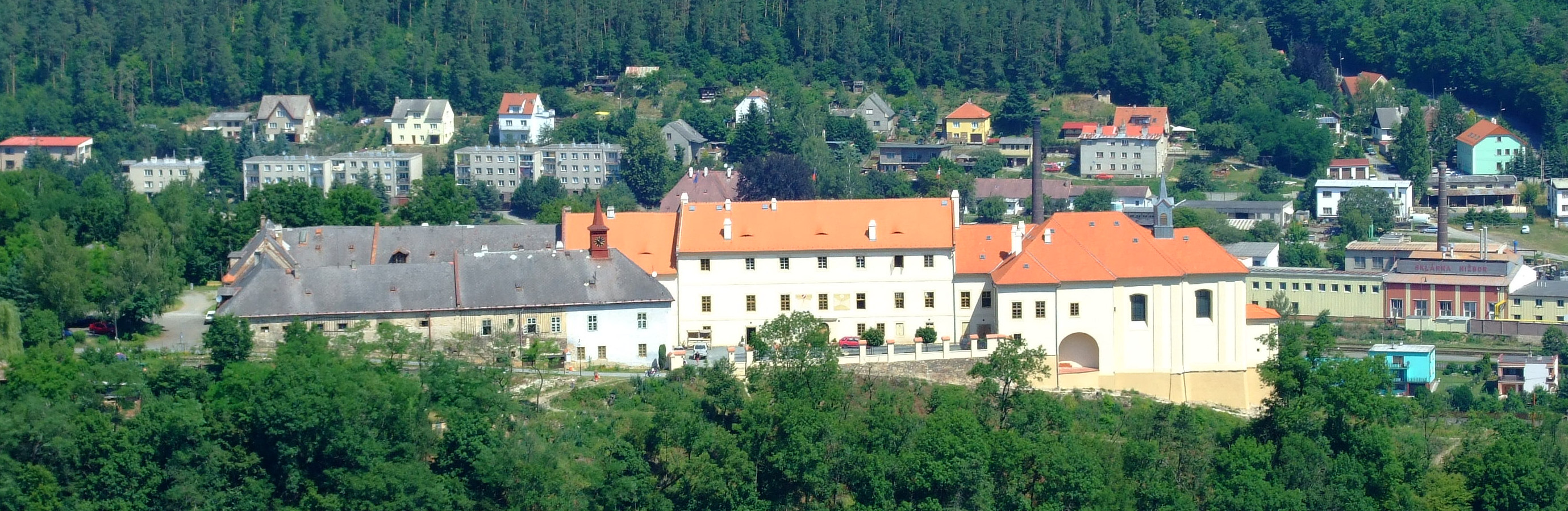
Nižbor

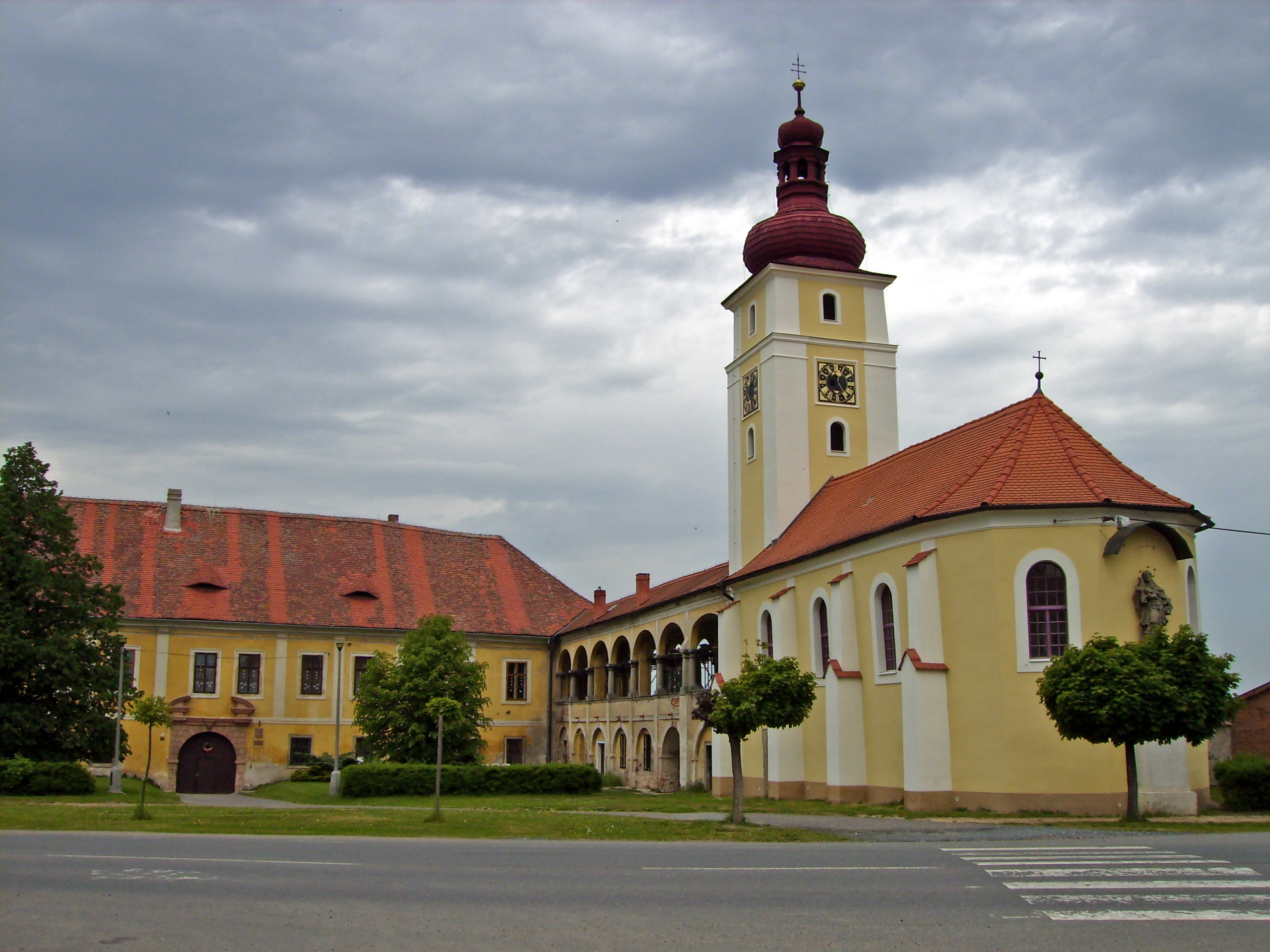
Nové Dvory

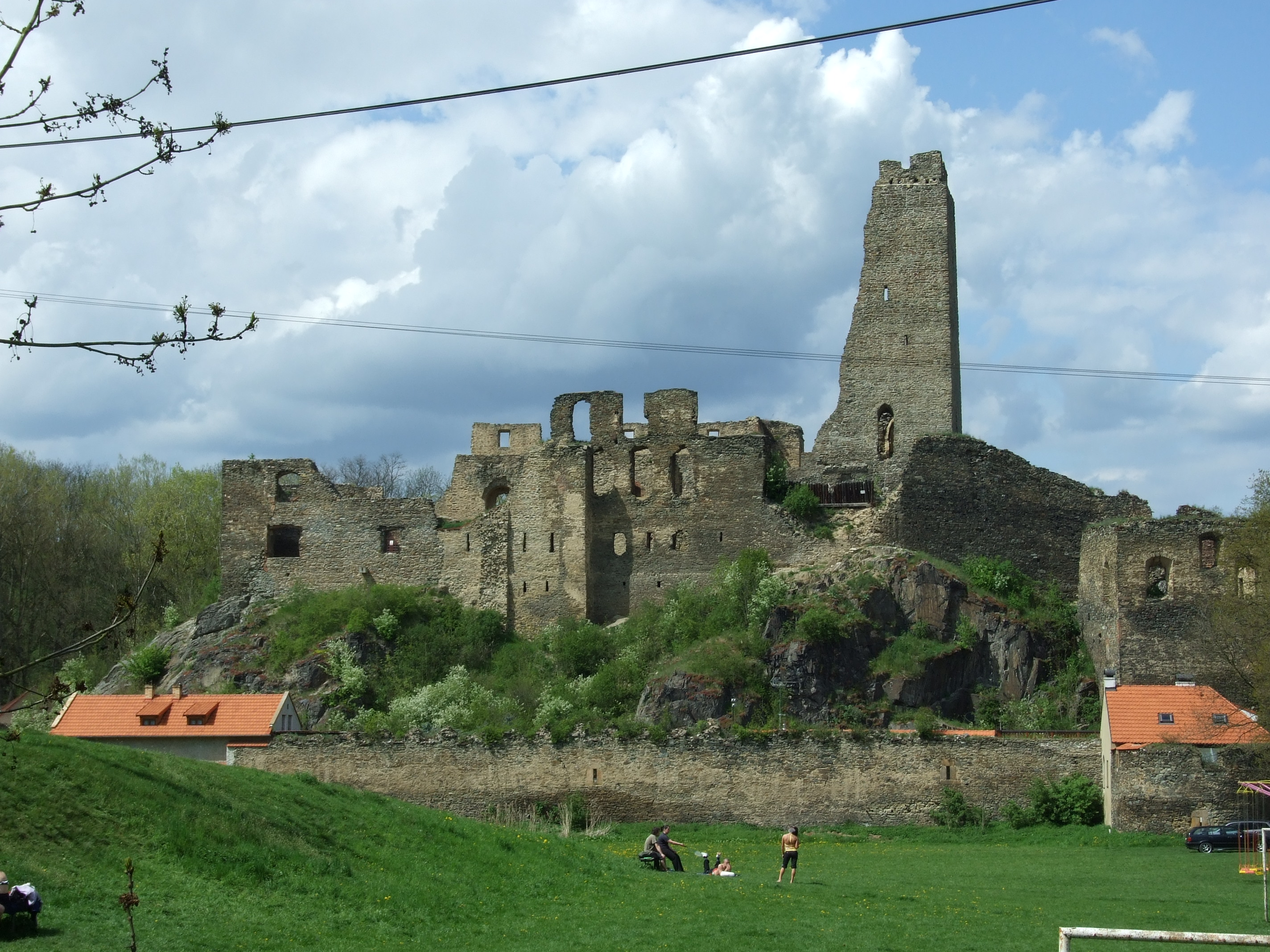
Okoř

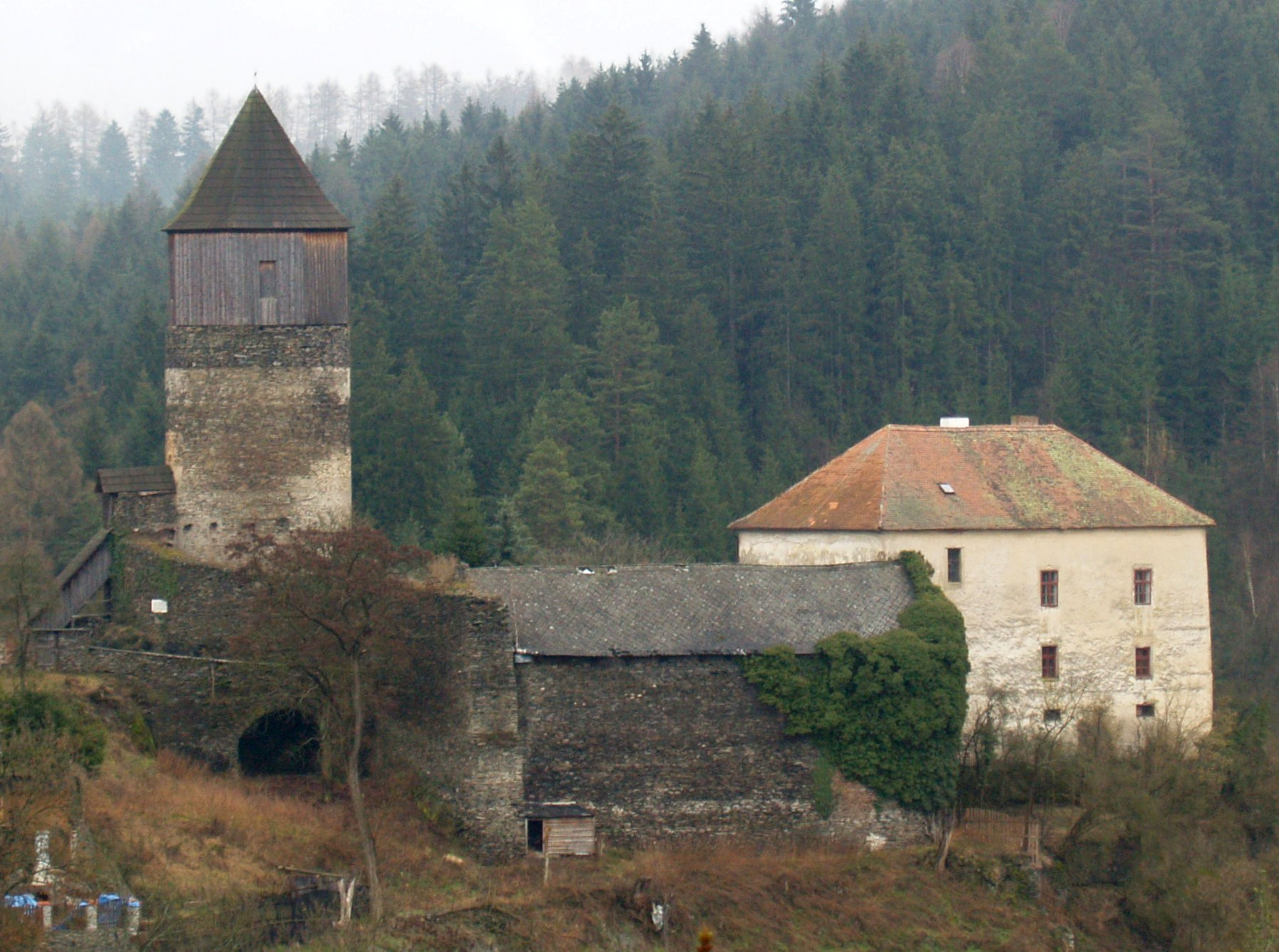
Pirkštejn

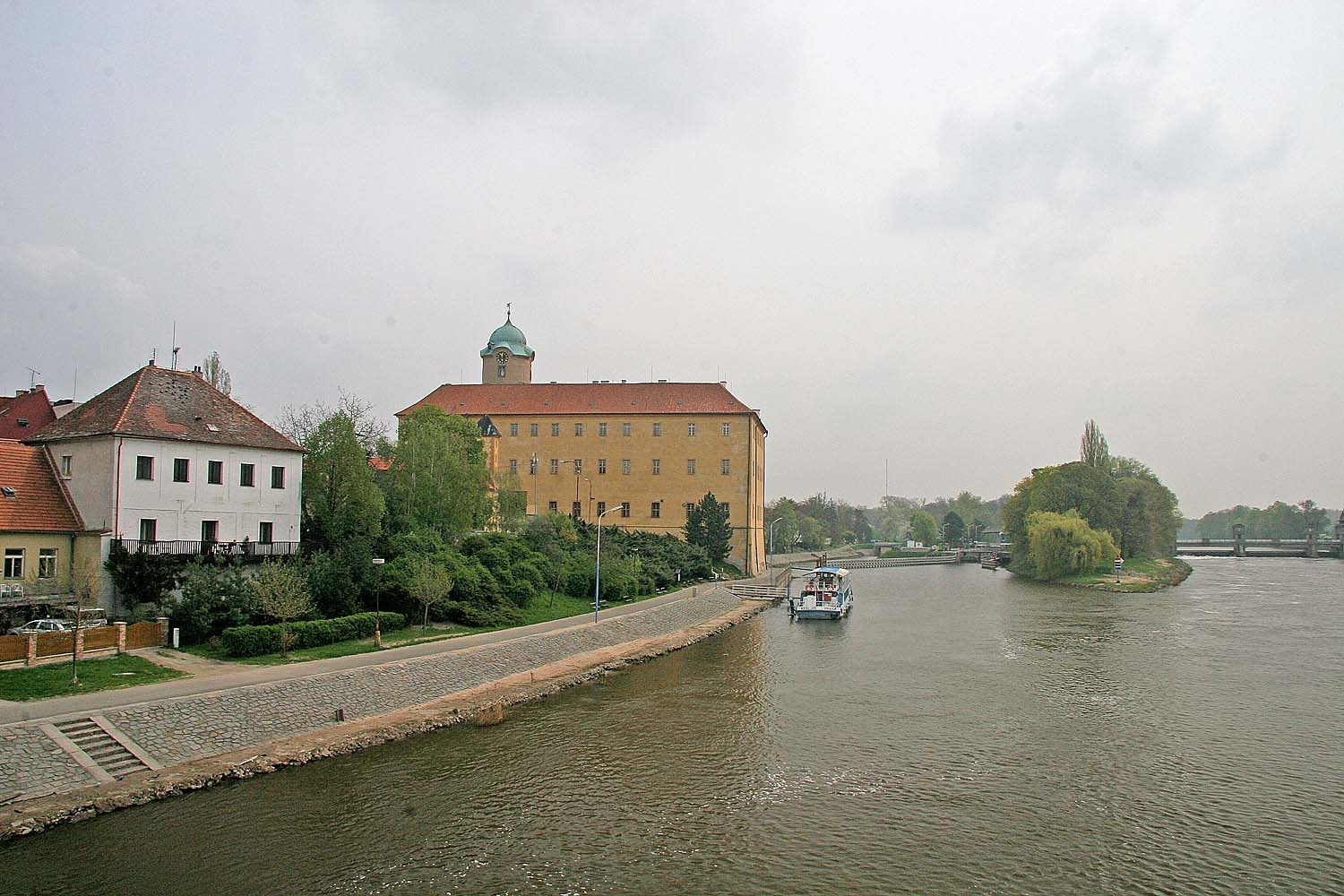
Poděbrady

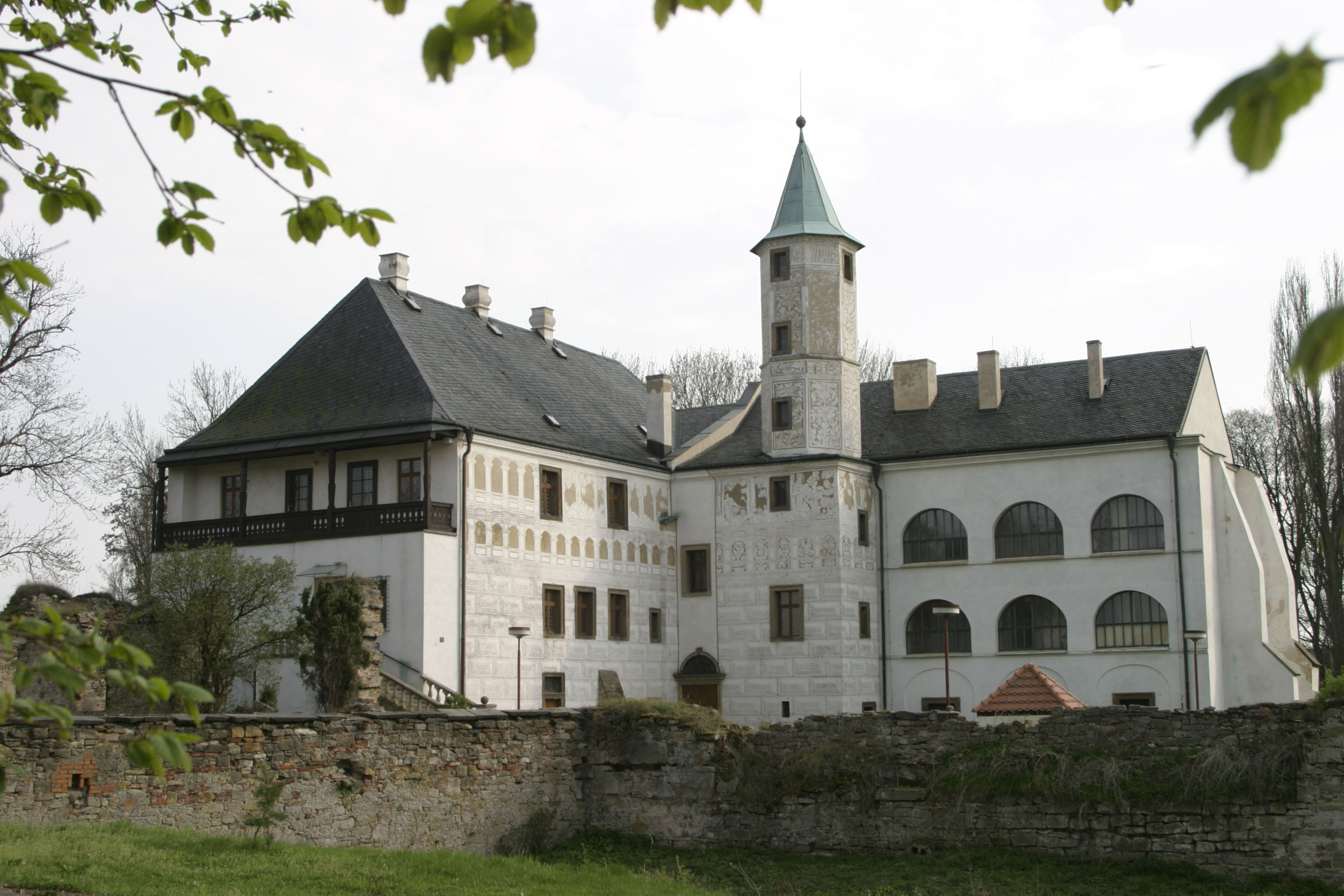
Přerov nad Labem

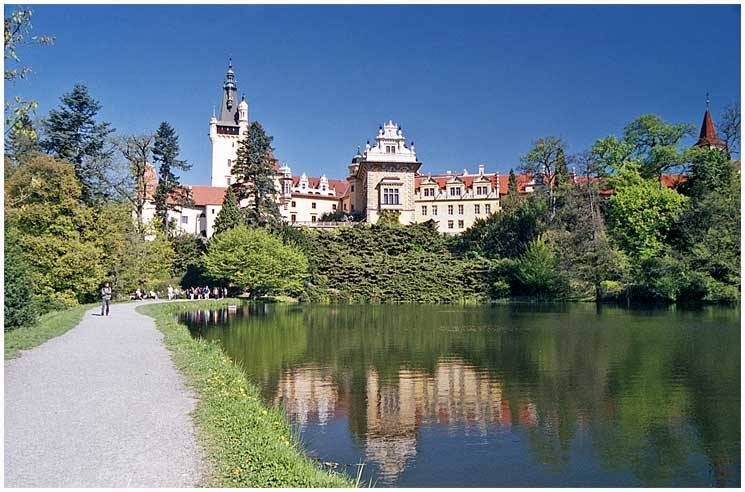
Průhonice

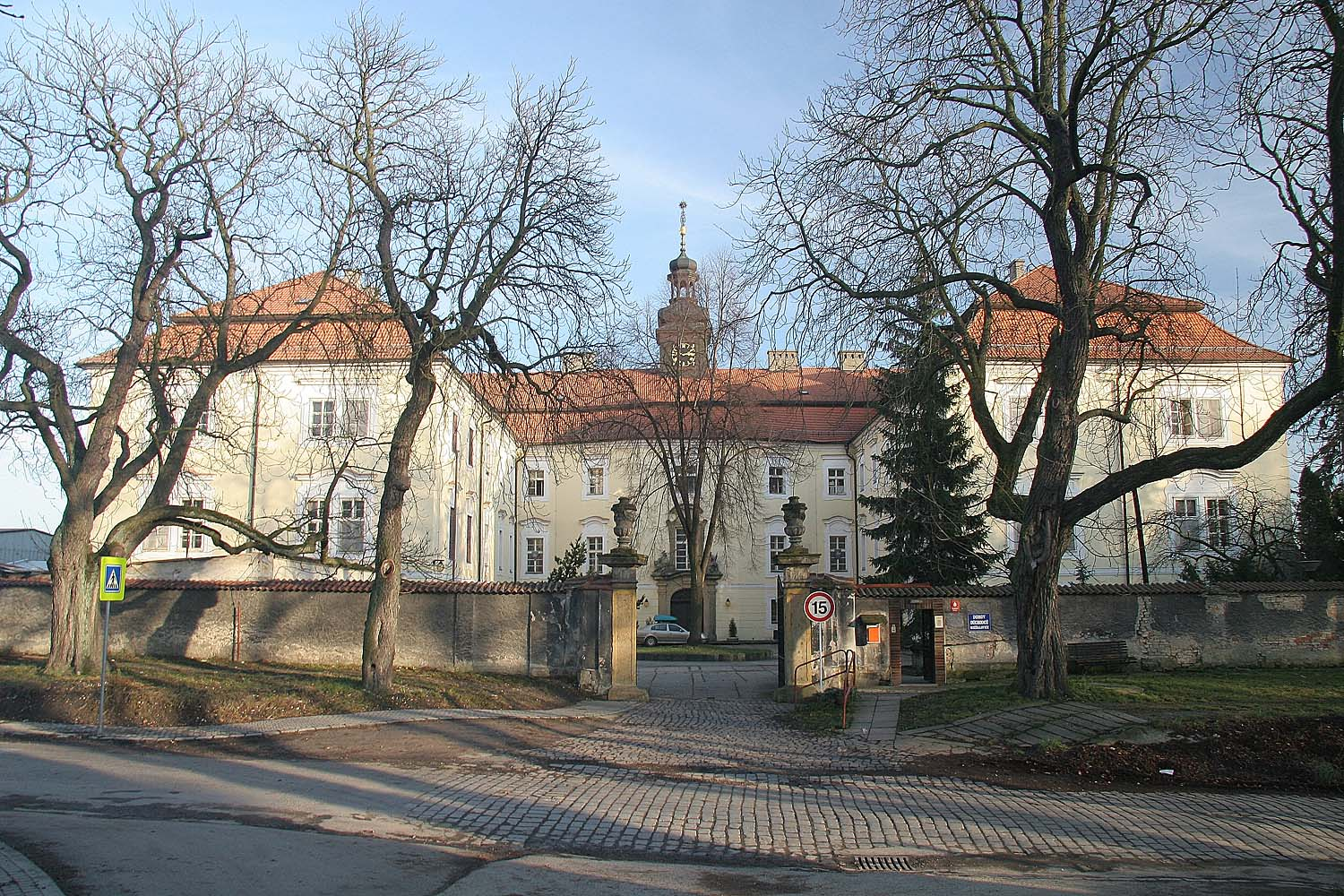
Rožďalovice

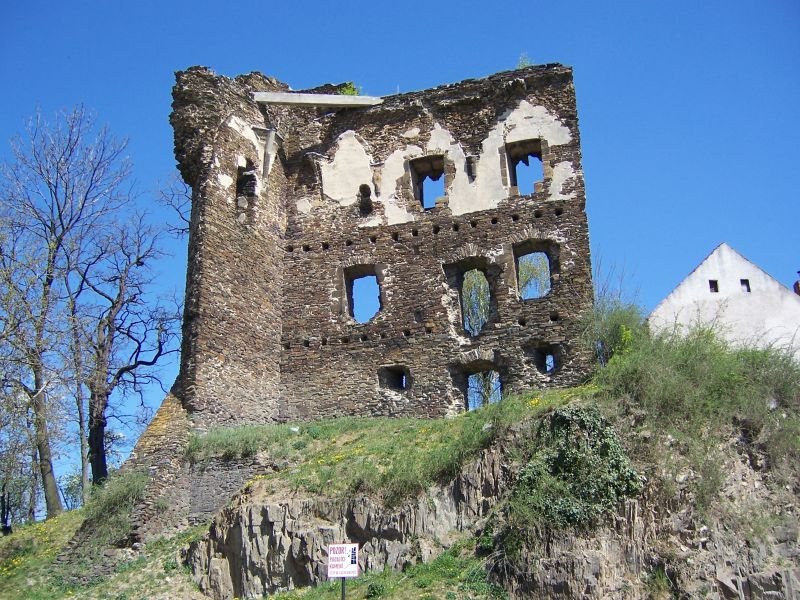
Říčany

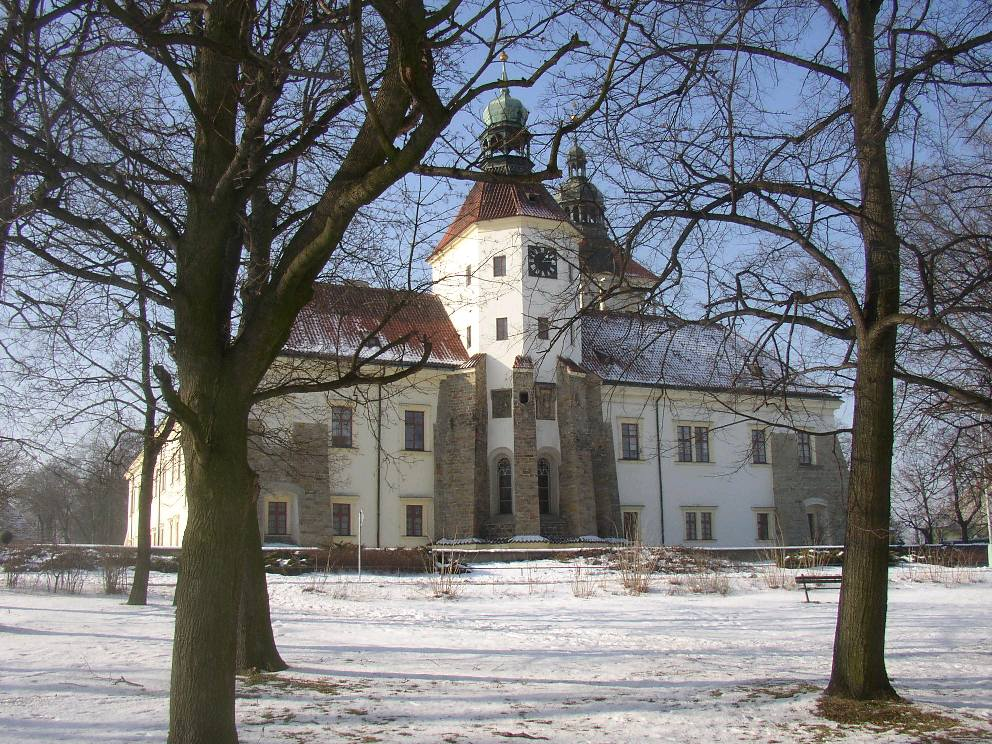
Smečno

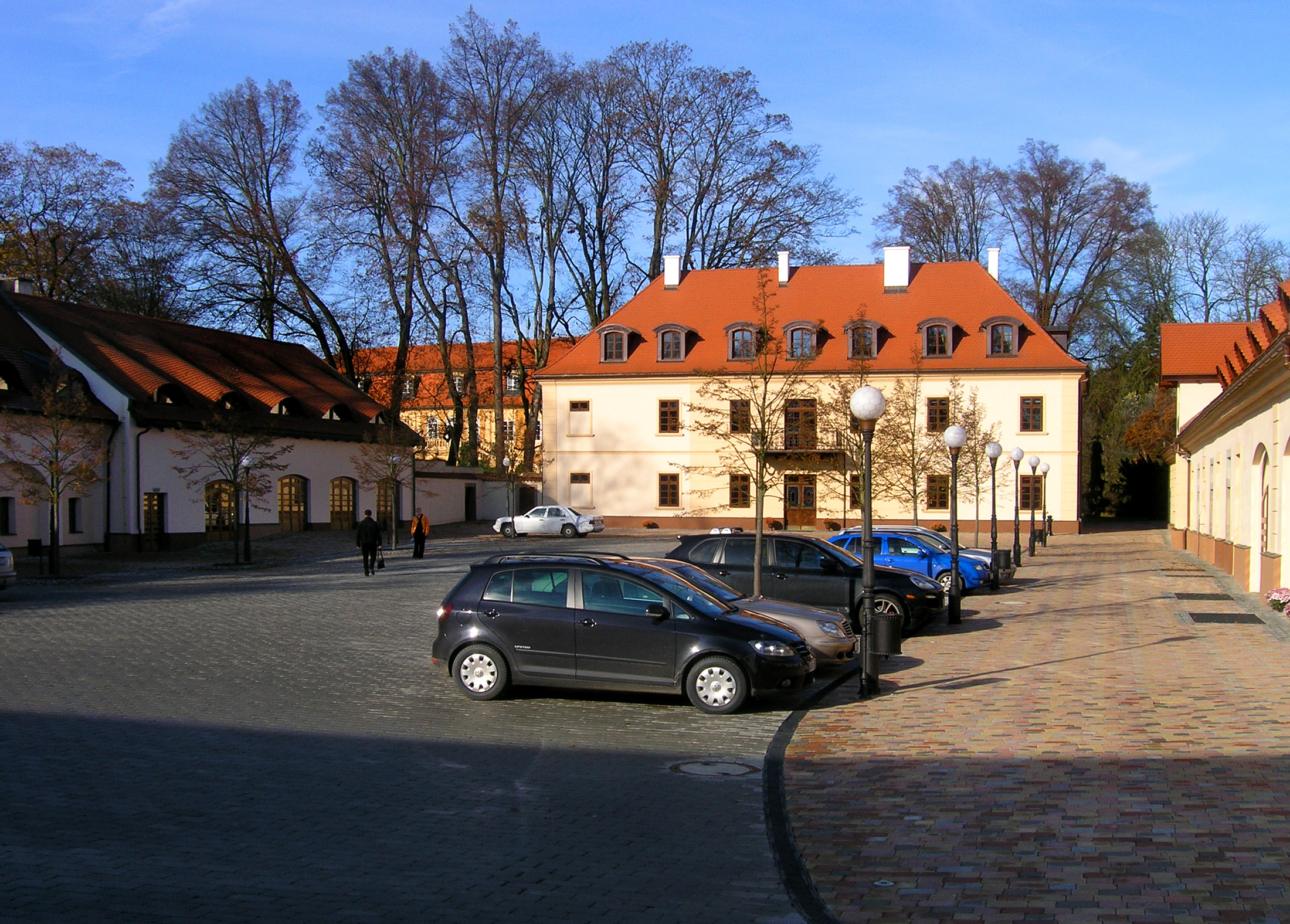
Štiřín

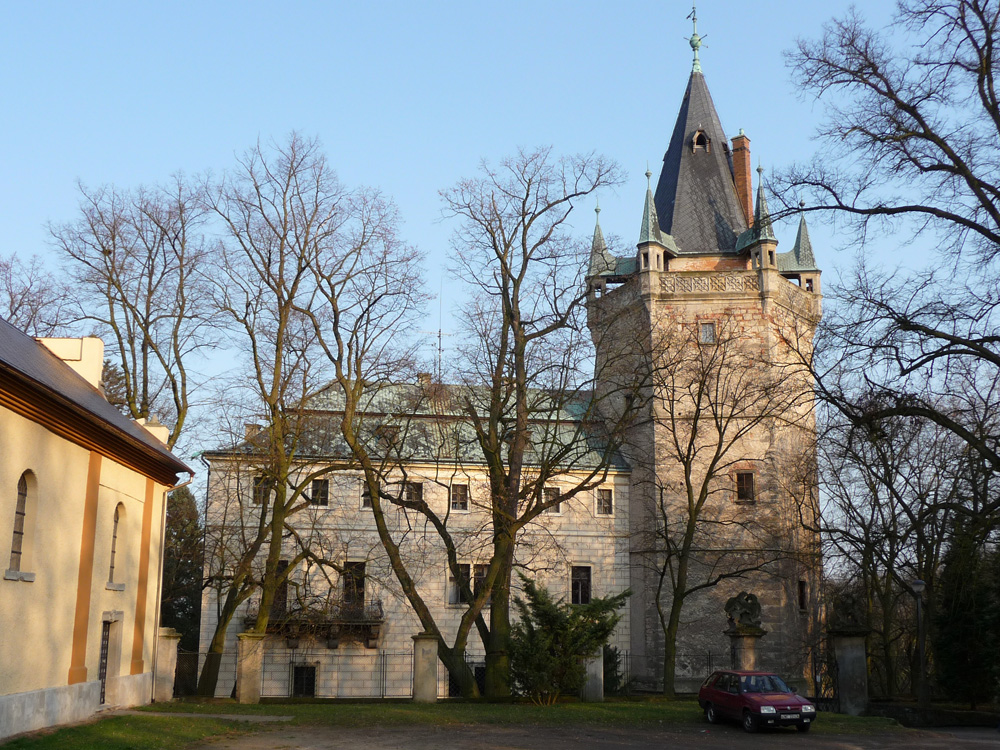
Stránov

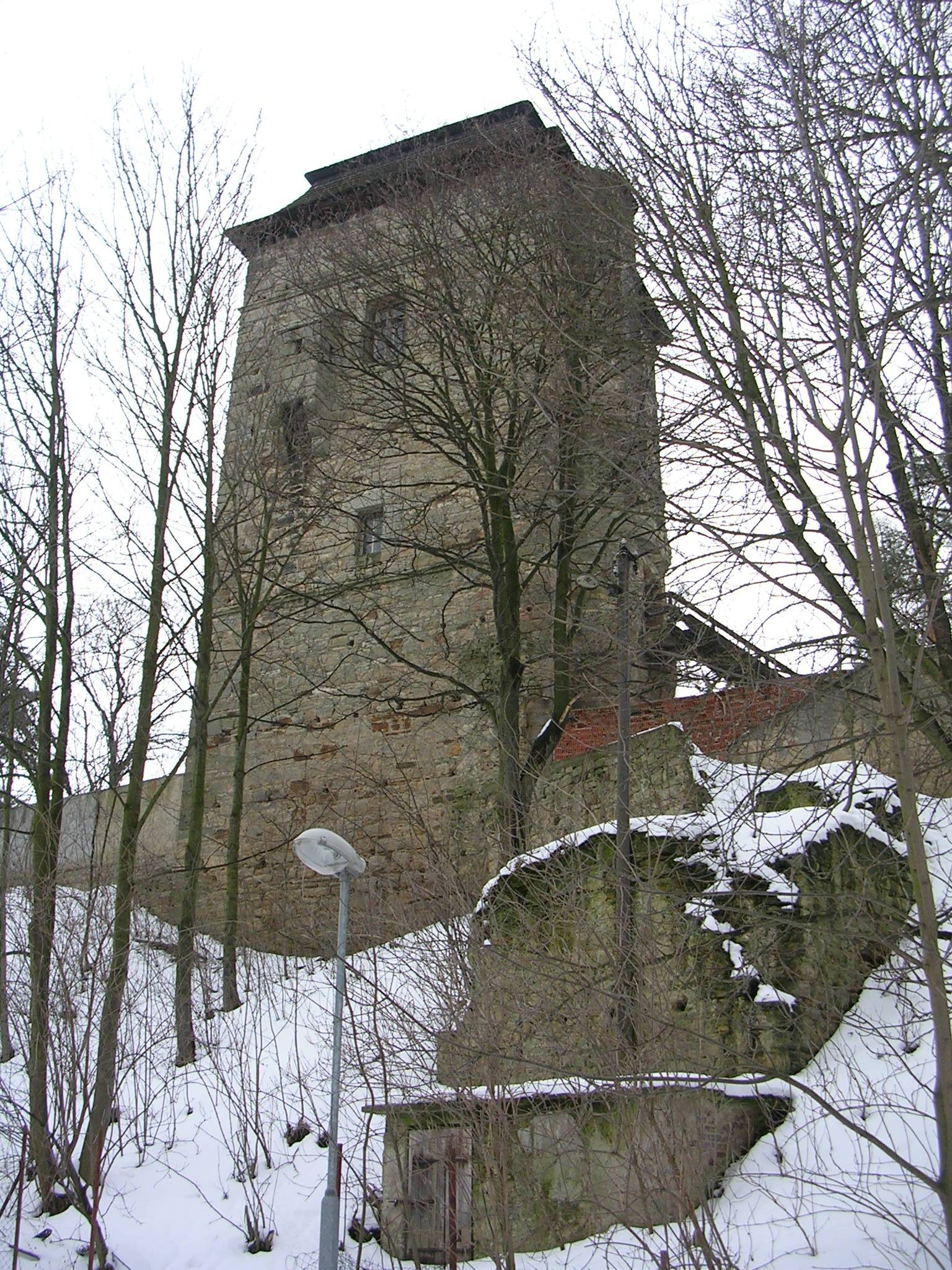
Tuchoraz

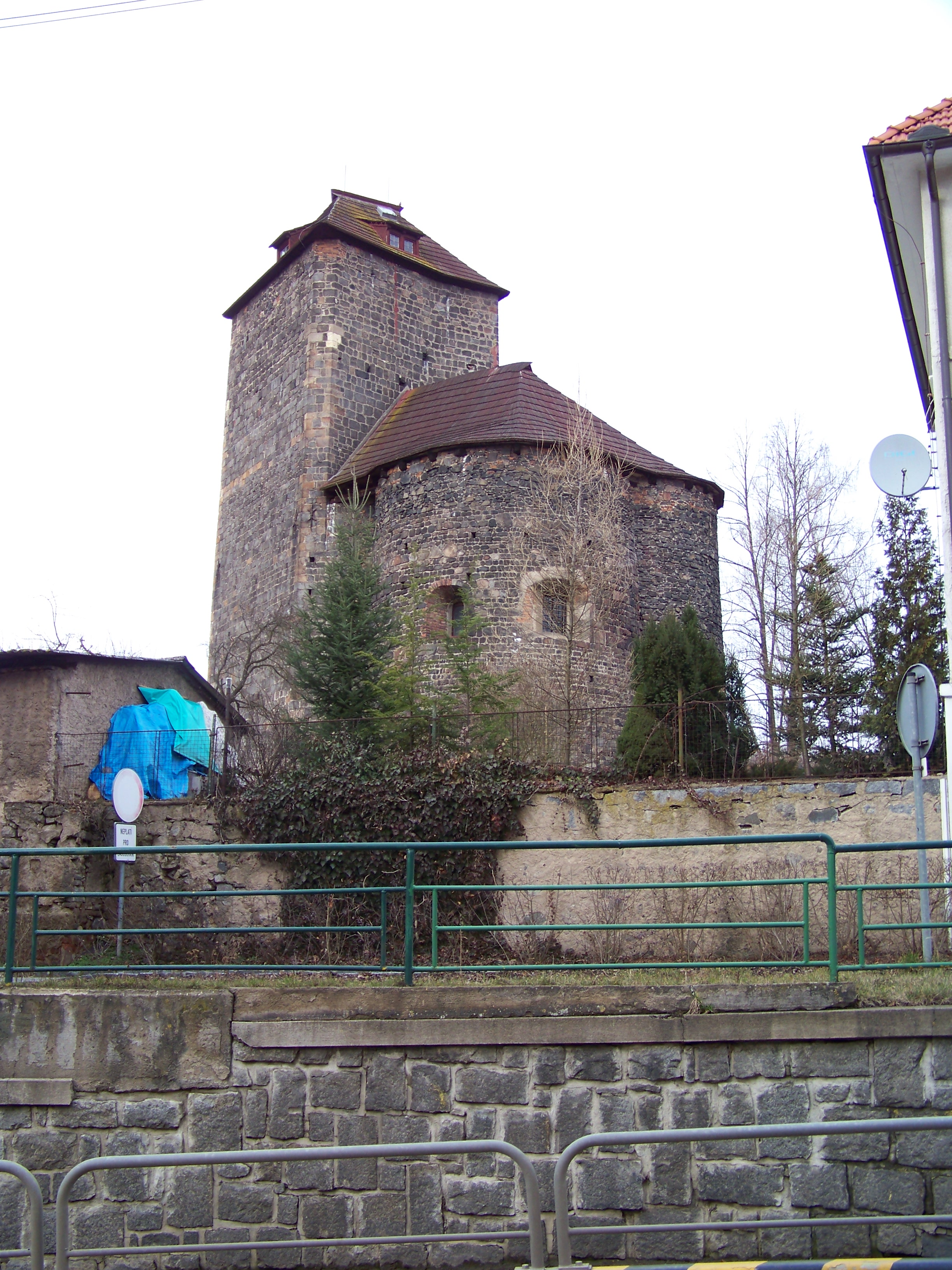
Týnec nad Sázavou

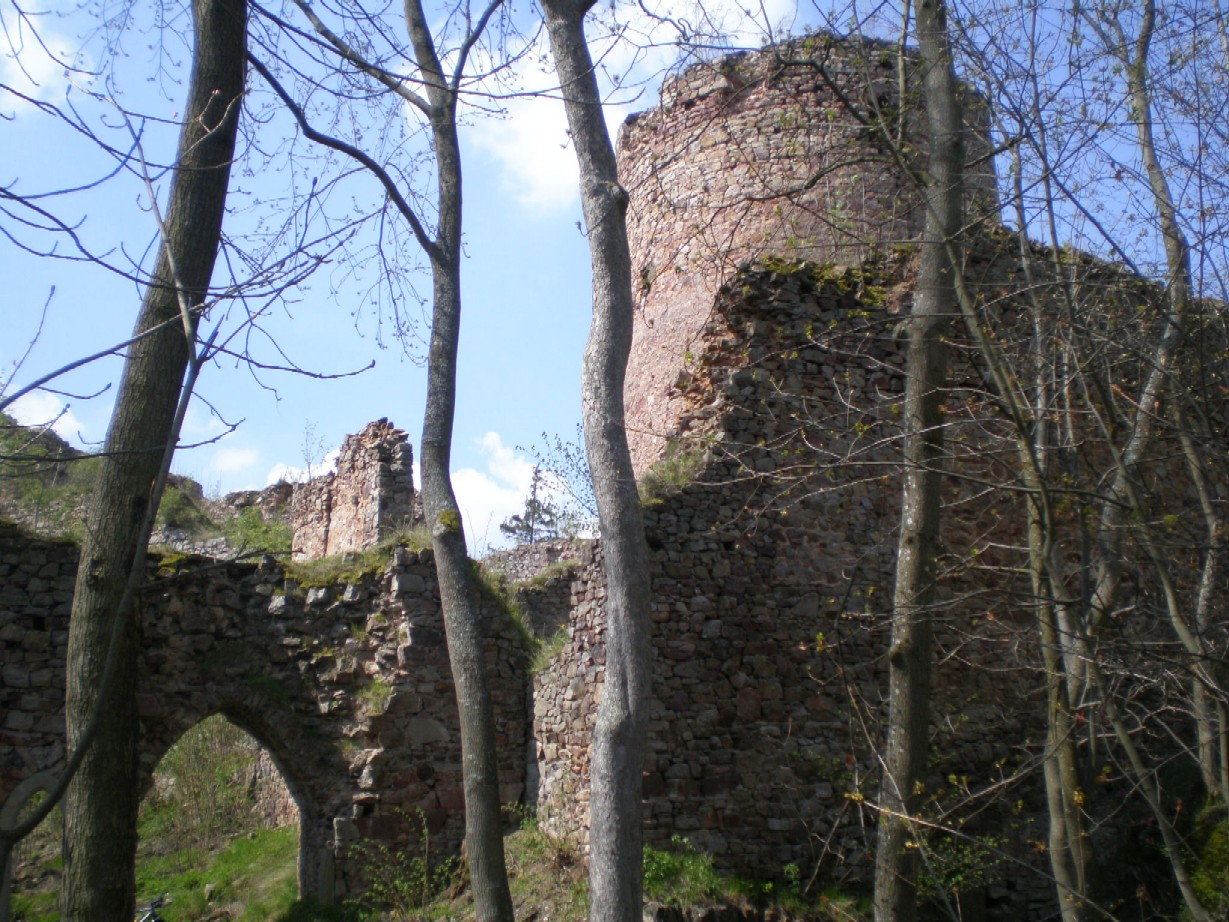
Valdek

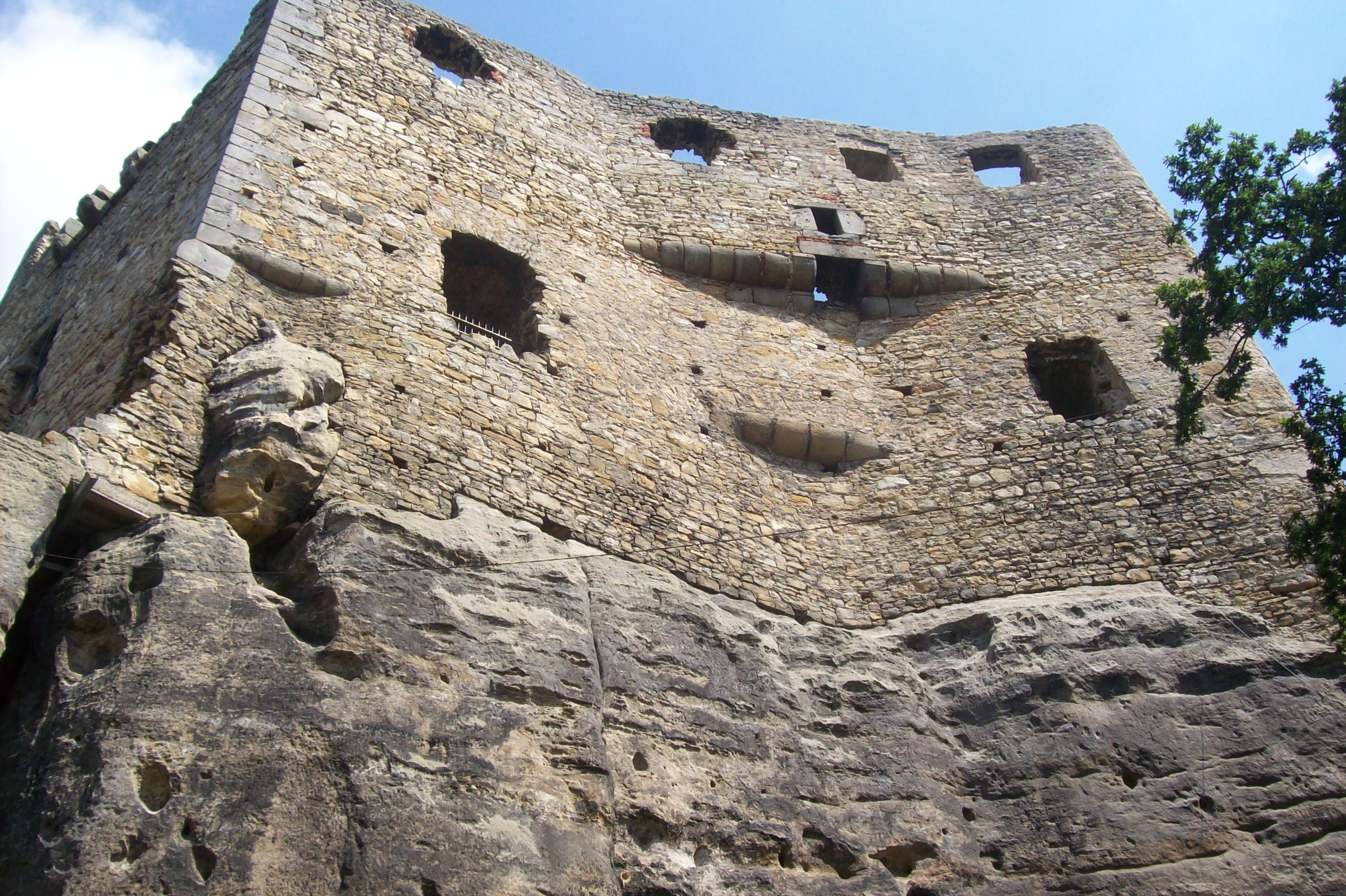
Valečov

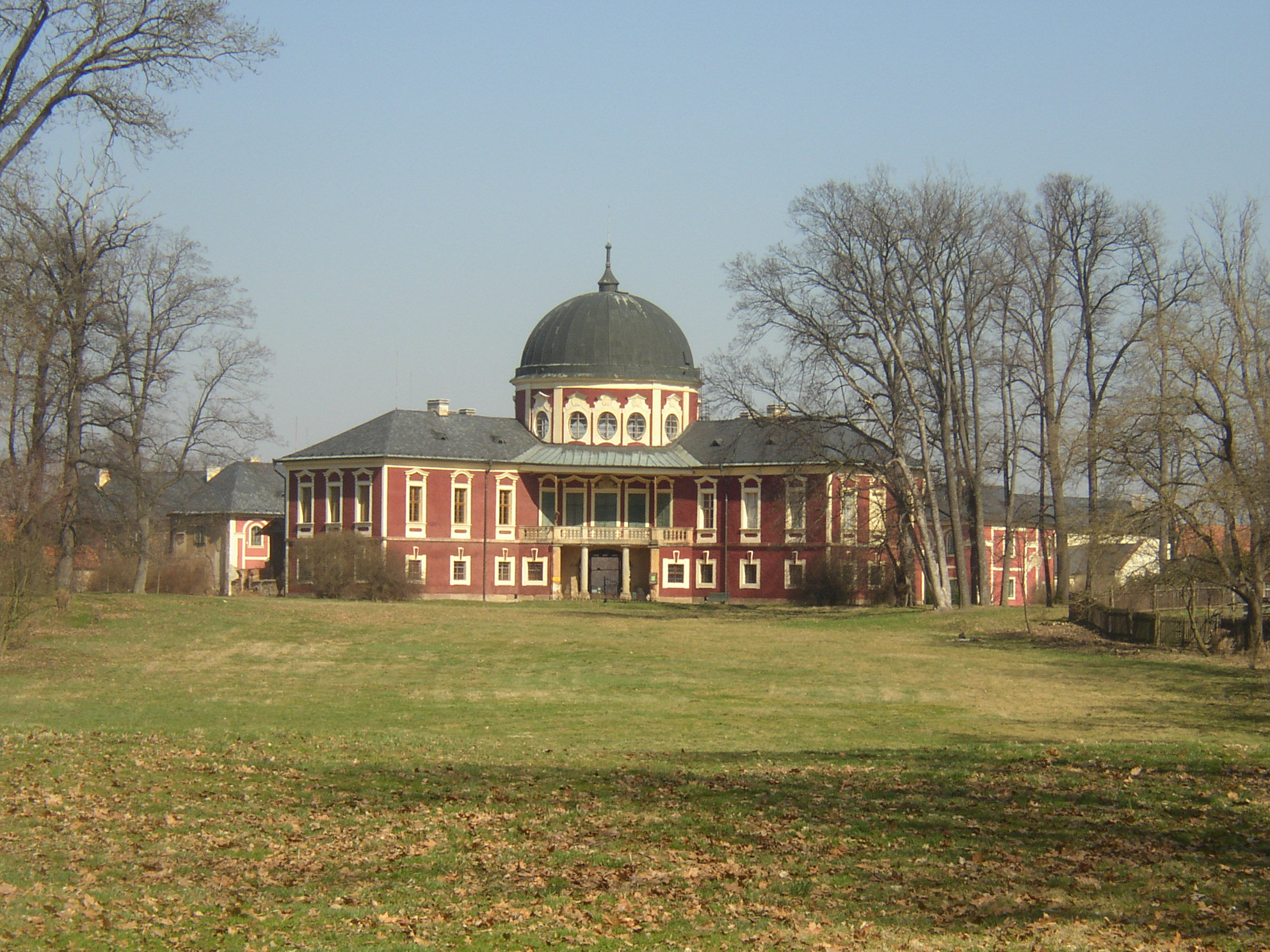
Veltrusy

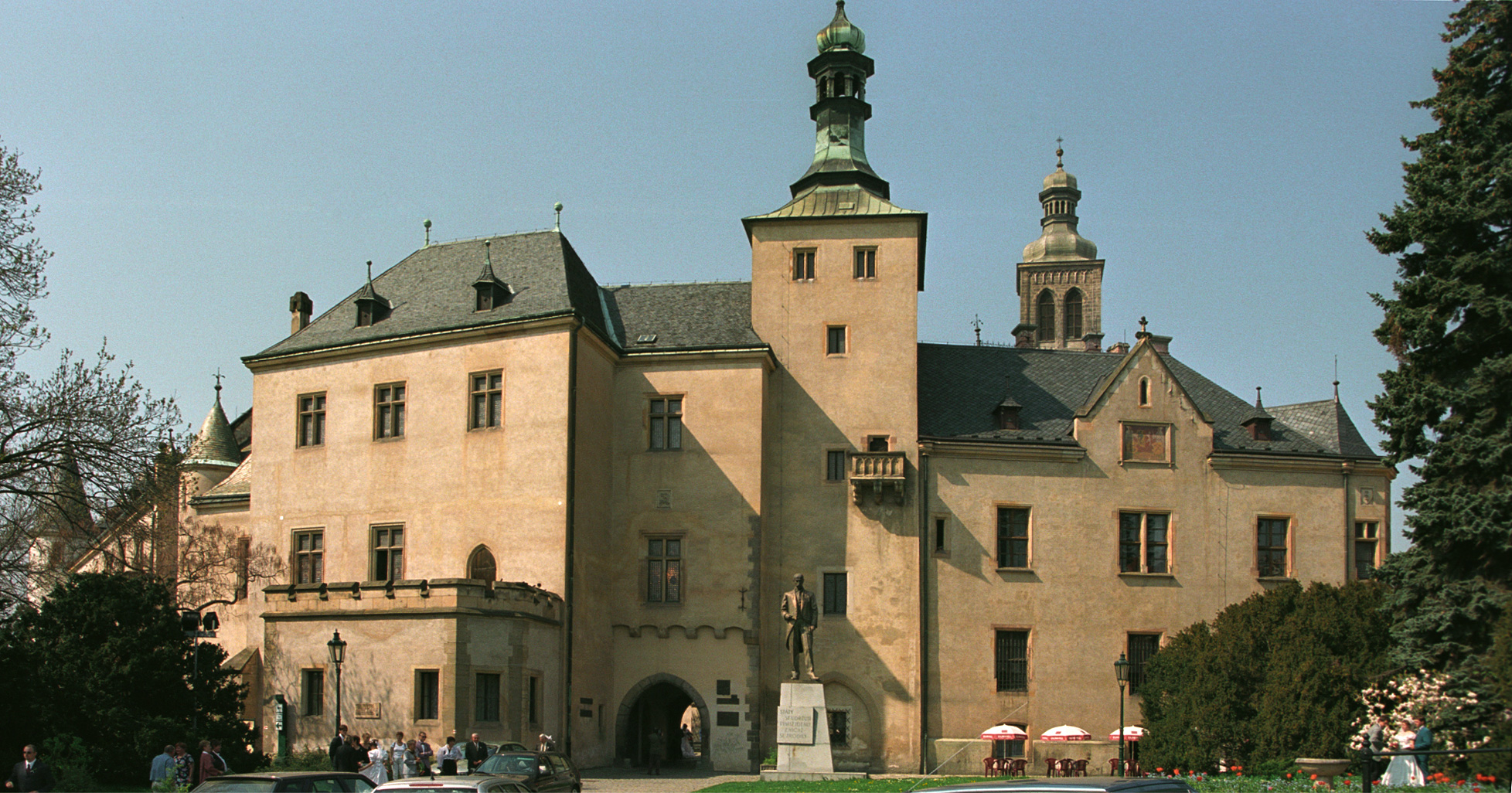
Vlašský dvůr (Italian Court) in Kutná Hora

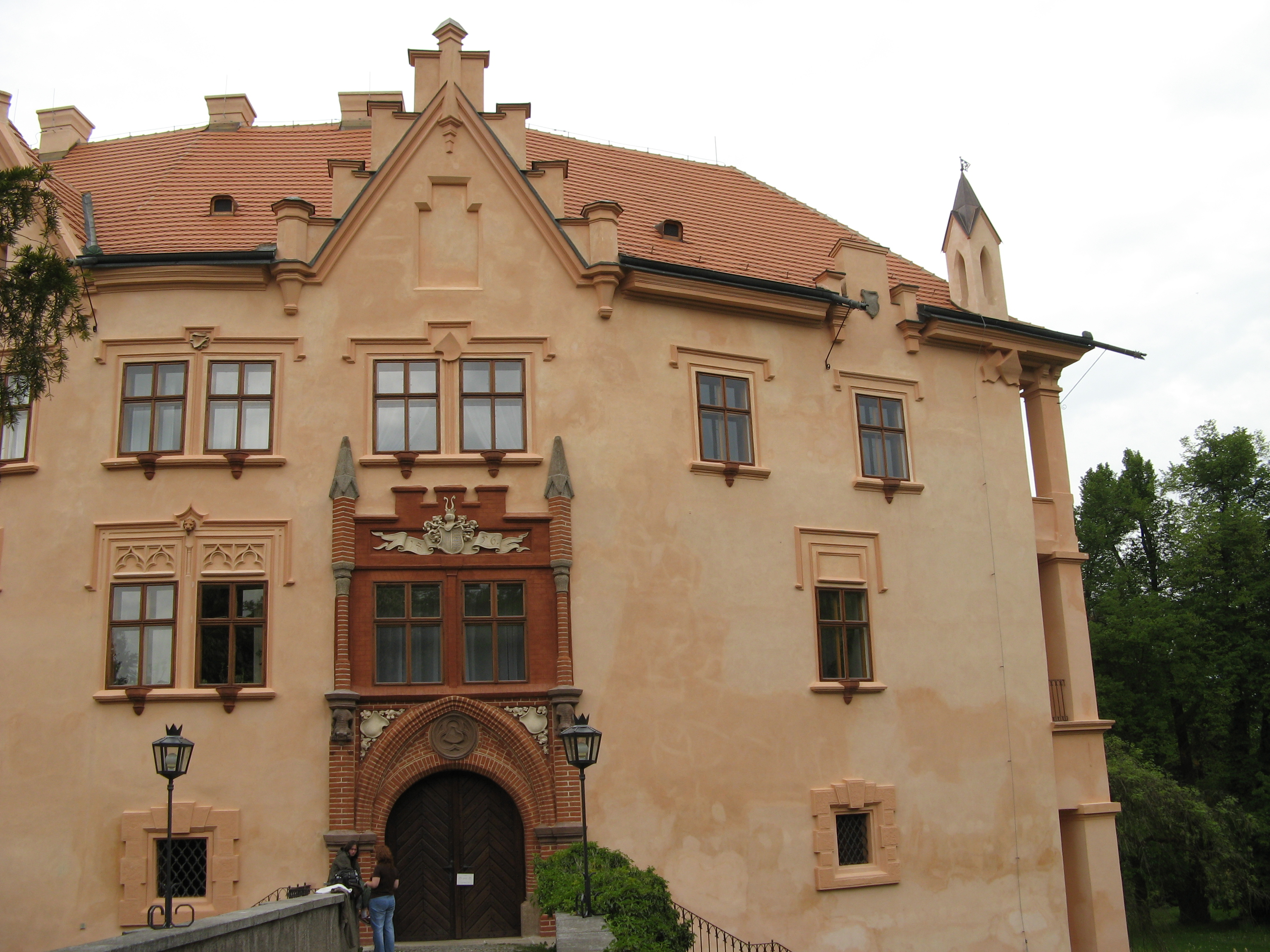
Vrchotovy Janovice

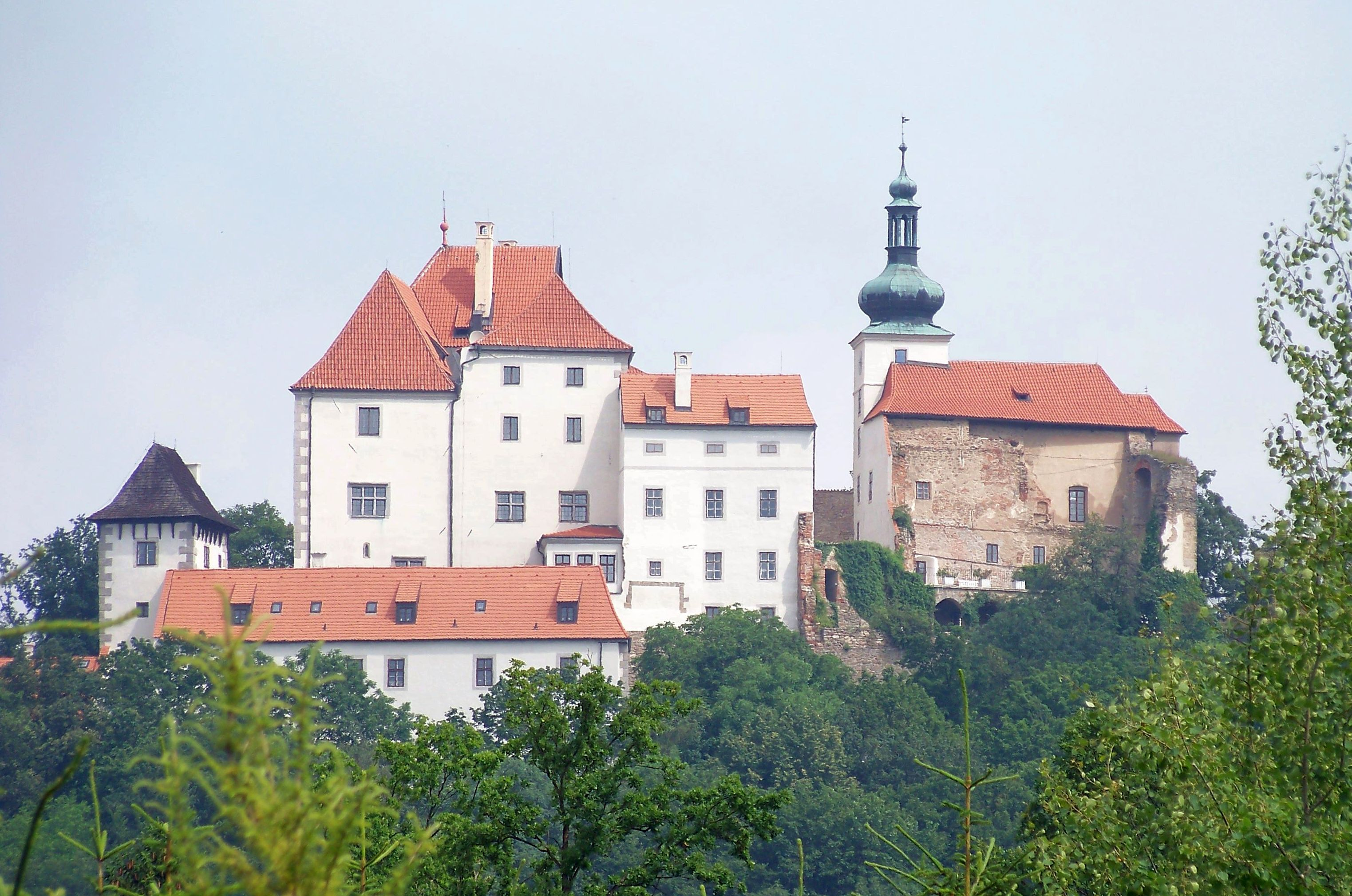
Vysoký Chlumec

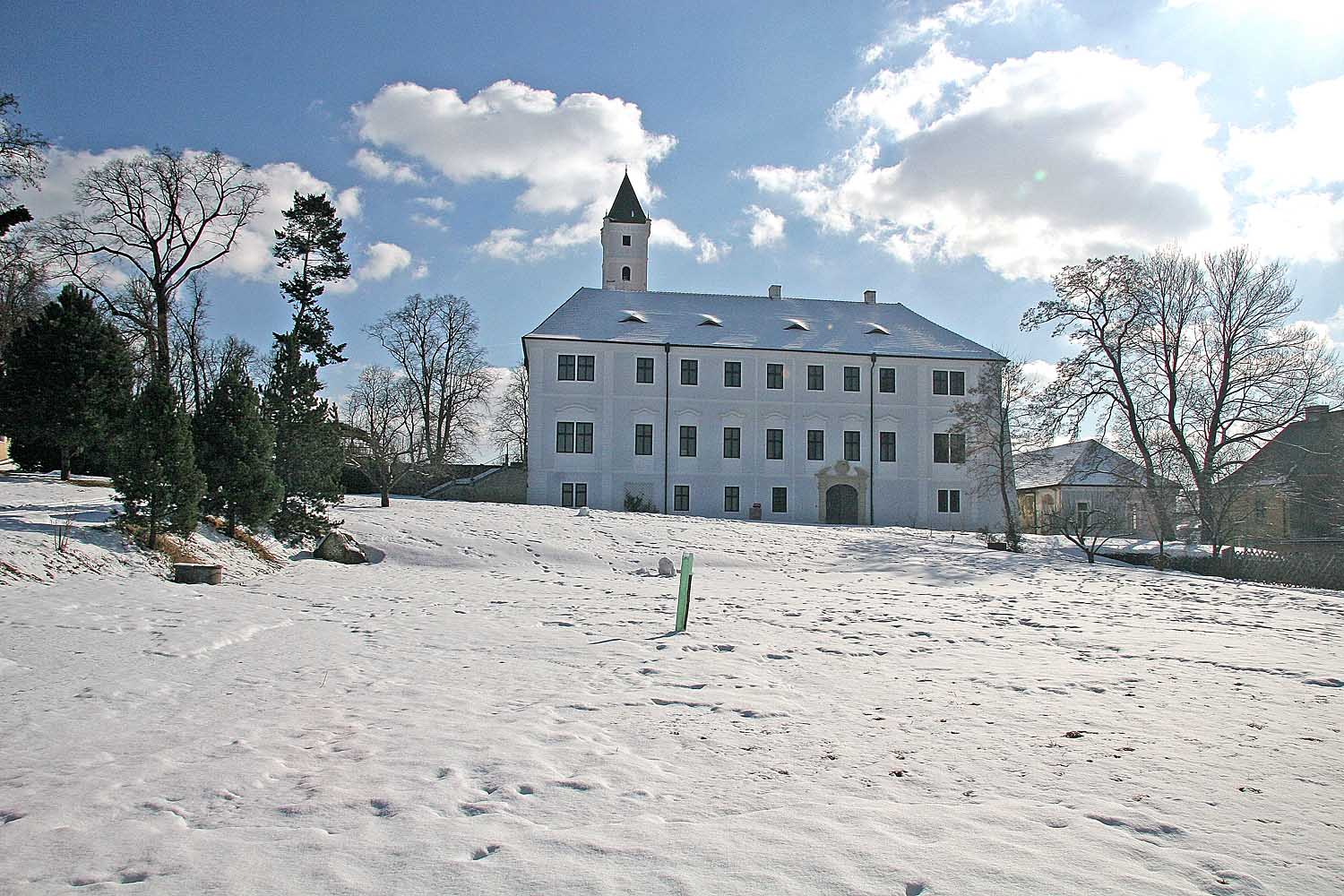
Zásmuky

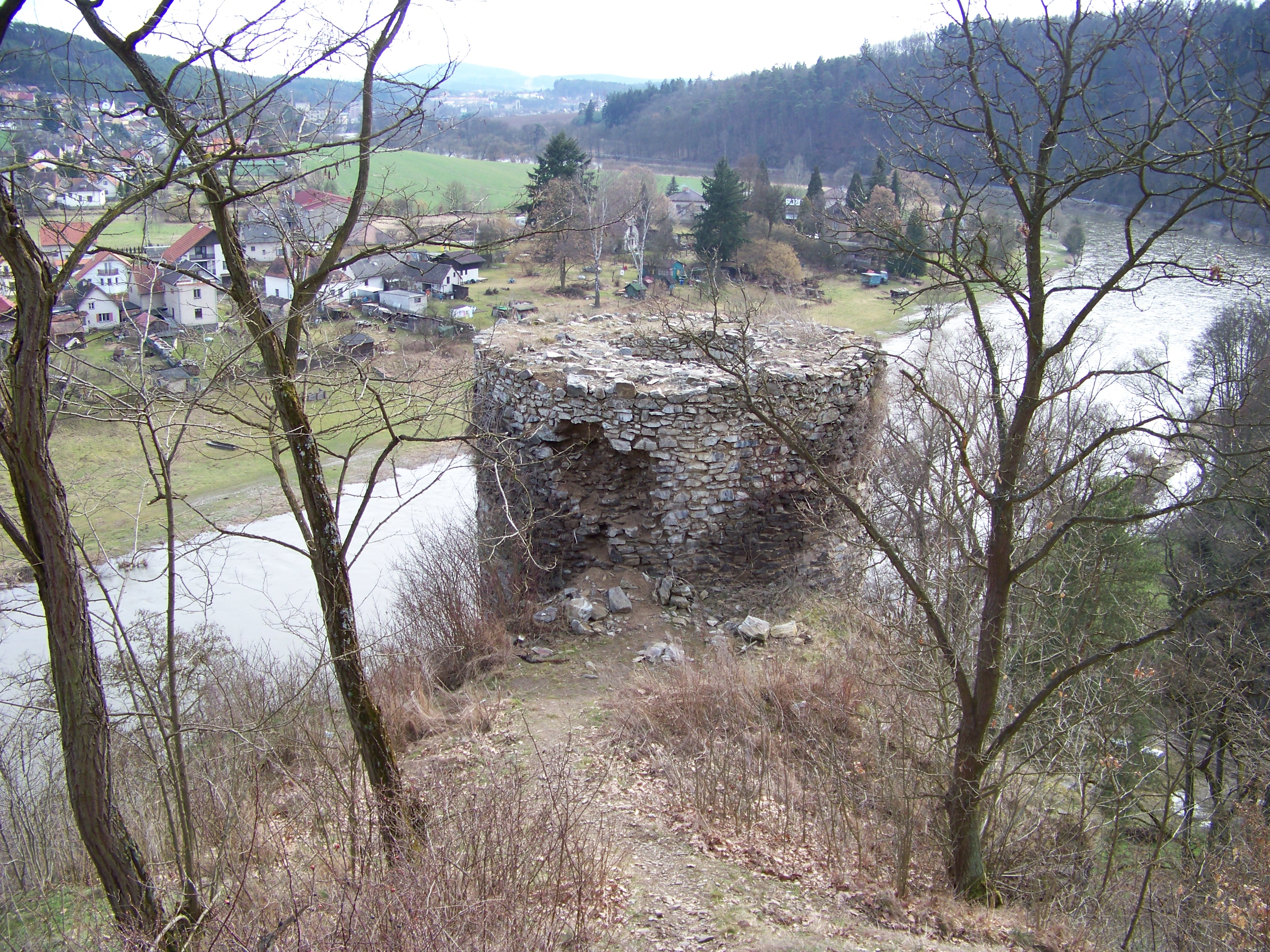
Zbořený Kostelec

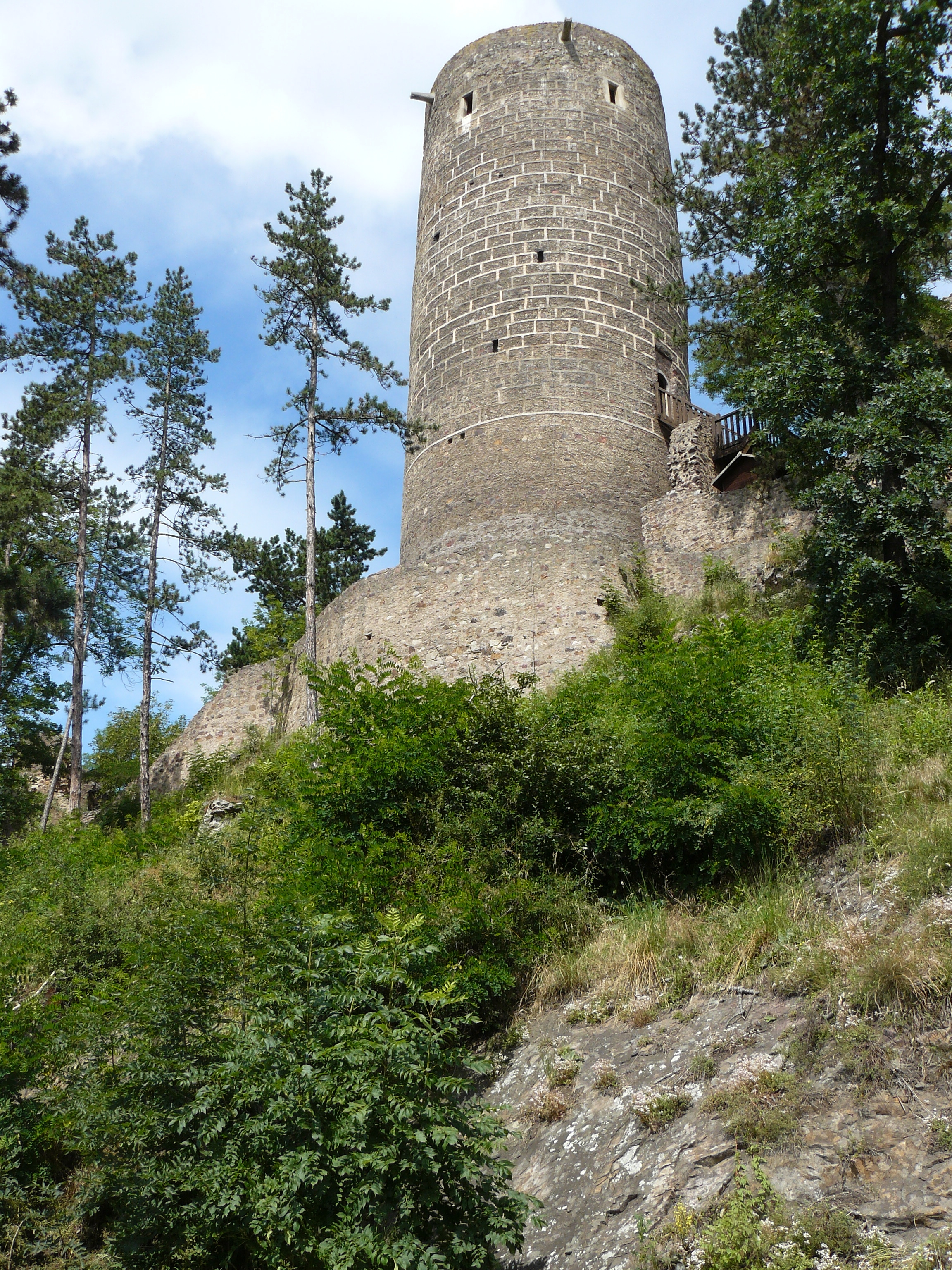
Žebrák

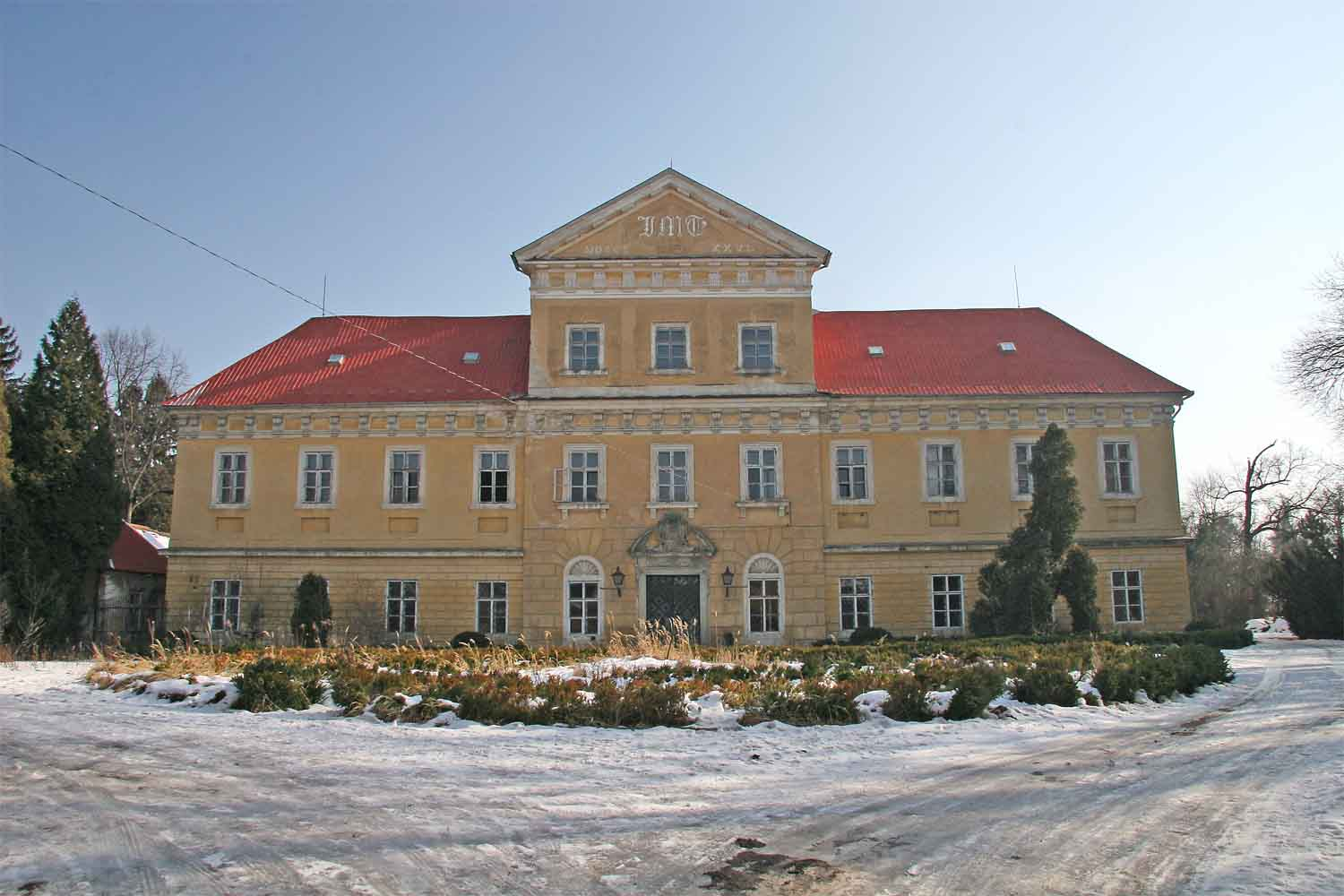
Žehušice

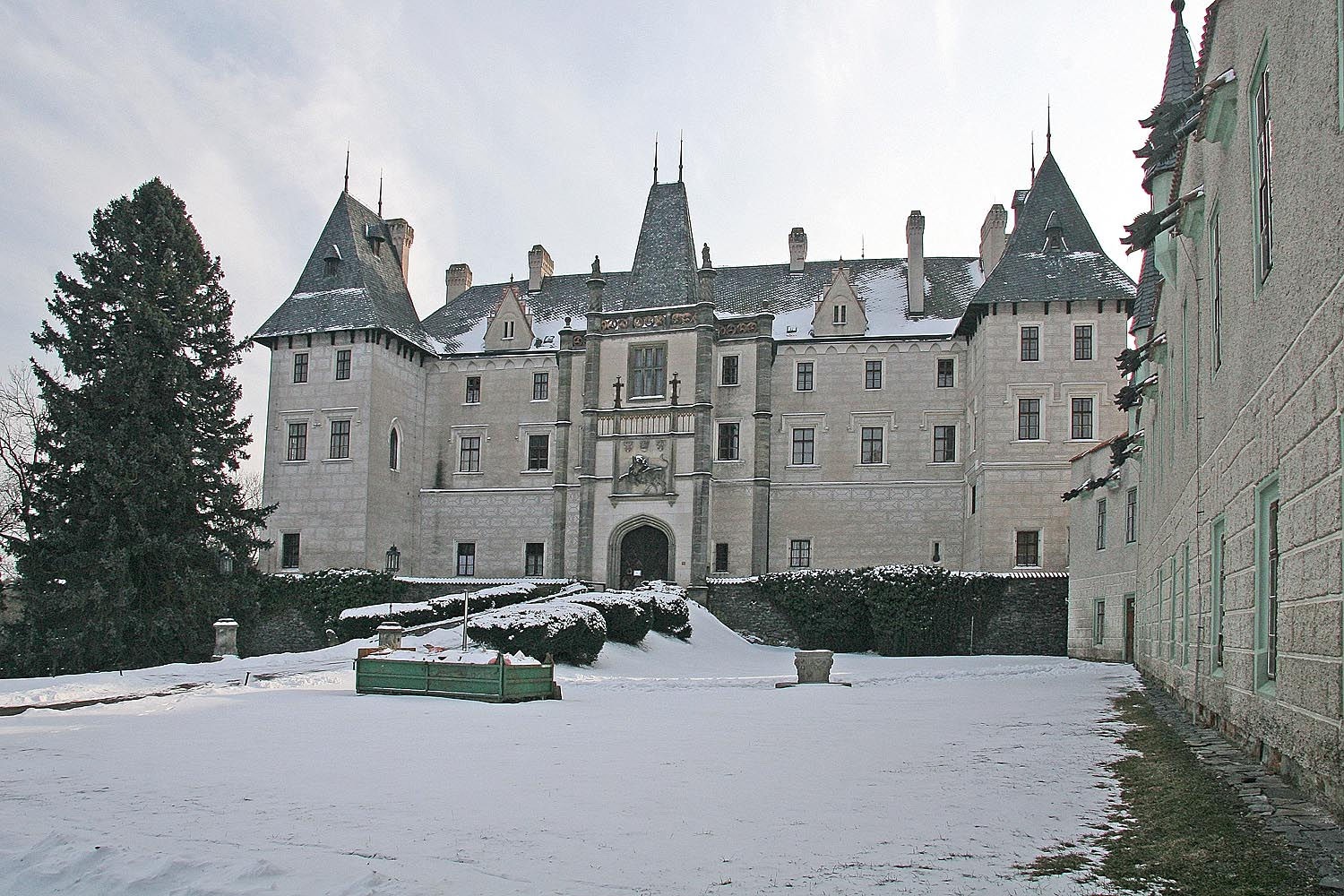
Žleby

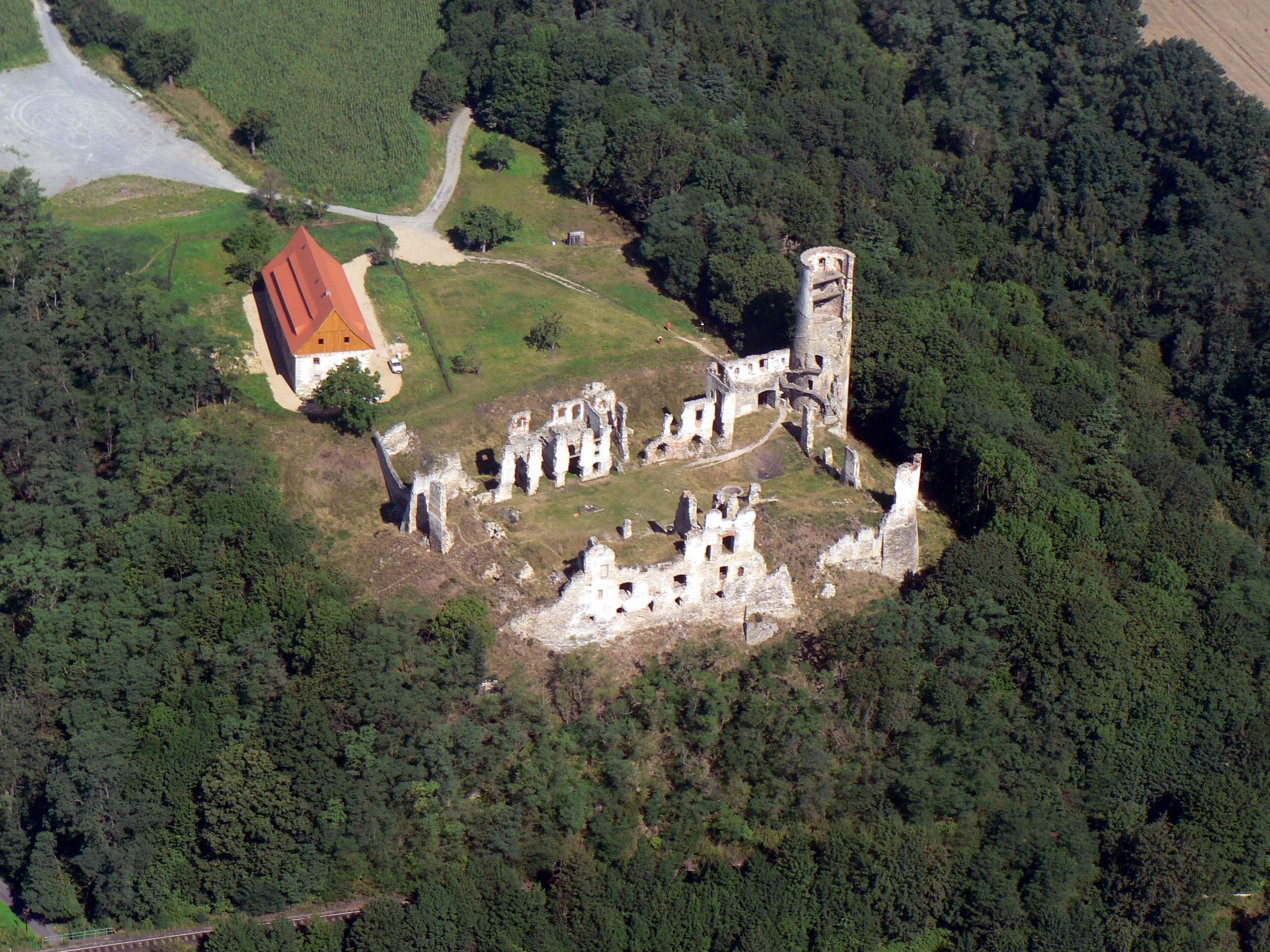
Zvířetice

== B ==
- Benátky nad Jizerou Chateau
- Bečváry Chateau
- Bezno Chateau
- Bělá pod Bezdězem Chateau
- Blahotice Chateau
- Bolechovice Chateau
- Bon Repos Chateau
- Brandýs nad Labem Chateau
- Brnky u Prahy Chateau
- Březnice Chateau
- Březno Chateau
- Budenice Chateau
- Buštěhrad Chateau

== C ==
- Cerhenice Chateau
- Chlukov Castle
- Chlum (u Čáslavi) Castle
- Chlum Castle
- Chlum Chateau, Mirošovice
- Chlumín Chateau
- Chotýšany Chateau
- Chvatěruby Castle
- Čechtice Chateau
- Čejchanov Castle
- Čelina Chateau
- Červené Janovice Chateau
- Červený Hrádek u Sedlčan Chateau
- Český Šternberk Castle
- Církvice Chateau
- Cítov Chateau

== D ==
- Diblíkov Chateau
- Dobrohošť Chateau
- Dobrovice Chateau
- Dobřejovice Chateau
- Dobřichovice Chateau
- Dobříš Castle
- Dobříš Chateau
- Dolní Beřkovice Chateau
- Dolní Břežany Chateau
- Domousnice Chateau
- Drahenice u Březnice Chateau
- Drábské světničky Castle
- Dražice (Benátky nad Jizerou) Castle
- Drštka Castle
- Dymokury Chateau
- Džbán Castle

== F ==
- Filipov Chateau

== H ==
- Harasov Castle
- Hlavačov Castle
- Hlavenec Chateau
- Hlízov Chateau
- Hluboš Chateau
- Hodkov Chateau
- Hodkovice Chateau
- Horky nad Jizerou Chateauou
- Horoměřice Chateau
- Hořelice Chateau
- Hořín Chateau
- Hořovice Chateau
- Hospozín Chateau
- Hostivice Chateau
- Hrad u Čtyřkol Castle
- Hrad u Úval Castle
- Hradištko Chateau
- Hradové Střimelice Castle
- Hrádek u Lovčic Castle
- Hrádek Castle in Kutná Hora
- Hrochův Hrádek Castle
- Hynšta Castle

== J ==
- Jablonná Chateau
- Jemniště Chateau
- Jenčov Castle
- Jenštejn Castle
- Jetřichovice Chateau
- Ježov Castle near Senohraby
- Jince Chateau
- Jirny Chateau
- Jivno Castle
- Josefův Důl Chateau

== K ==
- Kačina Chateau
- Kamenice Chateau
- Kamýk nad Vltavou Castle
- Karlík Castle
- Karlštejn Castle
- Kazín Castle
- Kácov Castle
- Kladno Chateau
- Klamorna Castle
- Klášter Hradiště nad Jizerou Chateau
- Klášterní Skalice Chateau
- Klecany Chateau
- Klemperka Castle
- Kluky Chateau
- Kňovice Chateau
- Kokořín Castle
- Koleč Chateau
- Kolešovice Chateau
- Kolín Castle
- Komorní Hrádek Chateau
- Konárovice Chateau
- Konopiště Chateau
- Kornhauz Chateau
- Kosmonosy Chateau
- Kosova Hora Chateau
- Kost Castle
- Kostelec nad Černými lesy Chateau
- Kostomlaty Castle
- Košátky Chateau
- Kounice Chateau
- Kovanice Chateau
- Kozí Hřbet Castle
- Kožlí Castle
- Krakovec Castle
- Králův Dvůr Chateau
- Krásná Hora Chateau
- Krnsko Chateau
- Krušovice Chateau
- Křinec Chateau
- Křivoklát Castle
- Křivsoudov Castle
- Kuncberk Castle
- Květnice Castle

== L ==
- Lány Chateau
- Leontýn Chateau
- Lešany Chateau
- Levý Hradec Castle
- Liběchov Chateau
- Liběhrad Castle
- Liblice Chateau
- Libouň Chateau
- Liteň Chateau
- Líšno Chateau
- Lobeč Chateau
- Lobkovice Chateau
- Loděnice Chateau
- Lojovice Chateau
- Loučeň Chateau
- Loukovec Chateau
- Louňovice pod Blaníkem Chateau
- Luštěnice Chateau
- Lužce Chateau
- Lysá nad Labem Chateau

== M ==
- Malkov Castle
- Martiněves Chateau
- Mcely Chateau
- Mělník Chateau
- Měšice u Prahy Chateau
- Měšice Chateau
- Michalovice Castle
- Miličín Castle
- Mladá Boleslav Castle
- Mnichovo Hradiště Chateau
- Mníšek pod Brdy Chateau
- Modletice Chateau
- Molitorov Chateau
- Mrač Chateau

== N ==
- Načeradec Chateau
- Nalžovice Chateau
- Nebřenice Chateau
- Nedamy Castle
- Nedrahovice Chateau
- Nelahozeves Chateau
- Neuberk Chateau
- Neuberk Chateau
- Neustupov Chateau
- Niměřice Chateau
- Nižbor Chateau
- Nové Dvory Chateau
- Nový Ronov Chateau
- Nový Stránov Chateau
- Nymburk Castle

== O ==
- Obříství Chateau
- Odlochovice Chateau
- Odolena Voda Chateau
- Okoř Castle
- Oráčov Castle
- Osečany Chateau
- Ostromeč Castle
- Ostředek Chateau

== P ==
- Pakoměřice Chateau
- Panenské Břežany Chateau
- Pašinka Chateau
- Pirkštejn Castle
- Poděbrady Castle
- Pravonín Chateau
- Předboř Chateau
- Přemyšlení Chateau
- Přerov nad Labem Chateau
- Přistoupim Chateau
- Příbram Castle
- Průhonice Chateau
- Pyšely Chateau

== R ==
- Radim Chateau
- Radíč Chateau
- Radlík Chateau
- Radovesnice Chateau
- Rataje nad Sázavou Chateau
- Ratměřice Chateau
- Rácov Castle
- Roudnice nad Labem Castle
- Roztoky u Prahy Chateau
- Rožďalovice Chateau
- Rožmitál Castle
- Rtíšovice Chateau
- Řepín Chateau
- Říčany Castle

== S ==
- Sazená Chateau
- Sion Castle
- Skalsko Chateau
- Slabce Chateau
- Smečno Chateau
- Smilkov Chateau
- Smolotely Chateau
- Sobín Castle
- Sovínky Chateau
- Stajice Castle
- Stará Dubá Castle
- Staré Hrady Castle
- Starý zámek Castle
- Statenice Chateau
- Stříbrná Skalice Castle
- Střížkov Chateau
- Studénka Chateau
- Suchdol Chateau
- Suchomasty Chateau
- Svatý Hubert Chateau
- Svinaře Chateau
- Šember Castle
- Škvorec Chateau
- Šprymberk Castle
- Štětkovice Chateau
- Štiřín Chateau

== T ==
- Talmberk Castle
- Tehov Castle
- Tetín Castle
- Tloskov Chateau
- Tochovice Chateau
- Točník Castle
- Třebešice Chateau
- Třebešice Castle
- Třebnice Chateau
- Třebonín Castle
- Třemšín Castle
- Tři trubky Chateau
- Tuchoměřice Chateau
- Tupadly - Slavín Chateau
- Týnec nad Sázavou Castle
- Týřov Castle

== U ==
- Uhy Chateau
- Unhošť Chateau
- Úholičky Chateau
- Úmonín Chateau

== V ==
- Valdek Castle
- Valečov Castle
- Včelní hrádek Chateau
- Velké Všelisy Chateau
- Veltrusy Chateau
- Vidim Chateau
- Vidlákova Lhota Chateau
- Vidovice Chateau
- Vinařice Chateau
- Vlastějovice Chateau
- Vlašim Chateau
- Vlašský dvůr Castle
- Vlčí Pole Chateau
- Vlčkovice Chateau
- Vlkava Chateau
- Vlkov nad Lesy Chateau
- Vojkov Chateau
- Vraný Chateau
- Vrchotovy Janovice Chateau
- Všenory Chateau
- Vysoký Chlumec Castle
- Vysoký Újezd Chateau

== Z ==
- Zásadka Castle
- Zásmuky Chateau
- Zbenice Chateau
- Zbořený Kostelec Castle
- Zbraslav Chateau
- Zbraslavice Chateau
- Zdonín Chateau
- Zduchovice Chateau
- Zlenice Castle
- Zlonice Chateau
- Zruč nad Sázavou Chateau
- Zvěřinec Castle
- Zvěstov Chateau
- Zvířetice Castle
- Zvoleněves Chateau
- Žáky Chateau
- Žebrák Castle
- Žehušice Chateau
- Žleby Chateau

== See also ==
- List of castles in the Czech Republic
- List of castles in Europe
- List of castles
