= Bezděkov =

Bezděkov may refer to places in the Czech Republic:

- Bezděkov (Havlíčkův Brod District), a municipality and village in the Vysočina Region
- Bezděkov (Klatovy District), a municipality and village in the Plzeň Region
- Bezděkov (Pardubice District), a municipality and village in the Pardubice Region
- Bezděkov (Rokycany District), a municipality and village in the Plzeň Region
- Bezděkov, a village and part of Bor (Tachov District) in the Plzeň Region
- Bezděkov, a village and part of Bouzov in the Olomouc Region
- Bezděkov, a village and part of Hradiště (Plzeň-South District) in the Plzeň Region
- Bezděkov, a village and part of Krásná Hora in the Vysočina Region
- Bezděkov, a village and part of Loket (Benešov District) in the Central Bohemian Region
- Bezděkov, a village and part of Lukavec (Pelhřimov District) in the Vysočina Region
- Bezděkov, a village and part of Nadějkov in the South Bohemian Region
- Bezděkov, a village and part of Pavlov (Jihlava District) in the Vysočina Region
- Bezděkov, a village and part of Švihov (Klatovy District) in the Plzeň Region
- Bezděkov, a village and part of Toužim in the Karlovy Vary Region
- Bezděkov, a village and part of Třemešné in the Plzeň Region
- Bezděkov, a village and part of Velká Bíteš in the Vysočina Region
- Bezděkov, a village and part of Vranov (Benešov District) in the Central Bohemian Region
- Bezděkov, a village and part of Žatec in the Ústí nad Labem Region
- Bezděkov nad Metují, a municipality and village in the Hradec Králové Region
- Bezděkov pod Třemšínem, a municipality and village in the Central Bohemian Region
- Bezděkov u Úsova, a village and part of Úsov in the Olomouc Region
- Dolní Bezděkov, a municipality and village in the Pardubice Region
- Horní Bezděkov, a municipality and village in the Central Bohemian Region
