= Bedřich Homola =

Czechoslovak general, legionnaire, and anti-Nazi resistance organizer (1887–1943)

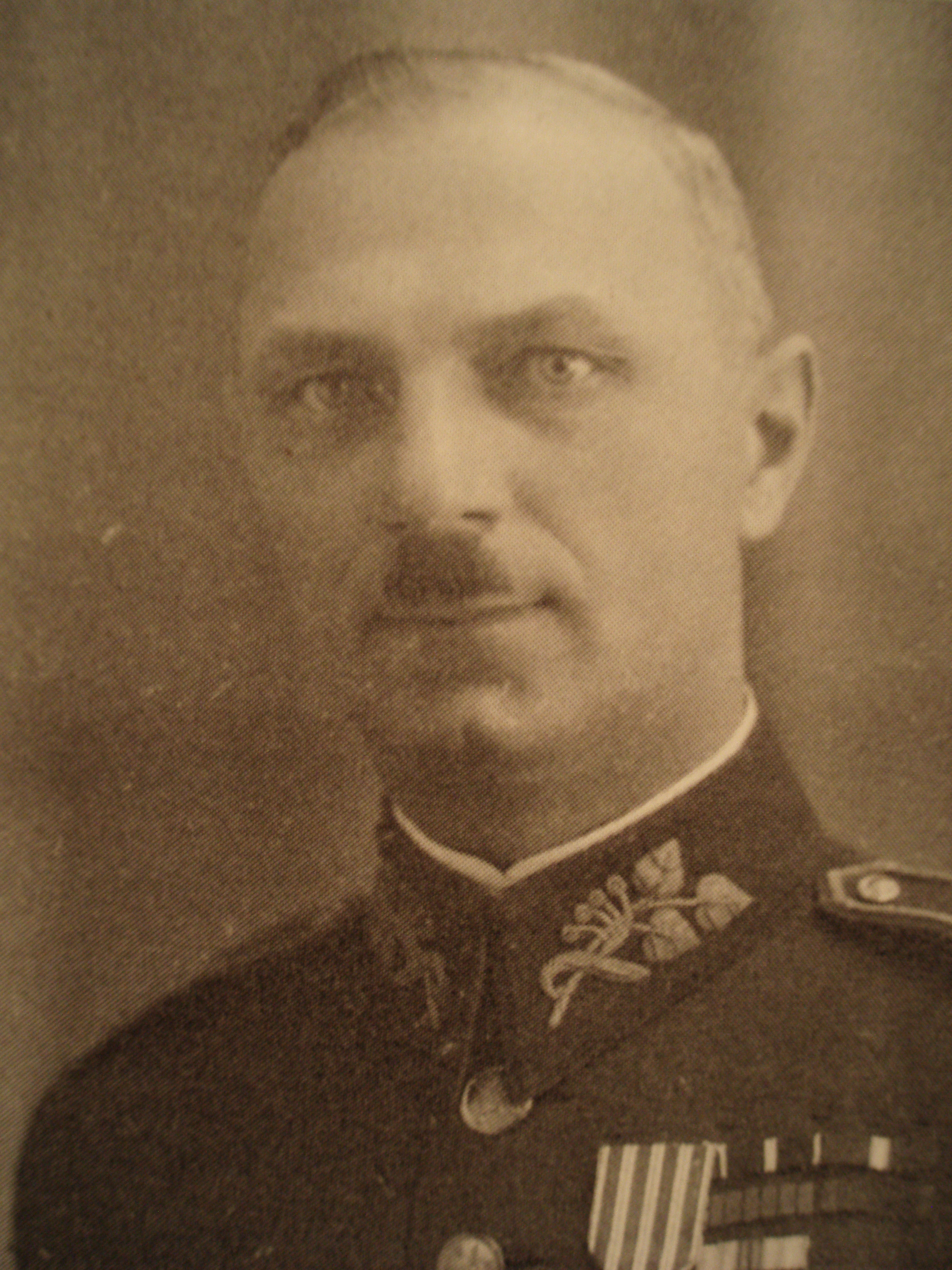
Bedřich Homola

Army General Bedřich Homola (2 June 1887, Běleč – 5 January 1943, Berlin, Plötzensee Prison) was a Czechoslovak soldier, general, legionnaire who fought for the Allies during the First World War, and the Head Commander of the anti-Nazi resistance organization Obrana národa ("Defense of the Nation") during the Nazi occupation of Bohemia and Moravia. He used the code name Ataman.

== Youth ==
He was born on 2 June 1887, in Běleč, today a part of Liteň, to Václav and Marie Homola, who were peasants. After completing elementary school in Lithuania in 1899 he attended secondary school in Hostomice, transferring in 1901 to a German-language school in Bílina. From 1903 to 1907 he attended the College of Civil Engineering in Prague.

In 1907–08 he was employed by the Prague architect Zuslicht. In 1908–09 he did volunteer work in Prague; in 1909–10 he worked for a construction company in Serbia and from 1910 to 1914 he had a job at the Prague City Hall.

== Military career ==
=== World War I ===
==== Austrian Army ====
Homola joined the Austrian Army as part of the mobilization of 27 July 1914. As a member of the 88th Infantry Regiment, he went to the Russian Front, where he was injured in September and returned home. A year later, now holding the rank of Lieutenant, he returned to the front at Debrecen and Galicia. On September 14, 1915, he was wounded again and captured by the Russians, who took him to Moscow.

==== Czechoslovak legions in Russia ====
Homola joined the Czechoslovak legions in Russia on 15 February 1916. He served as a company commander, then as the enlisted school commander. He went on to become commander of the section Čenokovka – Doč at Bachmače and then commander of the Northern Front. Beginning on 25 May he commanded a staff train and participated in the fighting at Marjanovky. On 27 October 1918, having been promoted to the rank of Major, he was appointed deputy commander of the officer school. On 20 July 2019, he became inspector of divisional courses for non-commissioned officers.

On 29 September 1919, he married Galina Faddějev, with whom he had a son, Oleg Homola (1921–2001), who would grow up to become an anti-Nazi political prisoner held in the Sachsenhausen concentration camp, where he was influenced by leftist intellectuals and became a Communist Party politician. He did not vote for the presence of the Warsaw Pact armies in Czechoslovakia in 1968, for which he was expelled from the party, and later became a literary scholar who used his position to employ dissidents. On 22 April 1920, he set off on a trip to Vladivostok, returning to his homeland via Singapore, Suez, and Trieste.

=== First and Second Republics ===
In 1921–22 he attended the war school in Prague. He was promoted to the rank of lieutenant colonel on 20 September 1922, and was appointed deputy commander of the military academy in Hranice na Moravě. After the suicides of two academy students, one of them the son of the Artillery Commander of the 1st Division of the Czechoslovak Legions in Russia, drew media attention to the strict regime Homola had established at the academy, he was transferred to the Staff 7th Infantry Division in Olomouc, where he served as commander. On 10 January 1925, he was promoted to Colonel and beginning on 1 October 1925, he was commander of the 27th Regiment in Olomouc.

On 1 January 1927, he was appointed interim commander, and on 31 March commander, of the 14th Infantry Brigade in Kroměříž. On 21 February 1929, he was promoted to the rank of Brigadier General. On 5 March he became commander of the 1st Infantry Division and garrison commander of Prague. On 1 July 1935, he became commander of the VII Army Corps with the rank of Divisional General. He participated in both of the mobilizations in 1938, in May and September. From 9 to 11 March 1939, at the behest of the government, he disarmed the Hlinka Guards and had their leaders interned. This event was later known in Slovakia as “Homola's coup.”

On 14 March 1939, he was called back to Prague without being told any reason. Unable to cross the newly established national border by car, he continued on by foot through the Beskydy Mountains while his wife was being interned by Hlinka Guardsmen in Turzovka. He managed to reach Moravia, where he met the advancing Wehrmacht. On 19 March 1939, a Slovak newspaper incorrectly reported that he had been shot and killed at the border. At the end of March 1939, he appeared in Prague with his wife (who had been released from captivity) and the two of them settled in Prague-Dejvice. He then began to work intensively with other officers of the now-defunct Czechoslovak Army to build a military resistance organization. Once the Defense of the Nation was formed, the Great Command of Prague was placed in his hands.

In August he went into hiding near Radnice in Skřež. In January 1940 he participated in the establishment of the HOME. In February 1940, after the arrest of generals Josef Bílý and Hugo Vojta, he became commander of the Defense of the Nation. From his office he tried to unite the military and political resistance against the occupiers under a single organization, namely Introduction. After the defeat of France by Germany (June 14, 1940), in addition to the hope for Britain's persistence, hopes for Russia began to decline. It was assumed that the Germans would unexpectedly attack Russia (which had a non-aggression pact with Germany from August 1938), which then happened. However, there was a concern about cooperation with Russia (Beneš warned against any dependence of the home on the "Soviets", because they will "always proceed in such a way that in the destruction of Germany, the communists will also win in our country").

Homola sent a courier message to London, in which he stated: "The only serious danger is from the Communists, who, although immediately weakened and agitated by the persecution, and against whom public opinion is due to the behavior of Moscow. The situation may change radically in time, especially if Moscow came into conflict with Berlin and succeeded in doing so. We must constantly reckon with this eventuality, all the more so since there were many voices – even wealthy citizens – who declared that they would rather be under the Moscow Communists and lose all their property than permanently under Berlin. For the reason they stated that Moscow will not take away our language or land, while Berlin will take both. The form of government will change, in 30–50 years there will be no communism, but there will be a nation, whereas under the rule of the Germans, the nation would be destroyed in 20 years. Certainly the reasons are very correct and factual and the people committed to this solution deserve nothing but praise. However, I believe that this will not happen, as things are going now, and the nation will be spared a second suffering. That was the reason why we tried to engage with Moscow, it was an eventuality just in case England weren't the victors, and by the autumn many believed so. Today, the situation has changed significantly, and so has our connection with the East."

In October 1940 he escaped arrest by the Gestapo and was forced to move to a new hiding place, where he continued to plan for an anti-German uprising by forces that would retake the parts of Czechoslovakia that had been invaded by the Nazis. Since his plans would require Allied air support and a decline in Nazi power, many of his colleagues opposed them. After the Nazis placed Reinhard Heydrich in charge of the Protectorate of Bohemia and Moravia on 27 September 1941, a state of emergency was declared and extensive arrests and executions took place. On 25 October 1941, Homola admitted to his Allied contacts in London that all of his work to establish a resistance had been undone.

=== Arrest and execution ===
He was arrested on 31 December 1941, at the corner of King George Square and Vinohradská Street in Prague. He was incarcerated in the Pankrác Prison, from which he was transported for questioning in Petschek Palace. In September 1942 he was taken to Dresden and from there to Plötzensee Prison in Berlin, where he was sentenced to death for high treason. During his last days in captivity he conducted himself with courage. He was executed on 5 January 1943.

In October 1946 he was promoted posthumously to General of the Army, effective October 1942.

== Orders and decorations ==
- Order of Saint Anne II. class with swords (1919)
- Czechoslovak War Cross 1914–1918
- The Order of M. R. Stefanik "Sokol" for valor (September 17, 1919)
- Czechoslovak Victory medal
- War Cross with Palm Tree (France, November 1928) during the fighting in Siberia
- Officer of the Legion of Honor (France, October 7, 1931)
- Štefánik's commemorative badge of the first degree (Czechoslovakia, September 27, 1945)
- Czechoslovak War Cross 1939
