= Jabloňany =

- Municipality
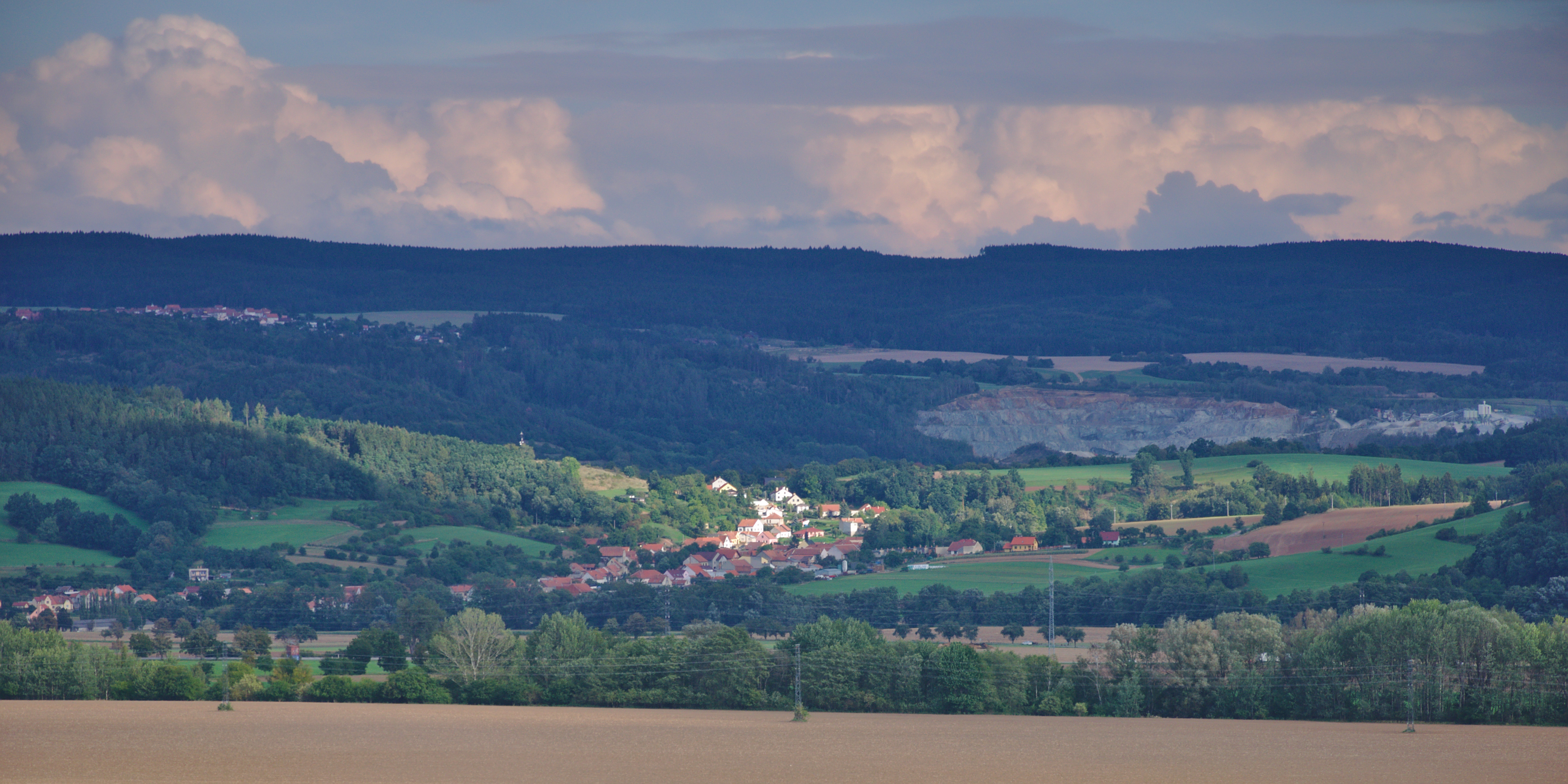
- View from the northwest

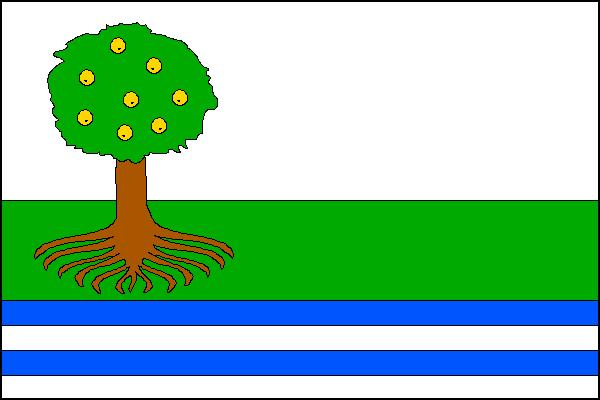
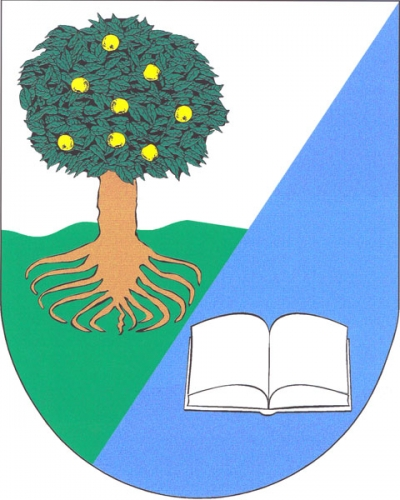
- Flag Coat of arms

- Location in the Czech Republic
- Coordinates: 49°27′55″N 16°36′26″E
- Country: Czech Republic
- Region: South Moravian
- District: Blansko
- First mentioned: 1357

Area
  - Total: 2.41 km^{2} (0.93 sq mi)
- Elevation: 337 m (1,106 ft)

Population (2026-01-01)
  - Total: 408
  - Density: 169/km^{2} (438/sq mi)
- Time zone: UTC+1 (CET)
  - Summer (DST): UTC+2 (CEST)
- Postal code: 679 01
- Website: www.jablonany.cz

Jabloňany is a municipality and village in Blansko District in the South Moravian Region of the Czech Republic. It has about 400 inhabitants.

== Etymology ==
The name is derived from the Czech word jabloň, i.e. 'apple tree'. It refers to the apple trees that in the past lined the road from Černá Hora to Svojanov Castle.

== Geography ==
Jabloňany is located about 11 kilometres (7 mi) north of Blansko and 27 km (17 mi) north of Brno. It lies in the Boskovice Furrow. The highest point is a nameless hill at 445 m (1,460 ft) above sea level. The Úmoří Stream flows through the municipality. The municipality is situated on the right bank of the Svitava River, which flows outside the municipal territory.

== History ==
The first written mention of Jabloňany is from 1357. During its feudal history, it belonged to the Černá Hora estate.

== Demographics ==
Historical population

Year	Pop.	±%
1869	313	—
1880	306	−2.2%
1890	322	+5.2%
1900	345	+7.1%
1910	342	−0.9%

Year	Pop.	±%
1921	370	+8.2%
1930	399	+7.8%
1950	372	−6.8%
1961	405	+8.9%
1970	383	−5.4%

Year	Pop.	±%
1980	410	+7.0%
1991	396	−3.4%
2001	382	−3.5%
2011	369	−3.4%
2021	386	+4.6%

Source: Censuses

== Transport ==
There are no railways or major roads passing through the municipality.

== Sights ==
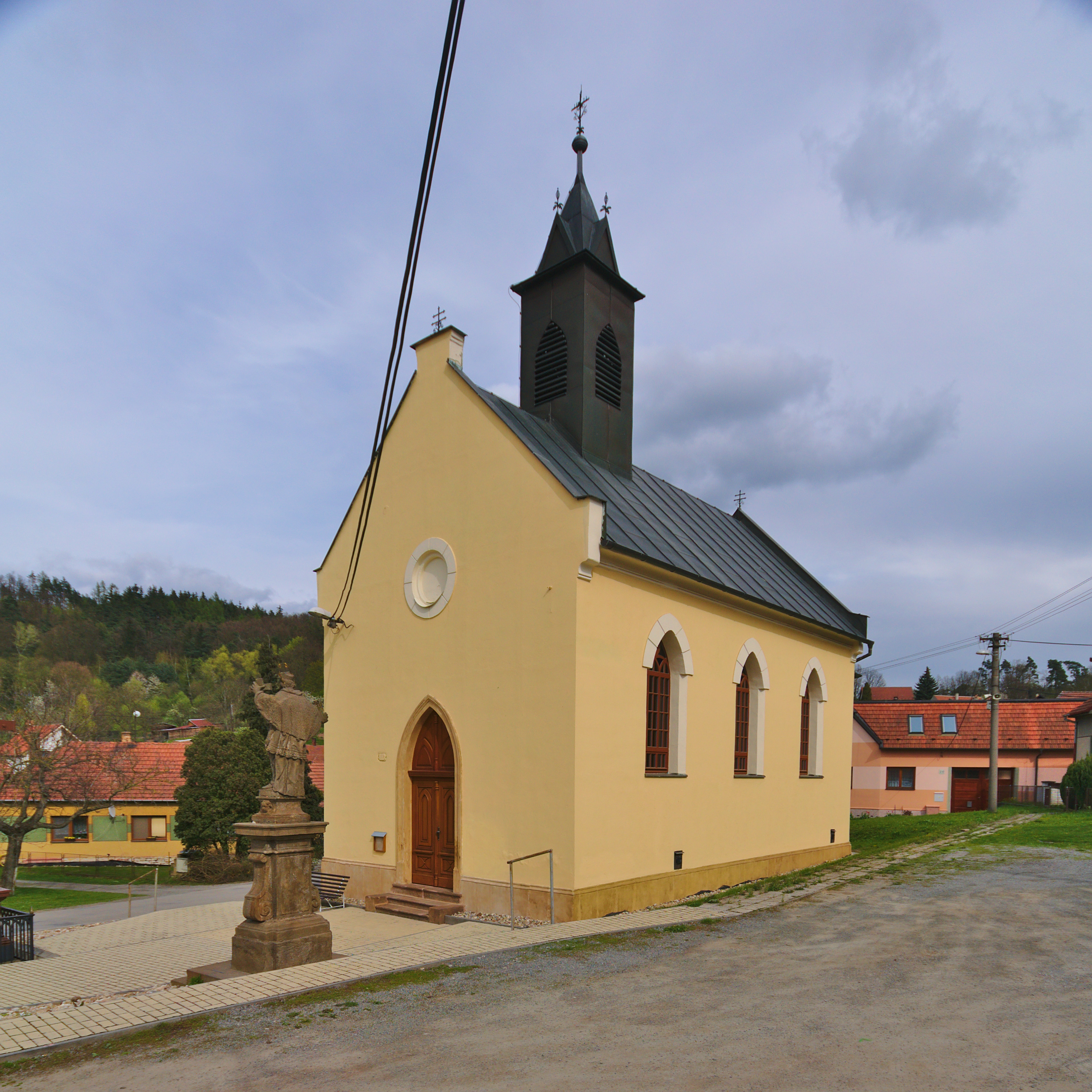
Chapel of Saints Cyril and Methodius

The only protected cultural monument in the municipality is a Baroque statue of Saint John of Nepomuk. It was created in 1750 and stands in front of the Chapel of Saints Cyril and Methodius in the centre of the village. The chapel dates from 1895.
