= Měšťanský pivovar v Poličce =

Brewery in Czech Republic

- Location: Polička, Czech Republic
- Coordinates: 49°42′38.52″N 16°15′36.36″E
- Opened: 1517; 508 years ago
- Owned by: Měšťanský pivovar v Poličce, a.s.
- Website: www.pivovar-policka.cz

Měšťanský pivovar v Poličce is a traditional town brewery in Polička, Czech Republic founded in 1517. As such, it is one of the oldest companies in the world. Beer has been brewed at the present location since 1865. Production reached almost 72,000 hectolitres of beer in 2008. In 2014 production had risen to over 108,000 hectolitres and the product was available at 28 pubs in Prague. In 2018, a book was published marking the 500th anniversary of the company. At that time, the brewery had become the third-largest independent brewery in the Czech Republic behind Budweiser Budvar Brewery and Pivovar Nymburk.

The products include:

- light beer 10° – Hradební
- dark beer 10° – Hradební
- light lager beer 11° – Otakar
- light lager beer 12° – Záviš

== See also ==
- List of oldest companies
