= Bezděkov (Rokycany District) =

- Municipality
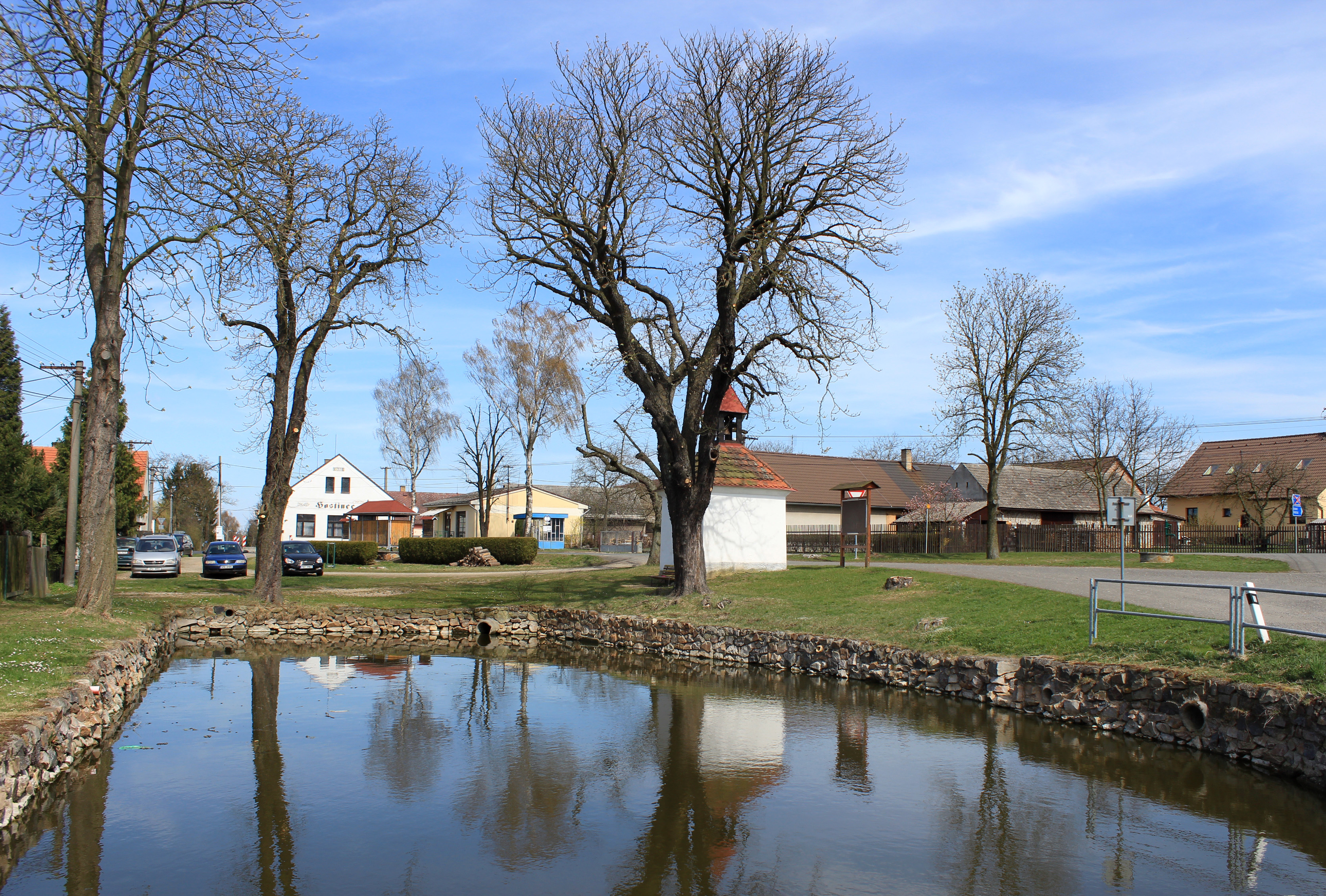
- Centre of Bezděkov

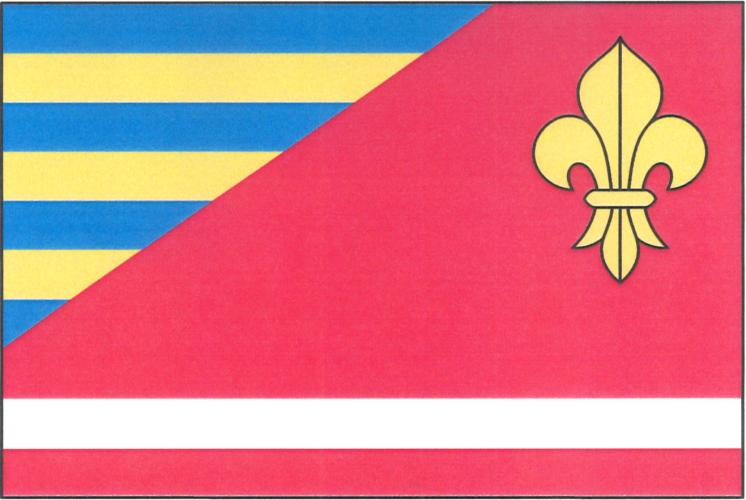
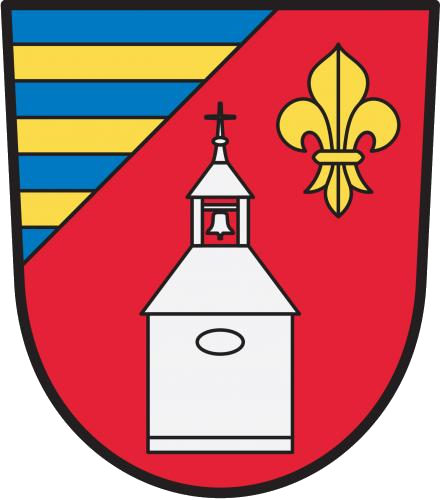
- Flag Coat of arms

- Location in the Czech Republic
- Coordinates: 49°49′28″N 13°35′48″E
- Country: Czech Republic
- Region: Plzeň
- District: Rokycany
- First mentioned: 1234

Area
  - Total: 1.22 km^{2} (0.47 sq mi)
- Elevation: 468 m (1,535 ft)

Population (2026-01-01)
  - Total: 162
  - Density: 133/km^{2} (344/sq mi)
- Time zone: UTC+1 (CET)
  - Summer (DST): UTC+2 (CEST)
- Postal code: 338 24
- Website: www.bezdekovradnicko.cz

Bezděkov (German: Besdiekau) a municipality and village in Rokycany District in the Plzeň Region of the Czech Republic. It has about 200 inhabitants.

== Etymology ==
The name is derived from the personal name Bezděk, meaning "Bezděk's (court)".

== Geography ==
Bezděkov is located about 9 kilometres (6 mi) north of Rokycany and 16 km (10 mi) northeast of Plzeň. It lies in the Plasy Uplands. The highest point is the hill Na Kalvárii at 499 m (1,637 ft) above sea level.

== History ==
The first written mention of Bezděkov is in a deed of King Wenceslaus I from 1234.

In 1961–1990, Bezděkov was a municipal part of Přívětice.

== Demographics ==
Historical population

Year	Pop.	±%
1869	272	—
1880	313	+15.1%
1890	305	−2.6%
1900	291	−4.6%
1910	275	−5.5%

Year	Pop.	±%
1921	240	−12.7%
1930	239	−0.4%
1950	164	−31.4%
1961	171	+4.3%
1970	146	−14.6%

Year	Pop.	±%
1980	109	−25.3%
1991	94	−13.8%
2001	92	−2.1%
2011	121	+31.5%
2021	144	+19.0%

Source: Censuses

== Transport ==
Bezděkov is located on the railway line Plzeň–Radnice.

== Sights ==
There are no protected cultural monuments in the municipality. In the centre of Bezděkov is a chapel.
