= Liteň =

- Market town
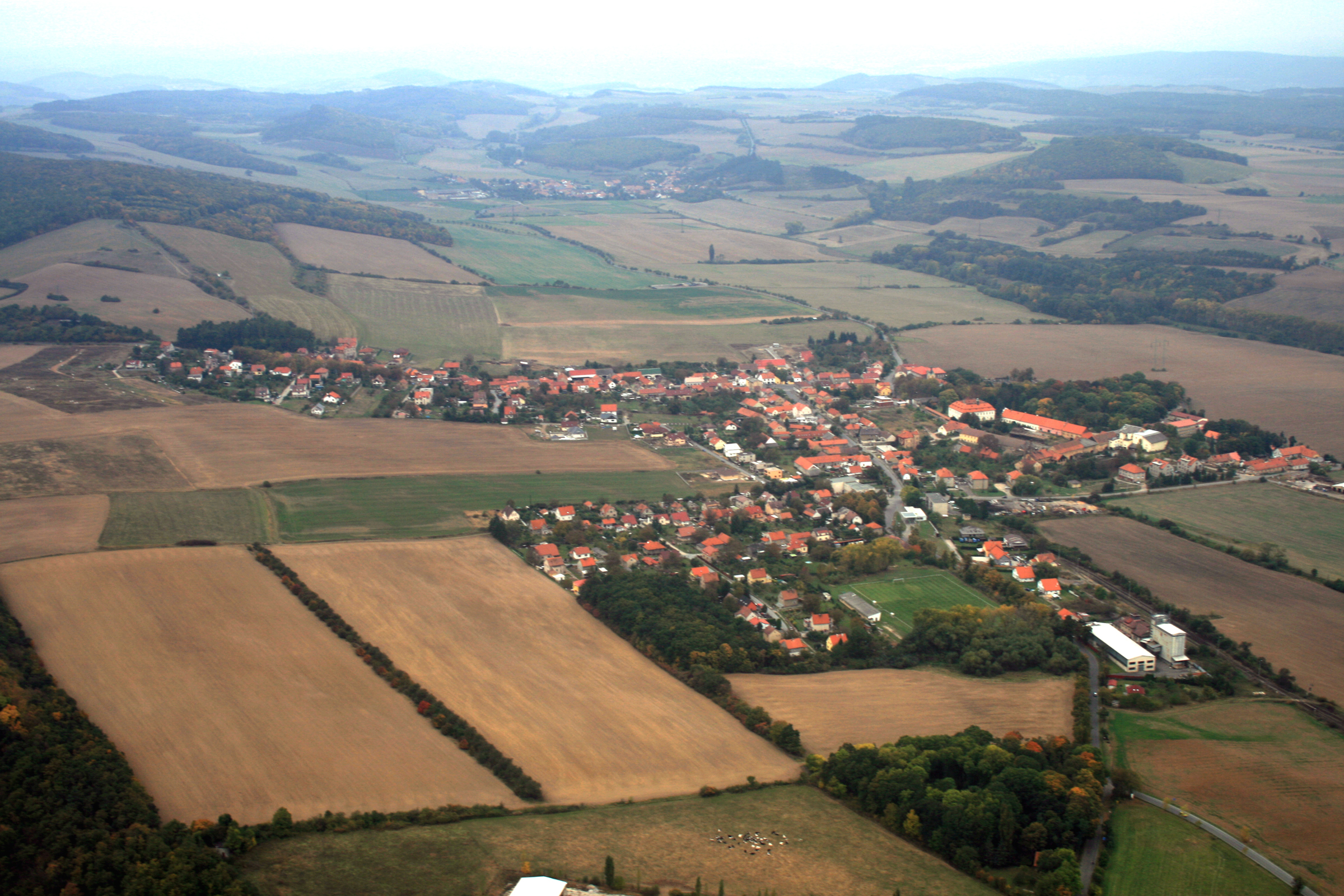
- Aerial view

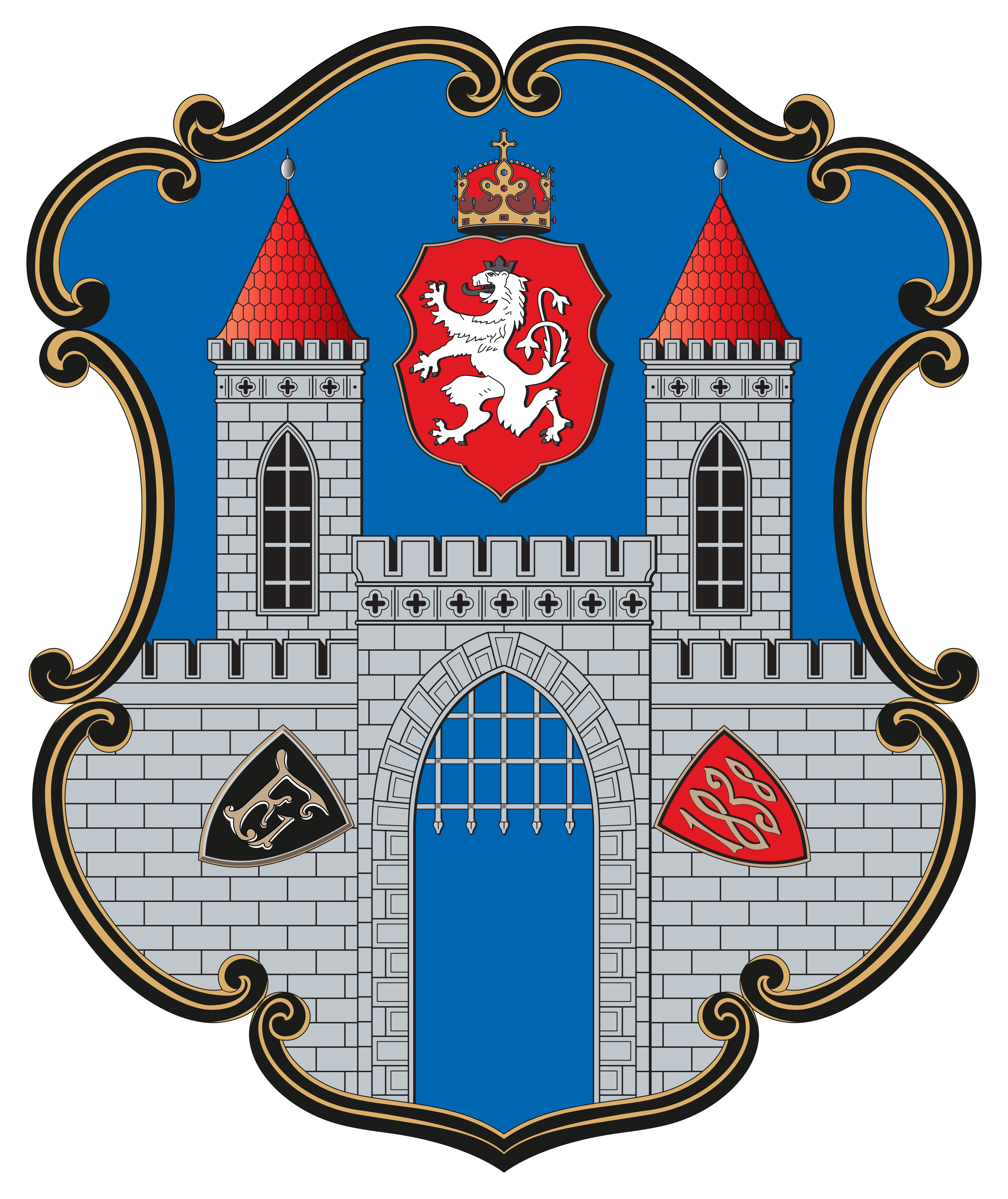
- Flag Coat of arms

- Location in the Czech Republic
- Coordinates: 49°55′56″N 14°10′31″E
- Country: Czech Republic
- Region: Central Bohemian
- District: Beroun
- First mentioned: 1195

Area
  - Total: 12.77 km^{2} (4.93 sq mi)
- Elevation: 322 m (1,056 ft)

Population (2026-01-01)
  - Total: 1,267
  - Density: 99.22/km^{2} (257.0/sq mi)
- Time zone: UTC+1 (CET)
  - Summer (DST): UTC+2 (CEST)
- Postal code: 267 27
- Website: www.mestysliten.cz

Liteň (Czech pronunciation: [ˈlɪtɛɲ]) is a market town in Beroun District in the Central Bohemian Region of the Czech Republic. It has about 1,300 inhabitants.

== Administrative division ==
Liteň consists of four municipal parts (in brackets population according to the 2021 census):

- Liteň (928)
- Běleč (183)
- Dolní Vlence (28)
- Leč (108)

== Etymology ==
The name is derived from the personal name Liten (in Old Czech written as Ľuten), meaning "Liten's (court)".

== Geography ==
Liteň is located about 9 kilometres (6 mi) southeast of Beroun and 21 km (13 mi) southwest of Prague. It lies in the Hořovice Uplands. The highest point is at 476 m (1,562 ft) above sea level. The stream Stříbrný potok flows through the northern part of the municipal territory, through Dolní Vlence and Běleč. Half of the Liteň's territory lies in the Bohemian Karst Protected Landscape Area.

== History ==
The first written mention of Liteň is from 1195. In the 16th century, it became property of the Wratislaw of Mitrovice family. Liteň was burned down by the Swedish army led by General Johan Banér in 1639, during the Thirty Years' War. In 1648, the Bubna of Litice family acquired Liteň. In the 18th century, Wratislaws of Mitrovice regained Liteň. The village was promoted to a market town in 1838 by Emperor Ferdinand I.

== Demographics ==
Historical population

Year	Pop.	±%
1869	1,297	—
1880	1,406	+8.4%
1890	1,392	−1.0%
1900	1,563	+12.3%
1910	1,417	−9.3%

Year	Pop.	±%
1921	1,282	−9.5%
1930	1,262	−1.6%
1950	1,248	−1.1%
1961	1,136	−9.0%
1970	1,009	−11.2%

Year	Pop.	±%
1980	1,019	+1.0%
1991	936	−8.1%
2001	952	+1.7%
2011	1,093	+14.8%
2021	1,247	+14.1%

Source: Censuses

== Transport ==
Liteň is located on the railway line of local importance from Lochovice to Zadní Třebaň.

== Culture ==
Festival of Jarmila Novotná is a music festival, which has been held every year in Liteň Castle since 2012.

== Sights ==
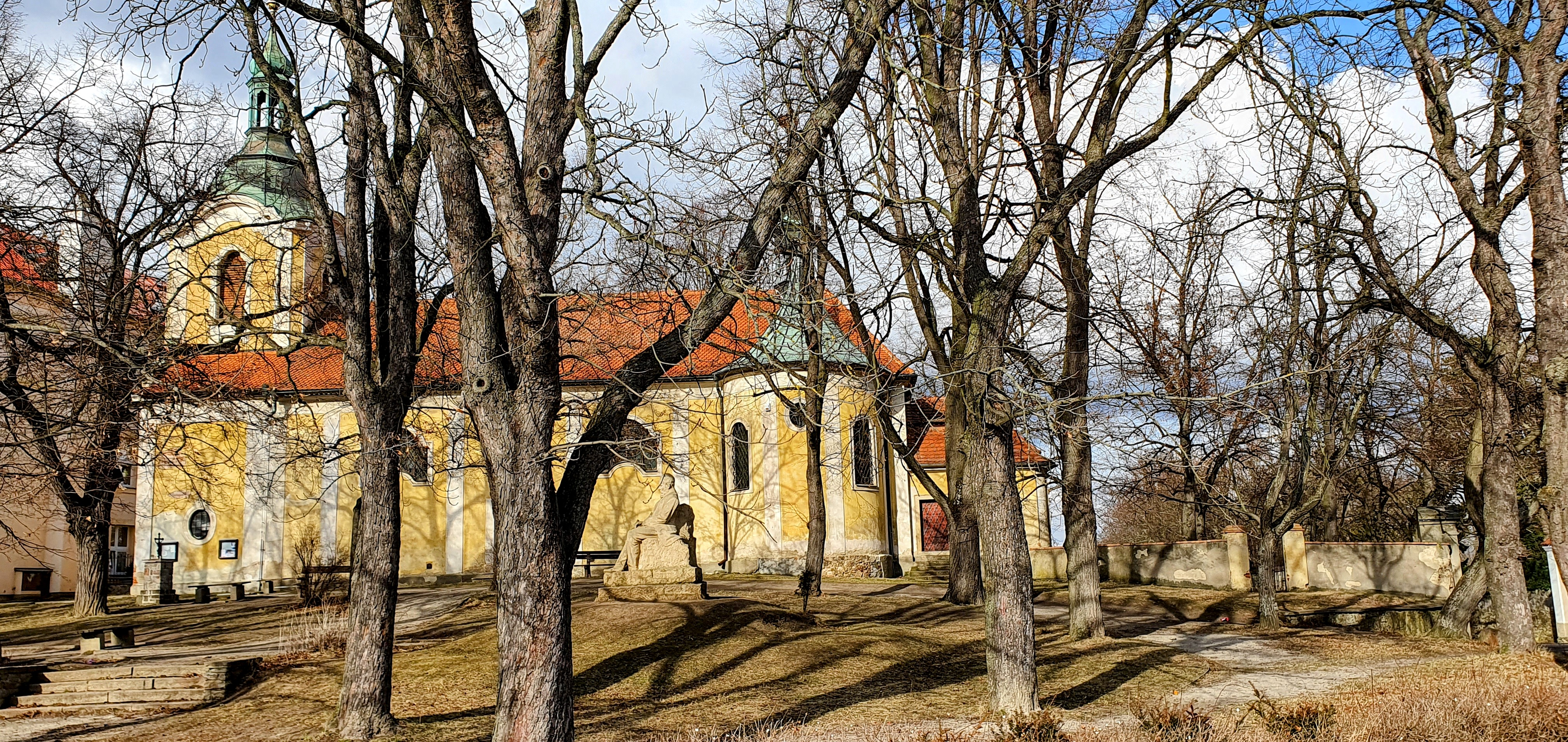
Church of Saints Peter and Paul

The Church of Saints Peter and Paul was originally a Gothic building from the 13th century, rebuilt in tha Baroque style in the 17th century.

The Liteň Castle was built on the site of a former Gothic fortress in 1661 and rebuilt in the 18th century. Today it is privately owned and used for social and cultural purposes and as a hotel. Next to the castle is a castle park.

== Notable people ==
- Josef Šebestián Daubek (1842–1922), Czech-Austrian politician and entrepreneur; died here
- Bedřich Homola (1887–1943), military leader
- Jarmila Novotná (1907–1994), soprano and actress; lived here
