= Svojanov =

- Market town
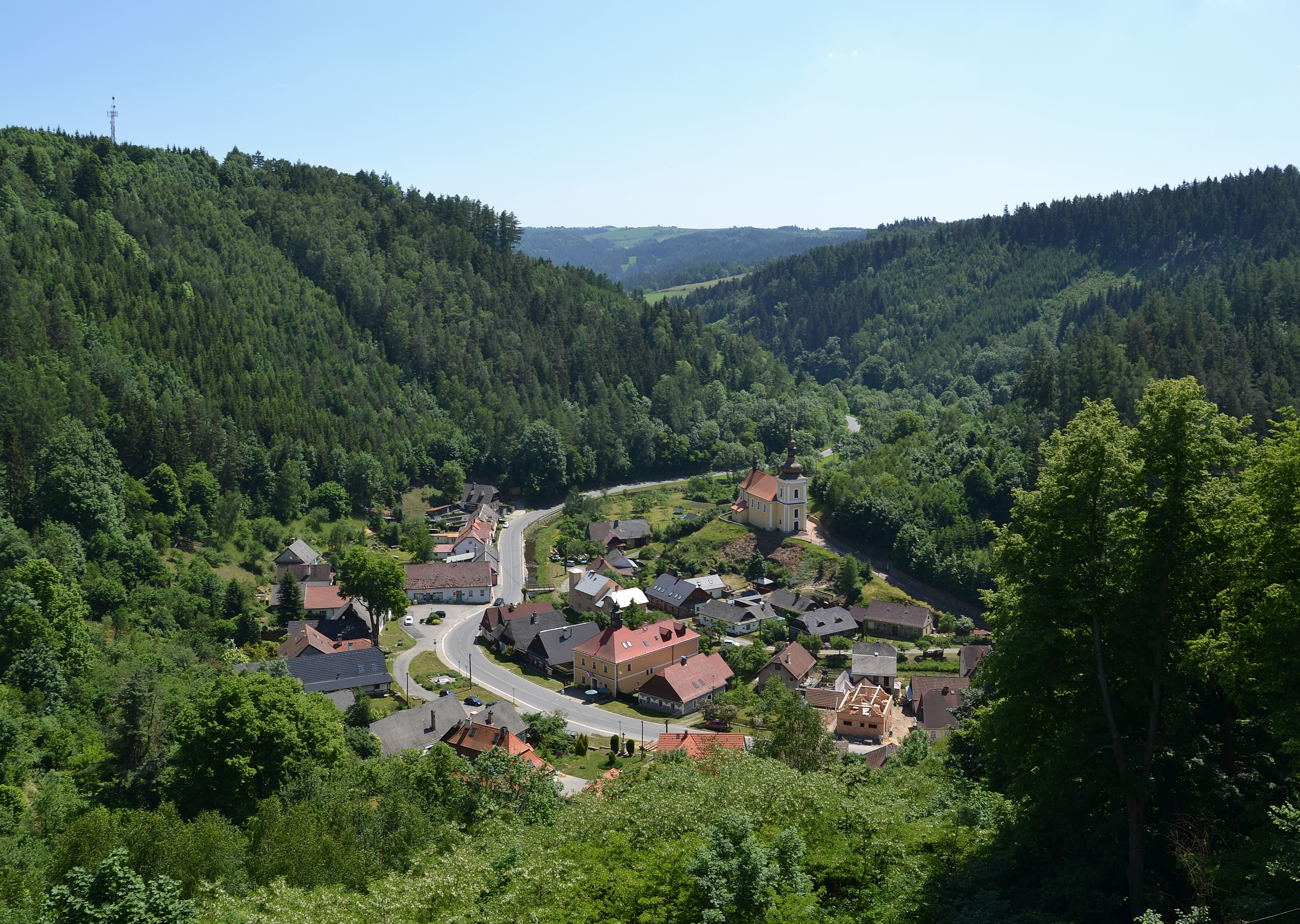
- Svojanov as seen from the Svojanov Castle

- Flag Coat of arms

- Location in the Czech Republic
- Coordinates: 49°37′29″N 16°24′37″E
- Country: Czech Republic
- Region: Pardubice
- District: Svitavy
- First mentioned: 1287

Area
  - Total: 13.89 km^{2} (5.36 sq mi)
- Elevation: 460 m (1,510 ft)

Population (2026-01-01)
  - Total: 352
  - Density: 25.3/km^{2} (65.6/sq mi)
- Time zone: UTC+1 (CET)
  - Summer (DST): UTC+2 (CEST)
- Postal codes: 569 73, 569 92
- Website: mestyssvojanov.cz

Svojanov (Czech pronunciation: [ˈsvojanof]) is a market town in Svitavy District in the Pardubice Region of the Czech Republic. It has about 400 inhabitants. It is known for the Svojanov Castle.

== Administrative division ==
Svojanov consists of six municipal parts (in brackets population according to the 2021 census):

- Svojanov (131)
- Dolní Lhota (21)
- Hutě (11)
- Předměstí (57)
- Starý Svojanov (123)
- Studenec (33)

== Geography ==
Svojanov is located about 15 kilometres (9 mi) south of Svitavy and 63 km (39 mi) southeast of Pardubice. It lies on the border between the Upper Svratka Highlands and Svitavy Uplands. The highest point is at 623 metres (2,044 ft) above sea level. The market town is situated in the valley of the Křetínka River.

== History ==
The Svojanov Castle (called Fürstenberg until 1320) was built in the 1260s. During the reign of King Ottokar II, it was used for protection of the trade route from Bohemia to Moravia. The first written mention of the settlement of Svojanov, located below the castle, is from 1287. It was then owned by Záviš of Falkenstein, who had the small fortress extended into a large Gothic castle. The village of Starý Svojanov ('old Svojanov') was founded in the 13th century and supposedly is the oldest part of today's municipality.

In 1421, Svojanov was besieged by Jan Žižka and between 1642 and 1645, the market town was occupied by the Swedish army. In December 1798, the Russian legions marched through Svojanov to fight against Napoleon.

== Demographics ==
Historical population

| Year | Pop. | ±% |
|---|---|---|
| 1869 | 1,626 | — |
| 1880 | 1,779 | +9.4% |
| 1890 | 1,958 | +10.1% |
| 1900 | 2,028 | +3.6% |
| 1910 | 2,079 | +2.5% |

| Year | Pop. | ±% |
|---|---|---|
| 1921 | 1,683 | −19.0% |
| 1930 | 1,657 | −1.5% |
| 1950 | 998 | −39.8% |
| 1961 | 1,011 | +1.3% |
| 1970 | 811 | −19.8% |

| Year | Pop. | ±% |
|---|---|---|
| 1980 | 611 | −24.7% |
| 1991 | 486 | −20.5% |
| 2001 | 412 | −15.2% |
| 2011 | 375 | −9.0% |
| 2021 | 376 | +0.3% |

Source: Censuses

== Transport ==
There are no railways or major roads passing through the municipal territory.

== Sights ==
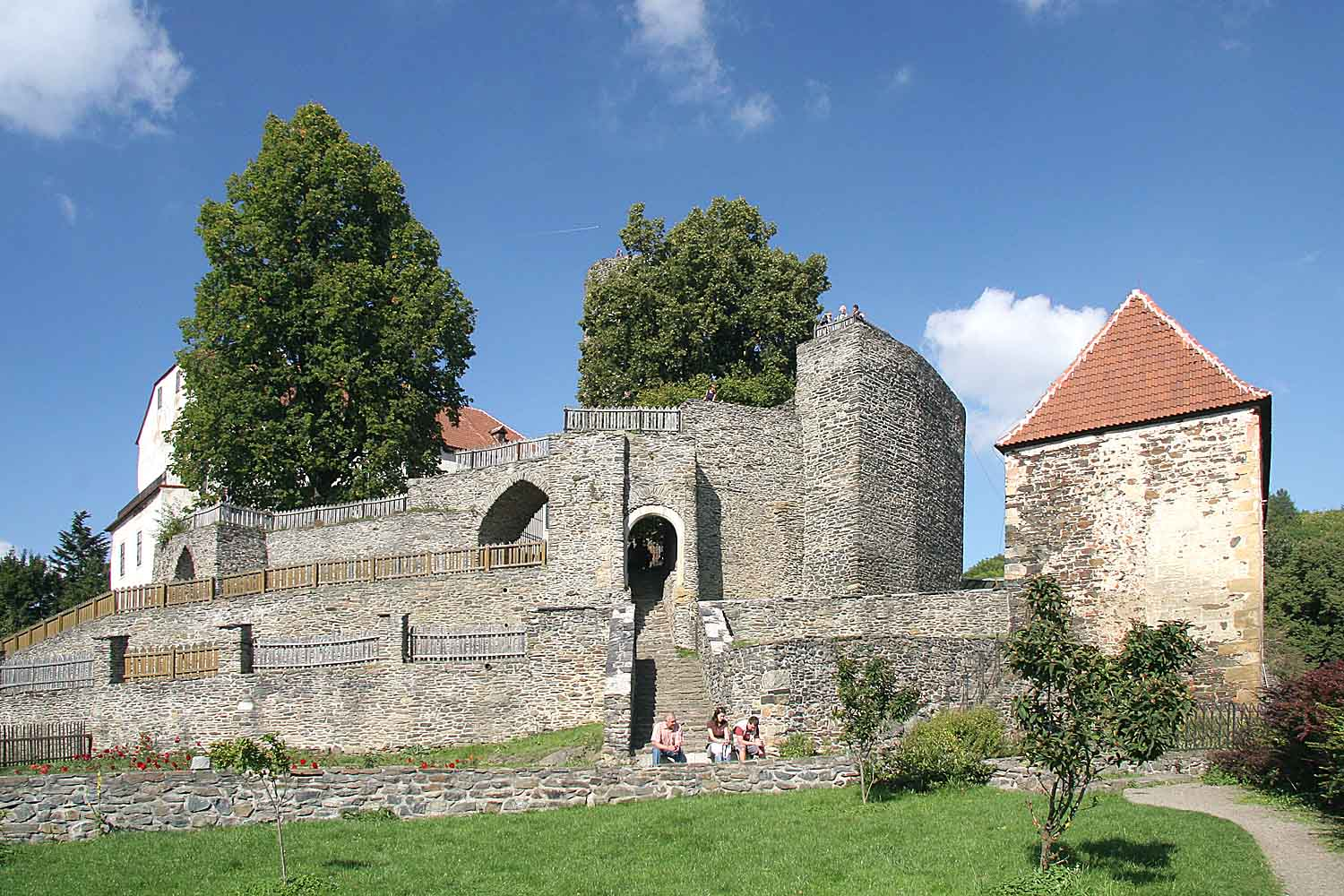
Svojanov Castle

Svojanov Castle, built in the early Gothic style, is one of the oldest stone castles in the country. In the 15th century, it was fortified. Since 1910, it has been owned by the town of Polička. The castle complex was expanded in the 16th century to include a Renaissance palace and other buildings. After the 1842 fire, the palace was rebuilt in the Empire style. The castle ruins and the Empire palace are open to the public and often are used for cultural purposes.

A notable cultural landmark is the Church of Saint Nicholas with a 13th-century chancel and fresco decoration, which dates back to the period of King Charles IV.
