= Svojanov Castle =

Coordinates: 49°37′38″N 16°24′30″E

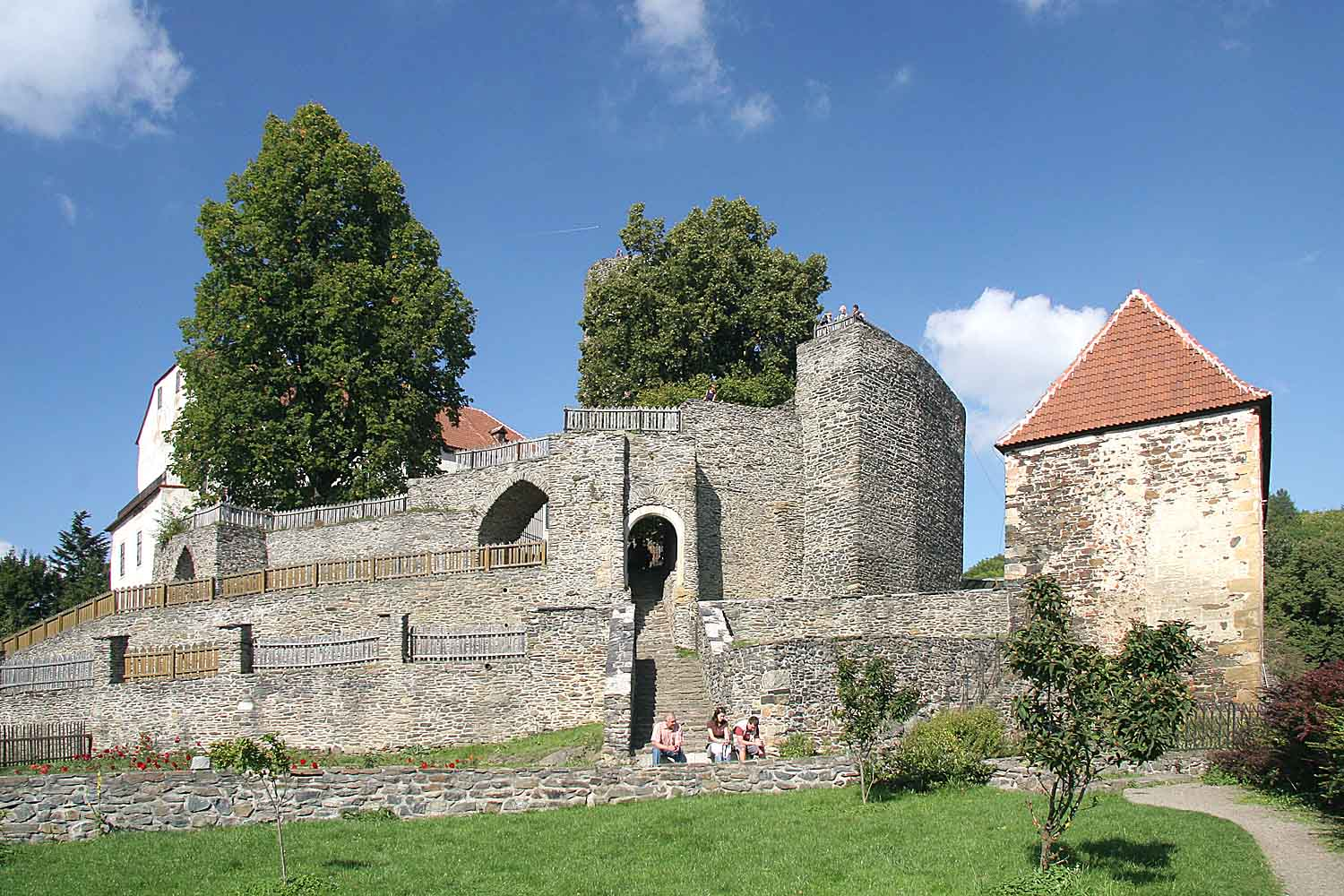
View from the garden

Svojanov Castle (Czech: hrad Svojanov) is a Gothic castle in Svojanov in the Pardubice Region of the Czech Republic. It is one of the oldest stone castles in the country, with origins dating back to the 13th century. Located in a wooded valley above the Křetínka River, Svojanov Castle is notable for its combination of Gothic, Renaissance and Empire architectural styles, reflecting the various phases of its long and complex history.

== History ==
According to some sources the castle was founded around 1224 by Royal Burgrave Svéslav of Bořitov, but it was probably founded around 1262 or 1265. The castle served as a royal fortress to protect a vital trade route known as the Trstěnice Trail, connecting Bohemia with Moravia. It originally served both defensive and administrative purposes. After King Ottokar II's death in 1278, the castle came into the possession of Queen Kunigunda and her second husband, Záviš of Falkenstein, who expanded the structure.

Until 1419, the castle remained a royal property. From 1419 to 1512, the castle was owned by Lords of Boskovice, then it was sold to the Trčka of Lípa family. During their rule, the castle underwent Renaissance renovations and was converted into a more comfortable residence. However, during the Thirty Years' War (1618–1648), it was plundered and partially destroyed. The castle gradually fell into decline over the following centuries, though it remained occupied and partially preserved.

In 1842, after a fire, the castle underwent reconstruction in the Empire style under the ownership of the Kriesten family. From 1910 to 1953 and since 1992, the castle has been owned by the town of Polička, which has undertaken preservation efforts.

Since 1964, the castle has been protected as a cultural monument.

== Architecture ==
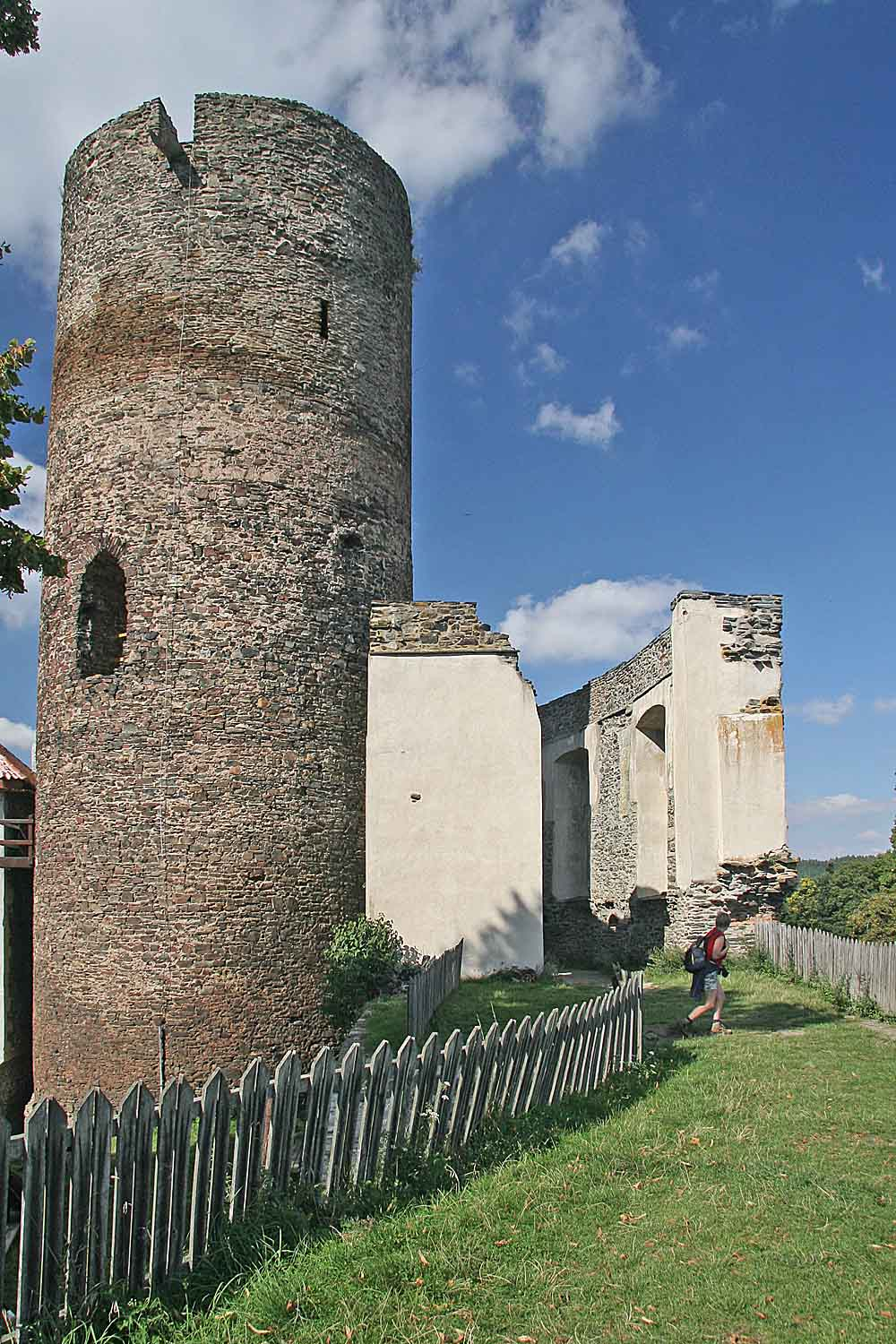
Defensive tower

Svojanov Castle uniquely combines architectural elements from multiple eras. The core of the structure retains its original Gothic character, particularly evident in the cylindrical tower, perimeter walls, and early fortifications. Renaissance additions include residential wings and arcades, while the 19th-century Empire style is reflected in interior design elements. The castle complex includes a palace, fortification walls, bastions, a chapel, and gardens. The tall round tower offers panoramic views of the surrounding countryside and is a popular attraction.

== Tourism and culture ==
Today, Svojanov Castle is open to the public and serves as a cultural and tourist site. It hosts guided tours, historical reenactments, medieval festivals, exhibitions, and theatrical performances. The castle also offers accommodation in historical settings.

Svojanov is often associated with ghost stories and legends, contributing to its reputation as one of the "most haunted" castles in the Czech Republic.

== See also ==
- List of castles in the Czech Republic
- Czech Gothic architecture
