= Josef Šebestián Daubek =

Czech-Austrian nobleman

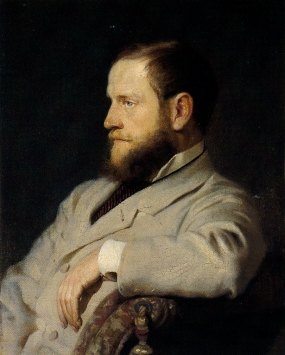
Josef Šebestián Daubek; portrait by František Ženíšek (1878)

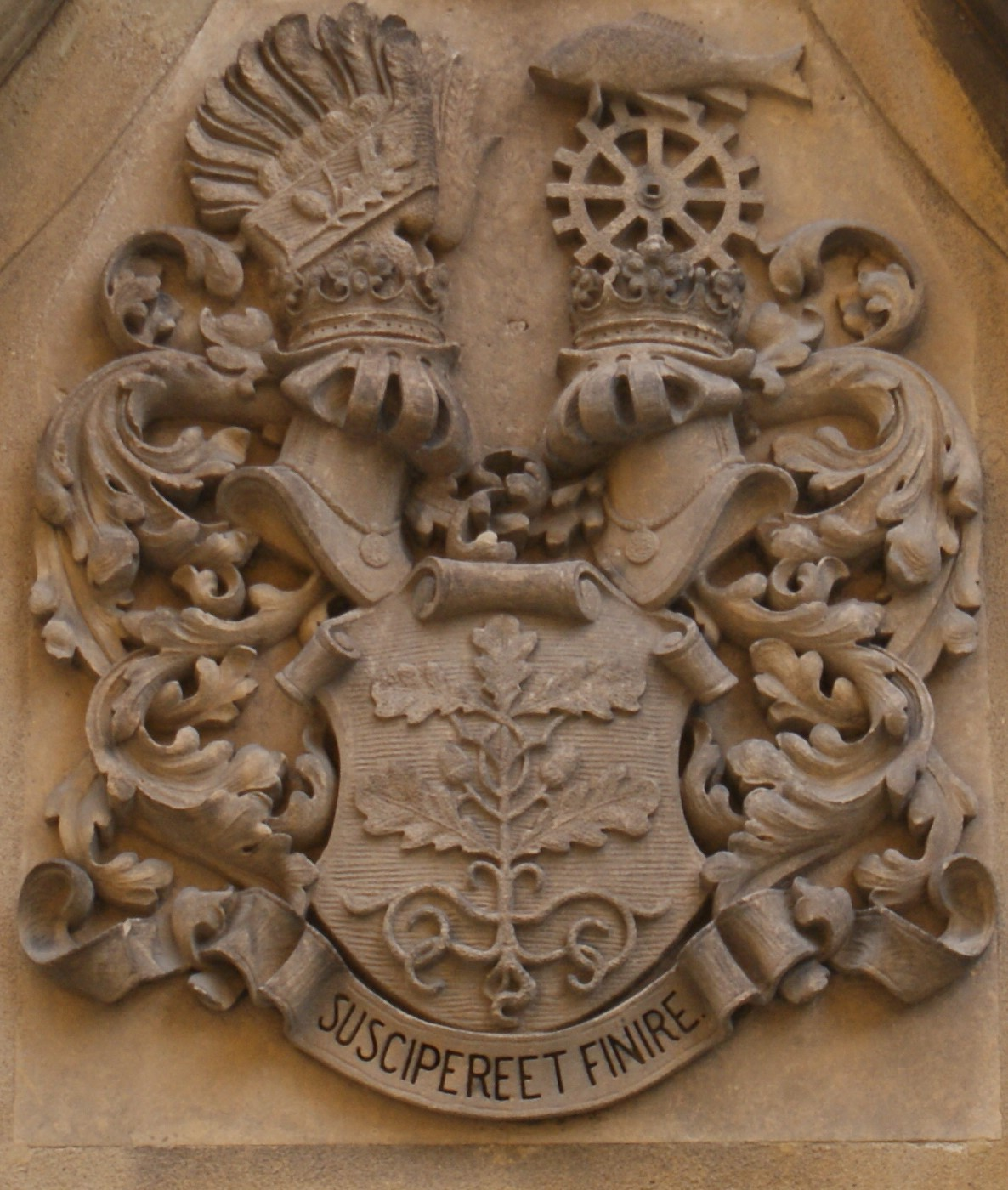
The Daubek Coat-of-Arms

Josef Šebestián Daubek (24 December 1842, Polička – 15 July 1922, Liteň) was a Czech-Austrian nobleman, politician, entrepreneur and patron of the arts.

== Biography ==
His father, Josef František Doubek, was a well-known businessman and politician. His mother was the daughter of the poet, Šebestián Hněvkovský. He attended a Realschule in Prague, followed by a business and commercial education in Vienna; where he married Irma Welsová in 1884.

In 1873 he became a shareholder in the family's mills in Brněnec; becoming the owner in 1878. Four years later, he acquired the family estates in Liteň and Dolní Vlence, in the Beroun District. This led to involvement in the distilling and brewing industry; interests which later passed to his son, Josef Daubek (1888–1934). Together with Karl Kruis (1851-1917), he established the first distillery training school in Předlitavsko. Shortly after, he was appointed a member of the Institute of Economics at the Czech Academy of Sciences and Arts. In 1892, he became Chairman of the Association of Commercial Mills and was knighted in 1896.

In addition to his business interests, he was active in politics; serving three terms as the District Mayor in Polička (1874, 1890, 1893). For many years he served on the Municipal Council in Brněnec and the District Committee for Beroun.

Following a by-election in 1892, he became a member of the Bohemian Diet. He was re-elected for a full term in 1895; standing for the Conservative Estate Party.

He was also a patron of the arts and formed a life-long friendship with the painter, František Ženíšek, whom he engaged to decorate his home in Liteň. Ženíšek later accompanied him on his honeymoon to Holland; painting the "official portrait" of the newlywed couple. Many other artists received significant support from him; including Josef Mánes, Quido Mánes, Josef Václav Myslbek and Antonín Wiehl.
