= Třemešné =

- Municipality
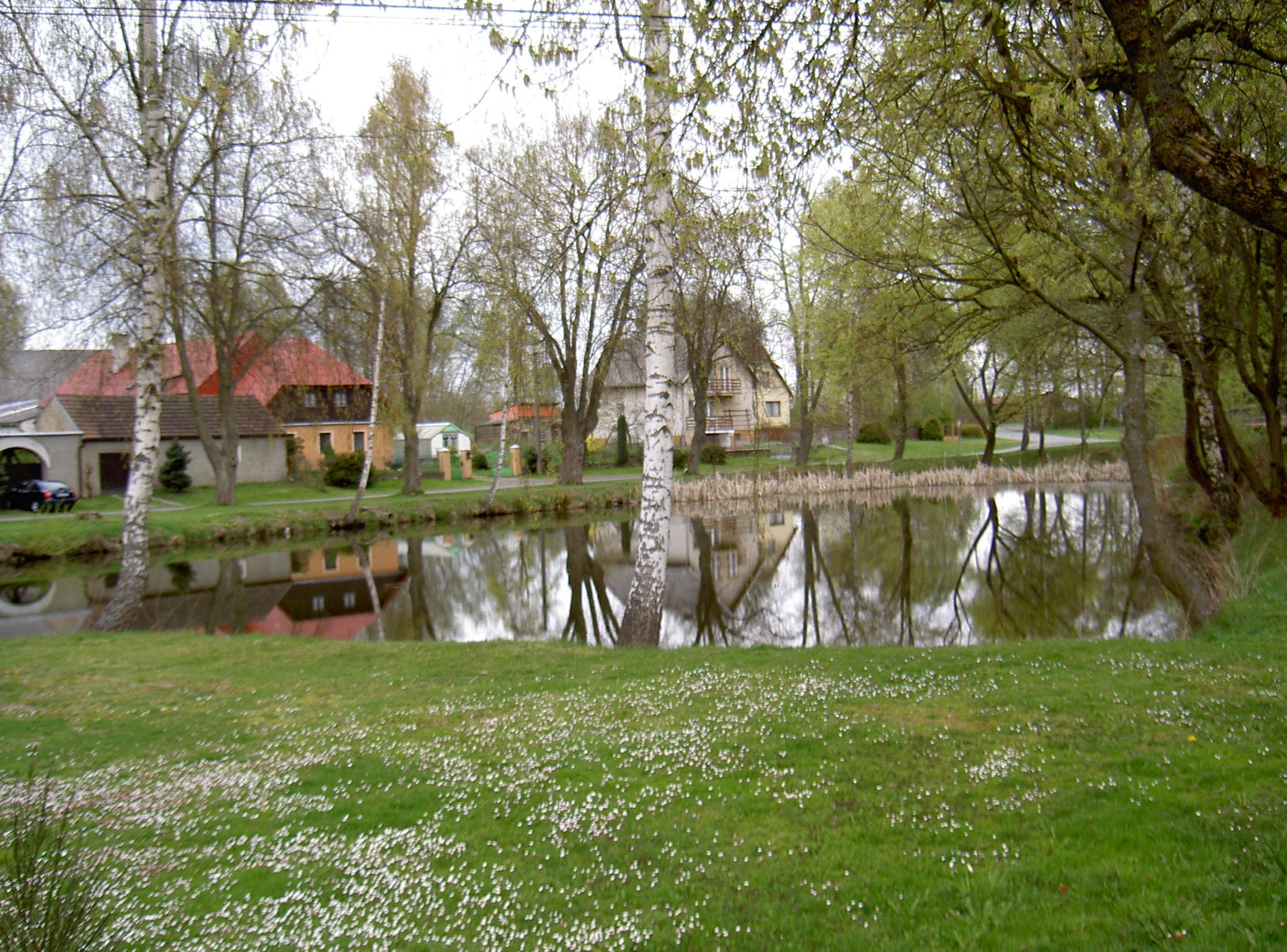
- Pond in Třemešné

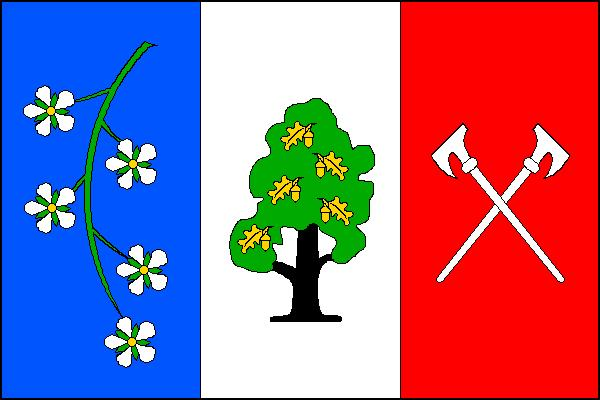
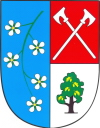
- Flag Coat of arms

- Location in the Czech Republic
- Coordinates: 49°37′31″N 12°41′45″E
- Country: Czech Republic
- Region: Plzeň
- District: Tachov
- First mentioned: 1436

Area
  - Total: 51.11 km^{2} (19.73 sq mi)
- Elevation: 510 m (1,670 ft)

Population (2026-01-01)
  - Total: 359
  - Density: 7.02/km^{2} (18.2/sq mi)
- Time zone: UTC+1 (CET)
  - Summer (DST): UTC+2 (CEST)
- Postal code: 348 06
- Website: www.obectremesne.cz

Třemešné is a municipality and village in Tachov District in the Plzeň Region of the Czech Republic. It has about 400 inhabitants.

Třemešné lies approximately 21 kilometres (13 mi) south of Tachov, 51 km (32 mi) west of Plzeň, and 134 km (83 mi) south-west of Prague.

== Administrative division ==
Třemešné consists of five municipal parts (in brackets population according to the 2021 census):

- Třemešné (167)
- Bezděkov (80)
- Dubec (28)
- Nová Ves (42)
- Pavlíkov (38)

== History ==
The first written mention of Třemešné is from 1436.

== Demographics ==
Historical population
Year	Pop.	±%
1869	2,262	—
1880	2,256	−0.3%
1890	2,115	−6.2%
1900	2,140	+1.2%
1910	2,183	+2.0%
1921	2,153	−1.4%
1930	2,180	+1.3%
1950	605	−72.2%
1961	439	−27.4%
1970	491	+11.8%
1980	396	−19.3%
1991	316	−20.2%
2001	374	+18.4%
2011	374	+0.0%
2021	355	−5.1%
Source: Censuses
