= Hradiště (Plzeň-South District) =

- Municipality
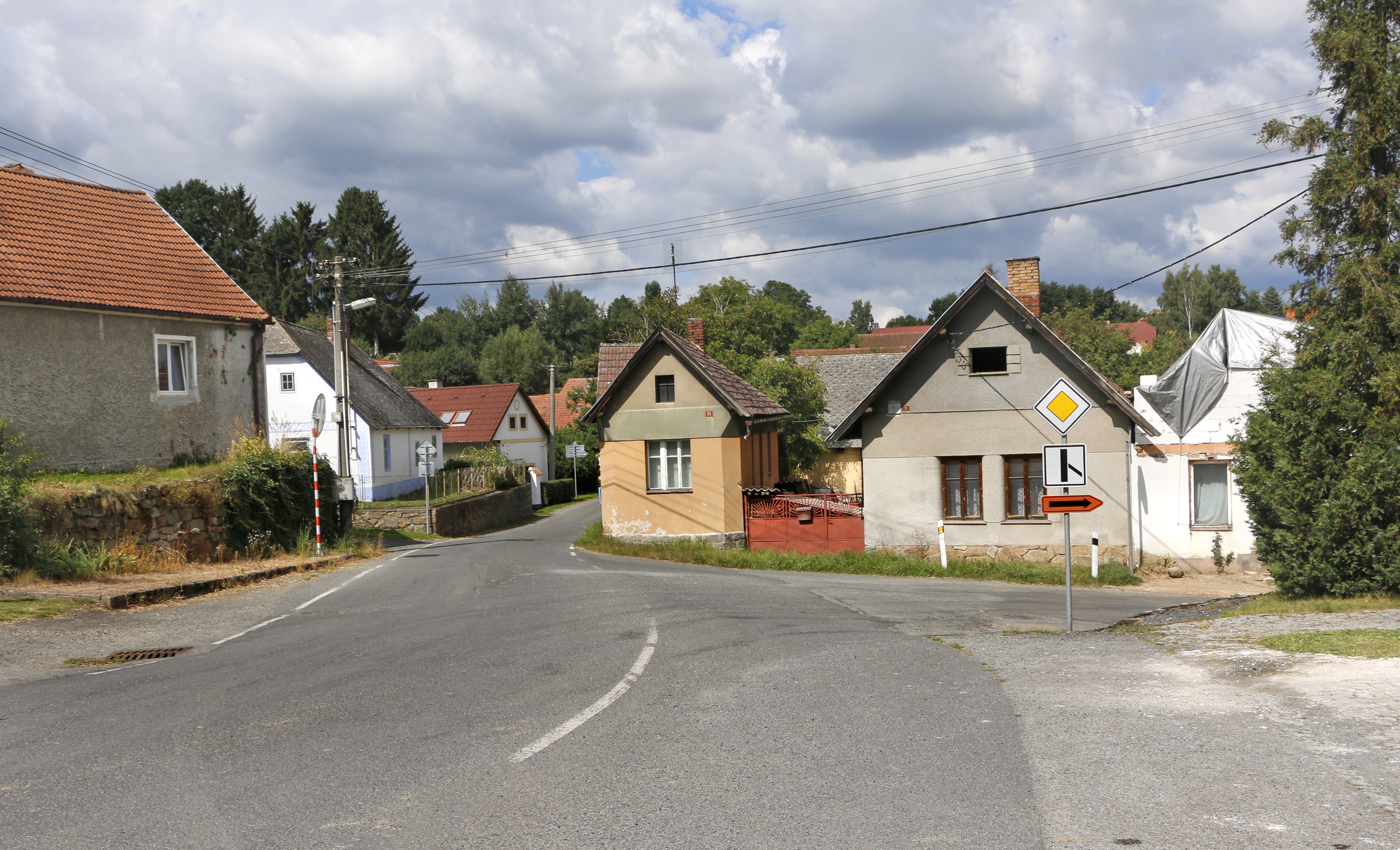
- Centre of Hradiště

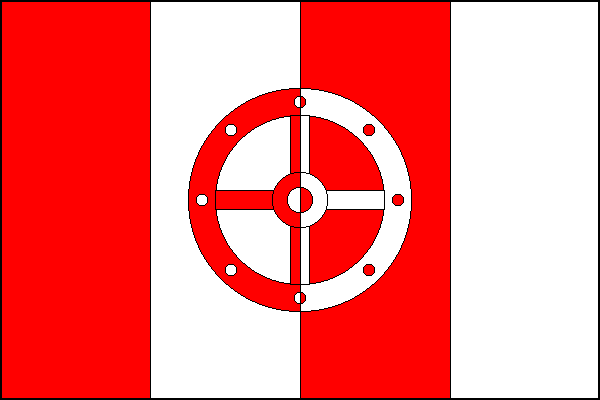
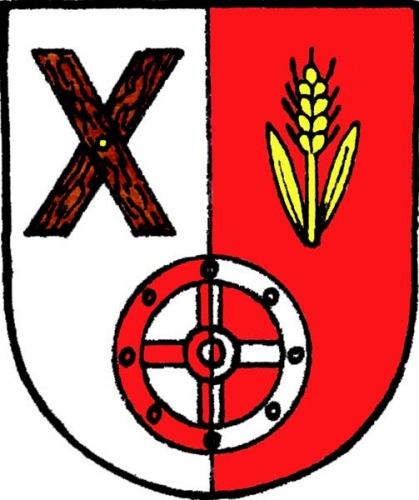
- Flag Coat of arms

- Location in the Czech Republic
- Coordinates: 49°26′22″N 13°45′22″E
- Country: Czech Republic
- Region: Plzeň
- District: Plzeň-South
- First mentioned: 1227

Area
  - Total: 13.61 km^{2} (5.25 sq mi)
- Elevation: 492 m (1,614 ft)

Population (2026-01-01)
  - Total: 219
  - Density: 16.1/km^{2} (41.7/sq mi)
- Time zone: UTC+1 (CET)
  - Summer (DST): UTC+2 (CEST)
- Postal code: 335 44
- Website: www.obec-hradiste.cz

Hradiště is a municipality and village in Plzeň-South District in the Plzeň Region of the Czech Republic. It has about 200 inhabitants.

Hradiště lies approximately 44 kilometres (27 mi) south-east of Plzeň and 87 km (54 mi) south-west of Prague.

== Administrative division ==
Hradiště consists of three municipal parts (in brackets population according to the 2021 census):

- Hradiště (111)
- Bezděkov (84)
- Zahorčičky (25)

== Demographics ==
Historical population
Year	Pop.	±%
1869	753	—
1880	777	+3.2%
1890	731	−5.9%
1900	750	+2.6%
1910	780	+4.0%
1921	739	−5.3%
1930	642	−13.1%
1950	525	−18.2%
1961	467	−11.0%
1970	395	−15.4%
1980	395	+0.0%
1991	310	−21.5%
2001	267	−13.9%
2011	223	−16.5%
2021	220	−1.3%
Source: Censuses
