= Pavlov (Jihlava District) =

- Municipality
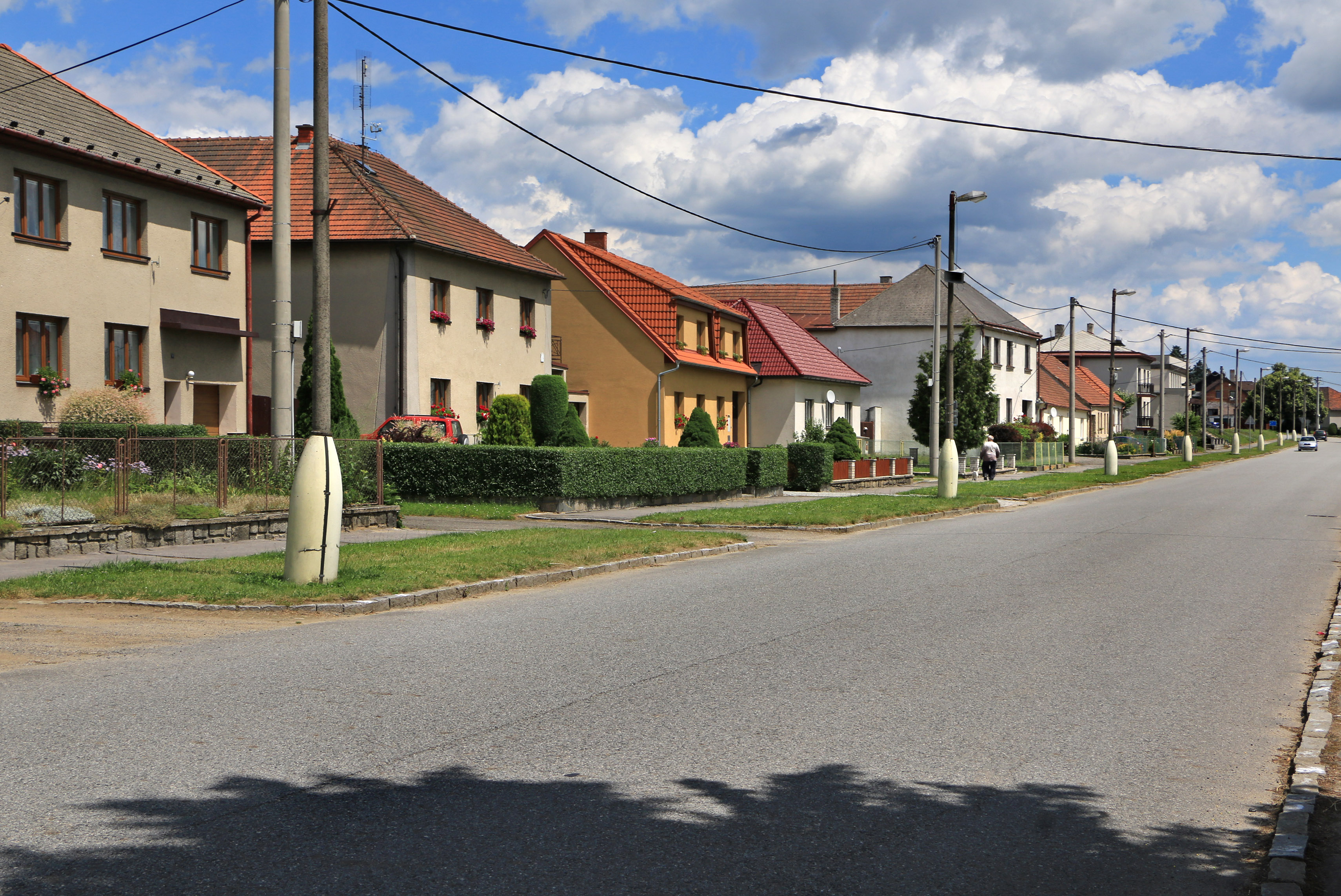
- Centre of Pavlov

- Flag Coat of arms

- Location in the Czech Republic
- Coordinates: 49°14′34″N 15°33′26″E
- Country: Czech Republic
- Region: Vysočina
- District: Jihlava
- First mentioned: 1358

Area
  - Total: 13.33 km^{2} (5.15 sq mi)
- Elevation: 658 m (2,159 ft)

Population (2026-01-01)
  - Total: 400
  - Density: 30/km^{2} (78/sq mi)
- Time zone: UTC+1 (CET)
  - Summer (DST): UTC+2 (CEST)
- Postal code: 588 33
- Website: www.obecpavlov.cz

Pavlov (Czech pronunciation: [ˈpavlof]) is a municipality and village in Jihlava District in the Vysočina Region of the Czech Republic. It has about 400 inhabitants.

Pavlov lies approximately 18 kilometres (11 mi) south of Jihlava and 125 km (78 mi) south-east of Prague.

== Administrative division ==
Pavlov consists of three municipal parts (in brackets population according to the 2021 census):

- Pavlov (324)
- Bezděkov (44)
- Stajiště (25)

== Demographics ==
Historical population
Year	Pop.	±%
1869	768	—
1880	786	+2.3%
1890	801	+1.9%
1900	758	−5.4%
1910	718	−5.3%
1921	766	+6.7%
1930	738	−3.7%
1950	587	−20.5%
1961	620	+5.6%
1970	586	−5.5%
1980	488	−16.7%
1991	461	−5.5%
2001	419	−9.1%
2011	410	−2.1%
2021	393	−4.1%
Source: Censuses
