= Bezděkov (Pardubice District) =

- Municipality
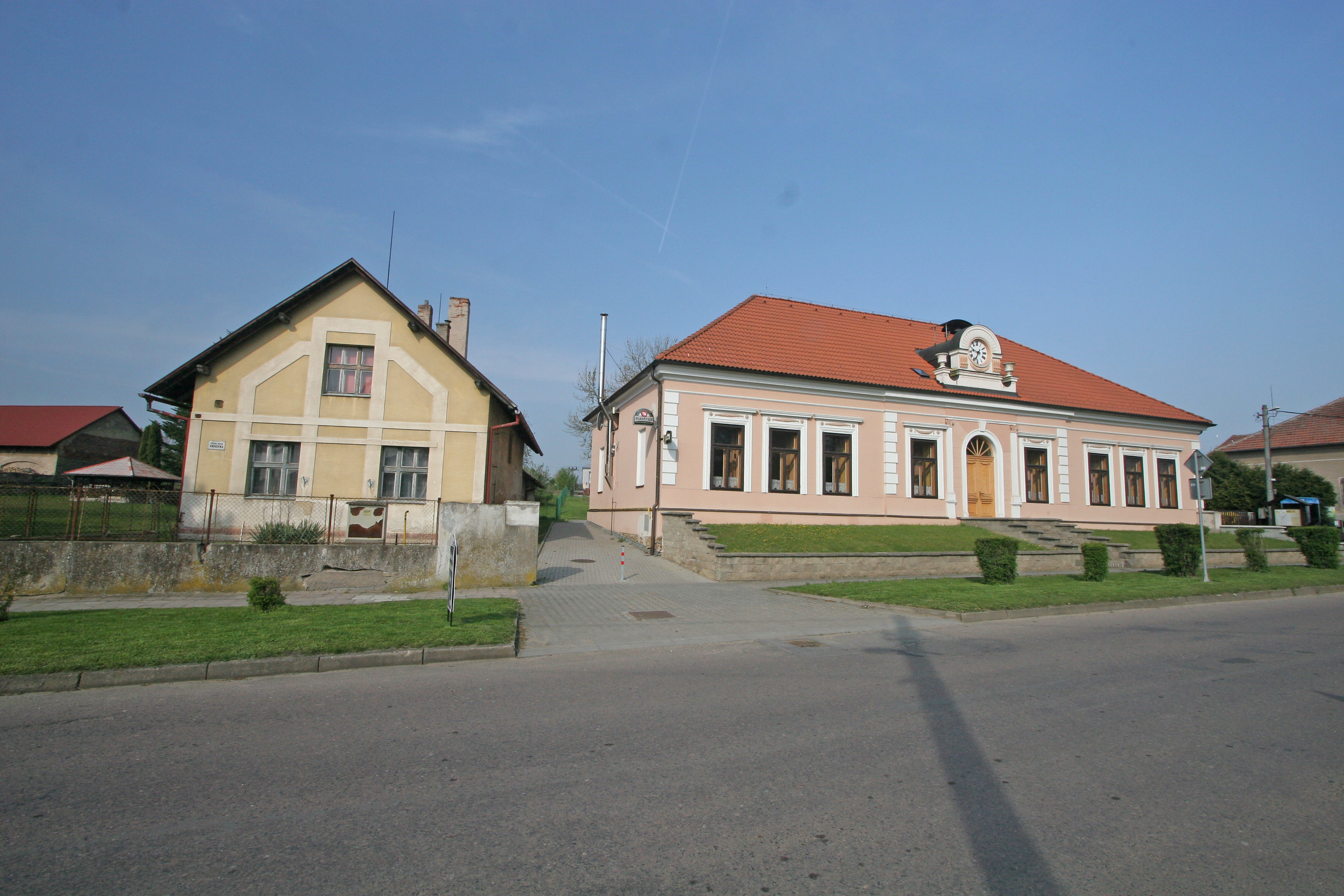
- Municipal office

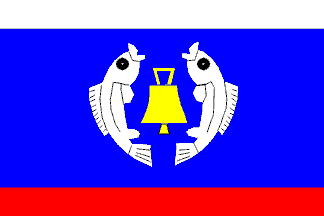
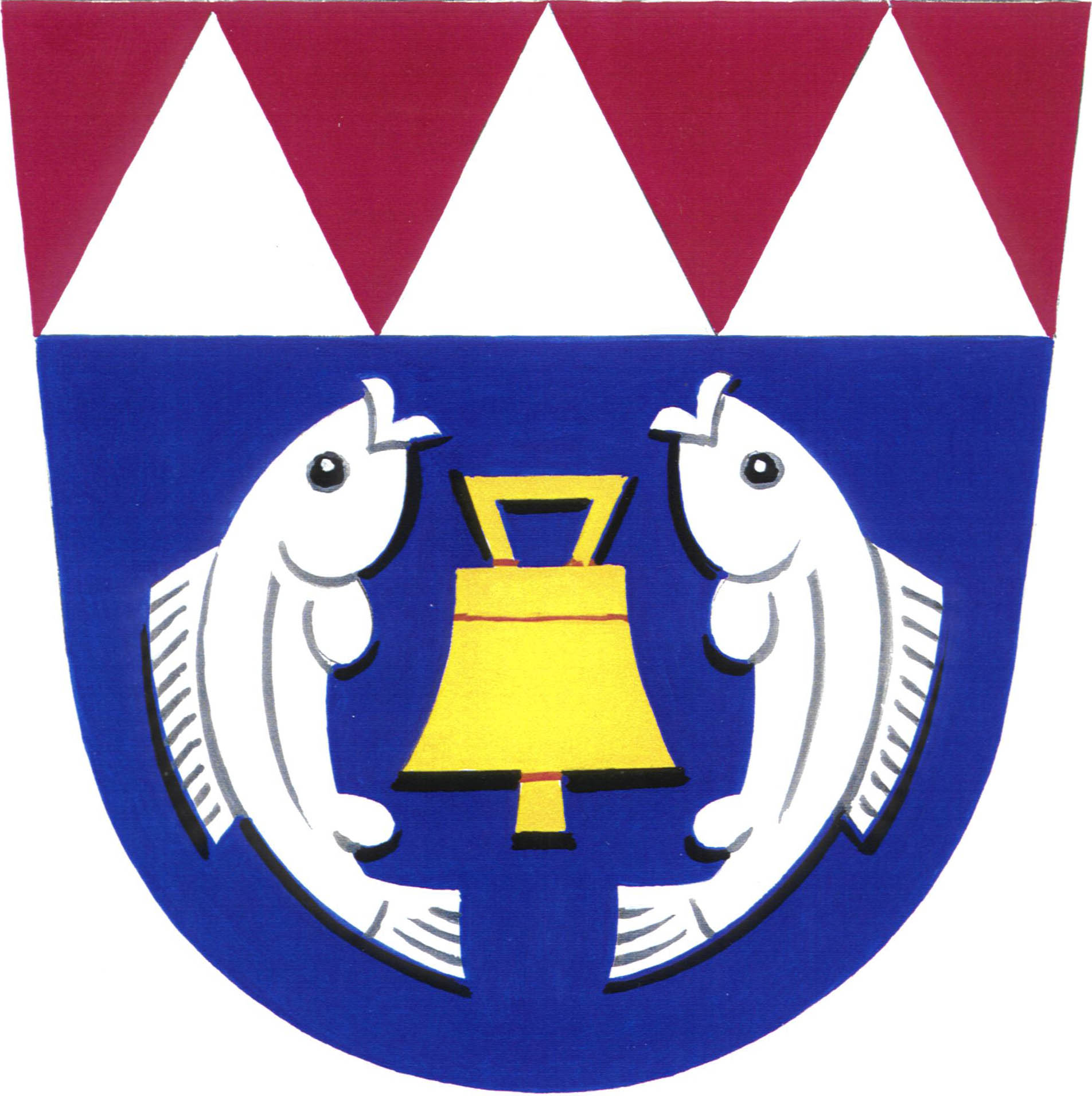
- Flag Coat of arms

- Location in the Czech Republic
- Coordinates: 50°0′32″N 15°38′41″E
- Country: Czech Republic
- Region: Pardubice
- District: Pardubice
- First mentioned: 1378

Area
  - Total: 5.27 km^{2} (2.03 sq mi)
- Elevation: 237 m (778 ft)

Population (2026-01-01)
  - Total: 352
  - Density: 66.8/km^{2} (173/sq mi)
- Time zone: UTC+1 (CET)
  - Summer (DST): UTC+2 (CEST)
- Postal code: 535 01
- Website: www.obecbezdekov.cz

Bezděkov is a municipality and village in Pardubice District in the Pardubice Region of the Czech Republic. It has about 400 inhabitants.

== Etymology ==
The name is derived from the personal name Bezděk, meaning "Bezděk's (court)".

== Demographics ==
Historical population
Year	Pop.	±%
1869	339	—
1880	402	+18.6%
1890	442	+10.0%
1900	408	−7.7%
1910	421	+3.2%
1921	467	+10.9%
1930	370	−20.8%
1950	342	−7.6%
1961	294	−14.0%
1970	266	−9.5%
1980	271	+1.9%
1991	278	+2.6%
2001	260	−6.5%
2011	293	+12.7%
2021	342	+16.7%
Source: Censuses
