= Horní Bezděkov =

- Municipality
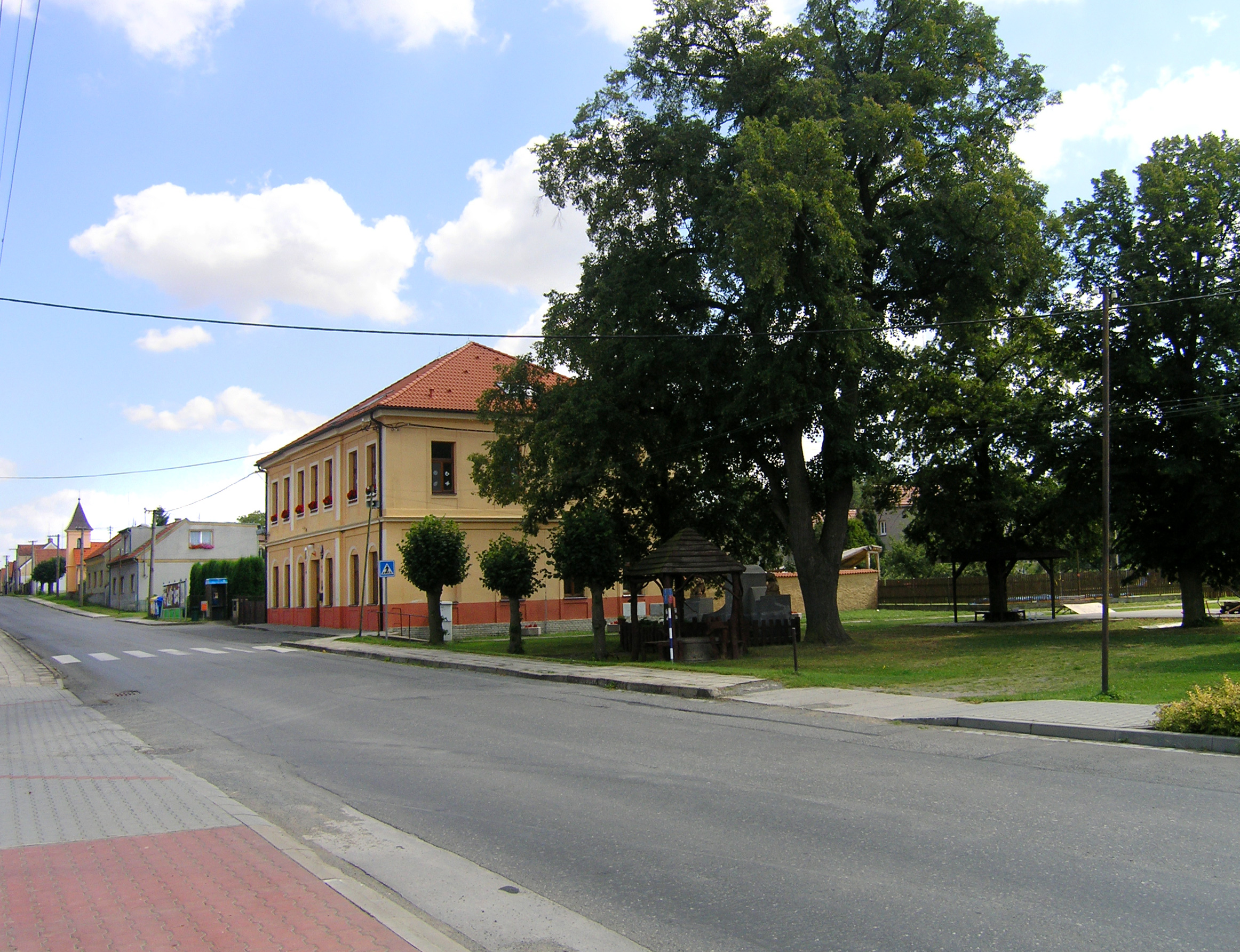
- Primary school and centre of the village

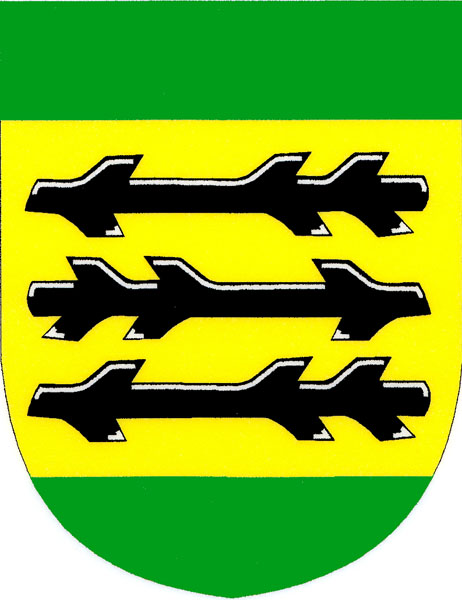
- Flag Coat of arms

- Location in the Czech Republic
- Coordinates: 50°4′56″N 14°4′3″E
- Country: Czech Republic
- Region: Central Bohemian
- District: Kladno
- First mentioned: 1260

Area
  - Total: 4.58 km^{2} (1.77 sq mi)
- Elevation: 421 m (1,381 ft)

Population (2026-01-01)
  - Total: 731
  - Density: 160/km^{2} (413/sq mi)
- Time zone: UTC+1 (CET)
  - Summer (DST): UTC+2 (CEST)
- Postal code: 273 51
- Website: www.horni-bezdekov.cz

Horní Bezděkov is a municipality and village in Kladno District in the Central Bohemian Region of the Czech Republic. It has about 700 inhabitants.

== Demographics ==
Historical population
Year	Pop.	±%
1869	240	—
1880	227	−5.4%
1890	177	−22.0%
1900	191	+7.9%
1910	270	+41.4%
1921	304	+12.6%
1930	273	−10.2%
1950	252	−7.7%
1961	306	+21.4%
1970	279	−8.8%
1980	301	+7.9%
1991	394	+30.9%
2001	439	+11.4%
2011	647	+47.4%
2021	778	+20.2%
Source: Censuses
