= Bezděkov pod Třemšínem =

- Municipality
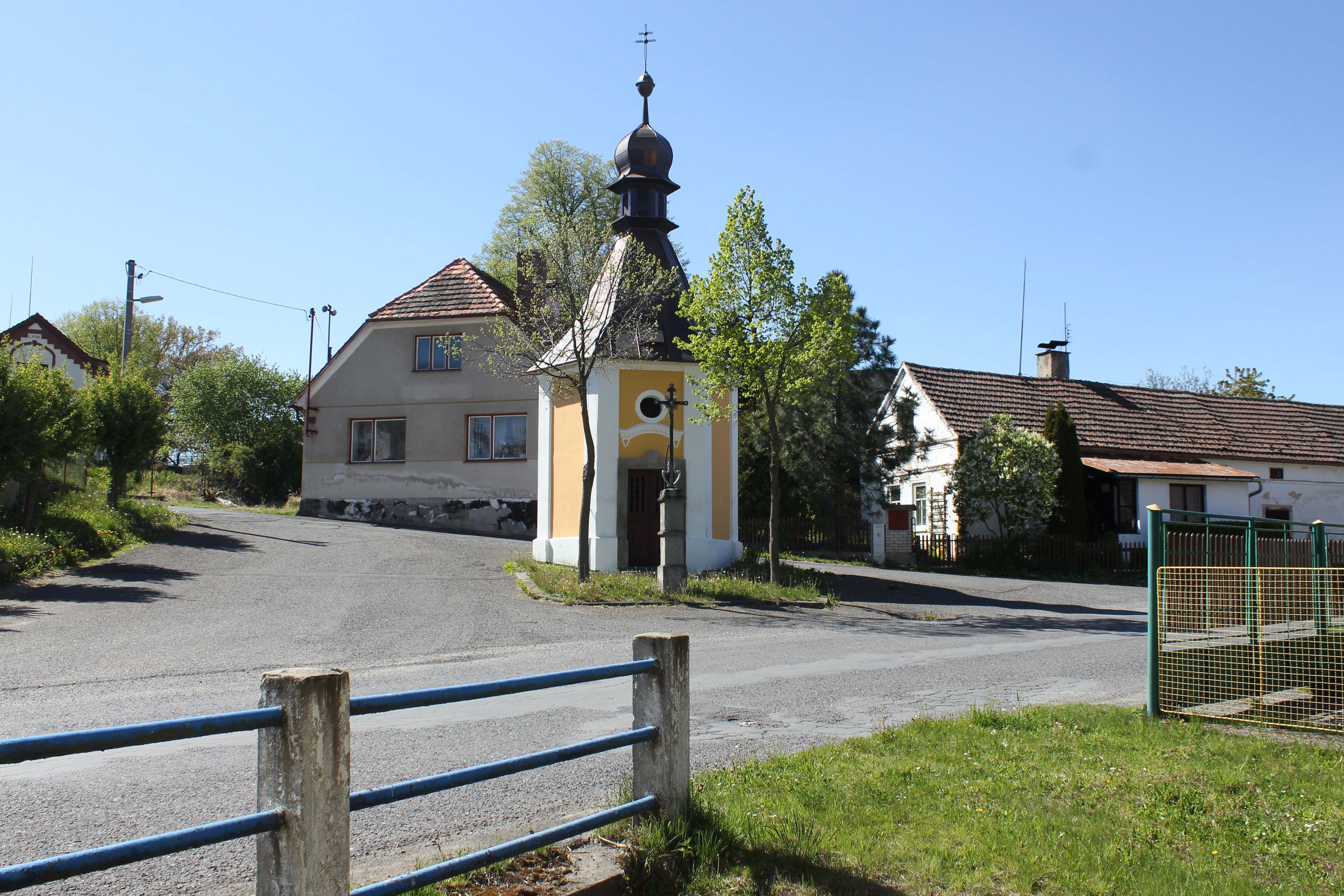
- Chapel of the Holy Trinity

- Location in the Czech Republic
- Coordinates: 49°34′38″N 13°52′43″E
- Country: Czech Republic
- Region: Central Bohemian
- District: Příbram
- First mentioned: 1544

Area
  - Total: 3.63 km^{2} (1.40 sq mi)
- Elevation: 550 m (1,800 ft)

Population (2026-01-01)
  - Total: 168
  - Density: 46.3/km^{2} (120/sq mi)
- Time zone: UTC+1 (CET)
  - Summer (DST): UTC+2 (CEST)
- Postal code: 262 42
- Website: www.bezdekovptr.cz

Bezděkov pod Třemšínem (until 1950 Bezděkov) is a municipality and village in Příbram District in the Central Bohemian Region of the Czech Republic. It has about 200 inhabitants.

== Demographics ==
Historical population
Year	Pop.	±%
1869	304	—
1880	313	+3.0%
1890	299	−4.5%
1900	282	−5.7%
1910	275	−2.5%
1921	244	−11.3%
1930	229	−6.1%
1950	161	−29.7%
1961	153	−5.0%
1970	160	+4.6%
1980	174	+8.7%
1991	142	−18.4%
2001	143	+0.7%
2011	155	+8.4%
2021	155	+0.0%
Source: Censuses
