= Krásná Hora =

- Municipality
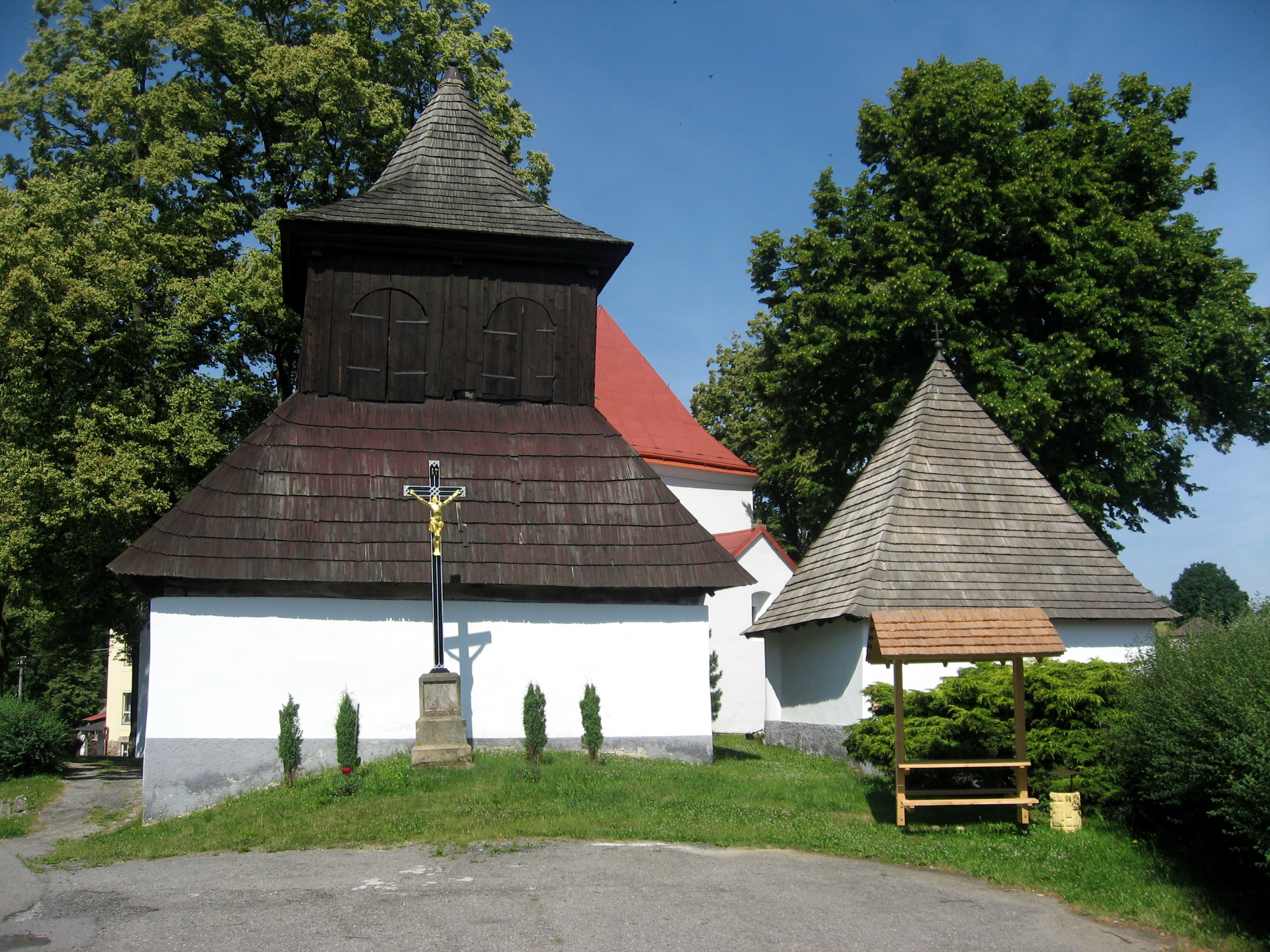
- Wooden belfry

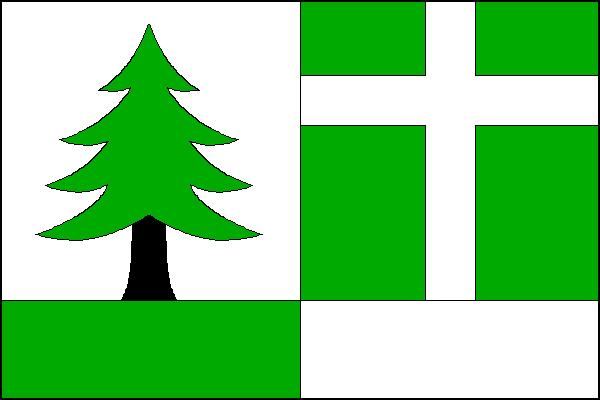
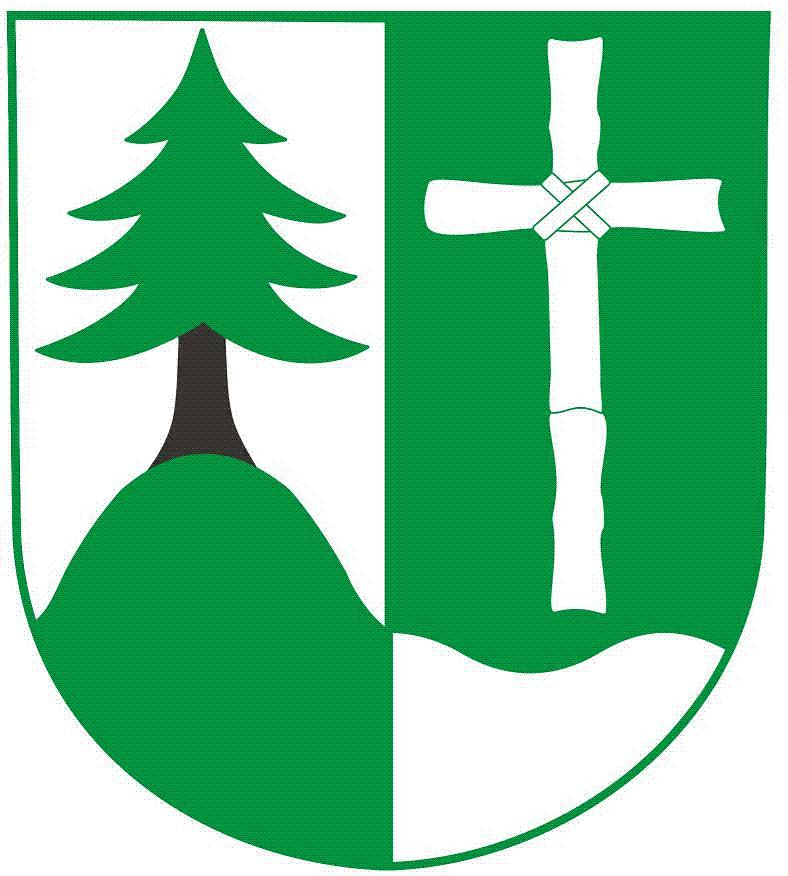
- Flag Coat of arms

- Location in the Czech Republic
- Coordinates: 49°36′10″N 15°28′13″E
- Country: Czech Republic
- Region: Vysočina
- District: Havlíčkův Brod
- First mentioned: 1379

Area
  - Total: 22.22 km^{2} (8.58 sq mi)
- Elevation: 440 m (1,440 ft)

Population (2026-01-01)
  - Total: 507
  - Density: 22.8/km^{2} (59.1/sq mi)
- Time zone: UTC+1 (CET)
  - Summer (DST): UTC+2 (CEST)
- Postal codes: 580 01, 582 34, 582 91
- Website: www.krasnahora.cz

Krásná Hora is a municipality and village in Havlíčkův Brod District in the Vysočina Region of the Czech Republic. It has about 500 inhabitants.

== Administrative division ==
Krásná Hora consists of nine municipal parts (in brackets population according to the 2021 census):

- Krásná Hora (272)
- Bezděkov (49)
- Bratroňov (38)
- Broumova Lhota (83)
- Čekánov (18)
- Hlavňov (17)
- Kojkovičky (17)
- Vítonín (7)
- Volichov (18)

== History ==
The first written mention of Krásná Hora is from 1379.

== Demographics ==
Historical population
Year	Pop.	±%
1869	1,516	—
1880	1,521	+0.3%
1890	1,536	+1.0%
1900	1,537	+0.1%
1910	1,565	+1.8%
1921	1,559	−0.4%
1930	1,461	−6.3%
1950	1,083	−25.9%
1961	1,081	−0.2%
1970	844	−21.9%
1980	696	−17.5%
1991	556	−20.1%
2001	542	−2.5%
2011	538	−0.7%
2021	519	−3.5%
Source: Censuses
