= Nadějkov =

- Municipality
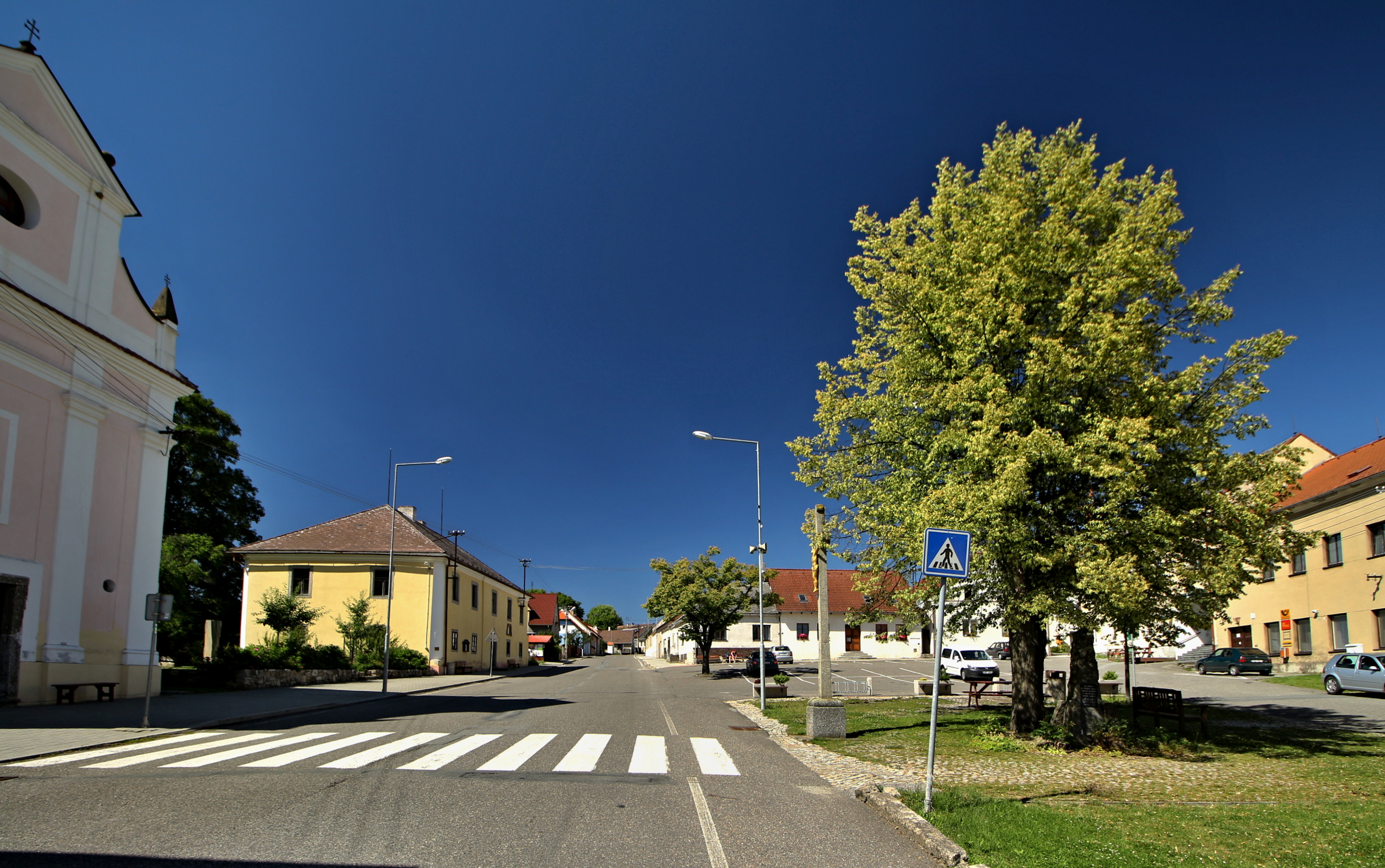
- Centre of Nadějkov

- Location in the Czech Republic
- Coordinates: 49°30′10″N 14°28′45″E
- Country: Czech Republic
- Region: South Bohemian
- District: Tábor
- First mentioned: 1373

Area
  - Total: 24.22 km^{2} (9.35 sq mi)
- Elevation: 535 m (1,755 ft)

Population (2026-01-01)
  - Total: 723
  - Density: 29.9/km^{2} (77.3/sq mi)
- Time zone: UTC+1 (CET)
  - Summer (DST): UTC+2 (CEST)
- Postal codes: 398 52, 399 01
- Website: www.nadejkov.cz

Nadějkov is a municipality and village in Tábor District in the South Bohemian Region of the Czech Republic. It has about 700 inhabitants.

Nadějkov lies approximately 17 kilometres (11 mi) north-west of Tábor, 60 km (37 mi) north of České Budějovice, and 65 km (40 mi) south of Prague.

== Administrative division ==
Nadějkov consists of 18 municipal parts (in brackets population according to the 2021 census):

- Nadějkov (396)
- Bezděkov (11)
- Brtec (36)
- Chlístov (6)
- Číčovice (0)
- Hronova Vesec (27)
- Hubov (21)
- Kaliště (45)
- Křenovy Dvory (5)
- Modlíkov (18)
- Mozolov (12)
- Nepřejov (7)
- Petříkovice (27)
- Pohořelice (0)
- Šichova Vesec (9)
- Starcova Lhota (30)
- Větrov (15)
- Vratišov (14)

== History ==
The first written mention of Nadějkov is from 1373.

== Demographics ==
Historical population
| Year | Pop. | ±% |
|---|---|---|
| 1869 | 1,793 | — |
| 1880 | 1,854 | +3.4% |
| 1890 | 1,745 | −5.9% |
| 1900 | 1,661 | −4.8% |
| 1910 | 1,583 | −4.7% |
| 1921 | 1,526 | −3.6% |
| 1930 | 1,414 | −7.3% |
| 1950 | 1,053 | −25.5% |
| 1961 | 1,110 | +5.4% |
| 1970 | 960 | −13.5% |
| 1980 | 868 | −9.6% |
| 1991 | 791 | −8.9% |
| 2001 | 735 | −7.1% |
| 2011 | 708 | −3.7% |
| 2021 | 679 | −4.1% |
Source: Censuses
