= Přívětice =

- Municipality
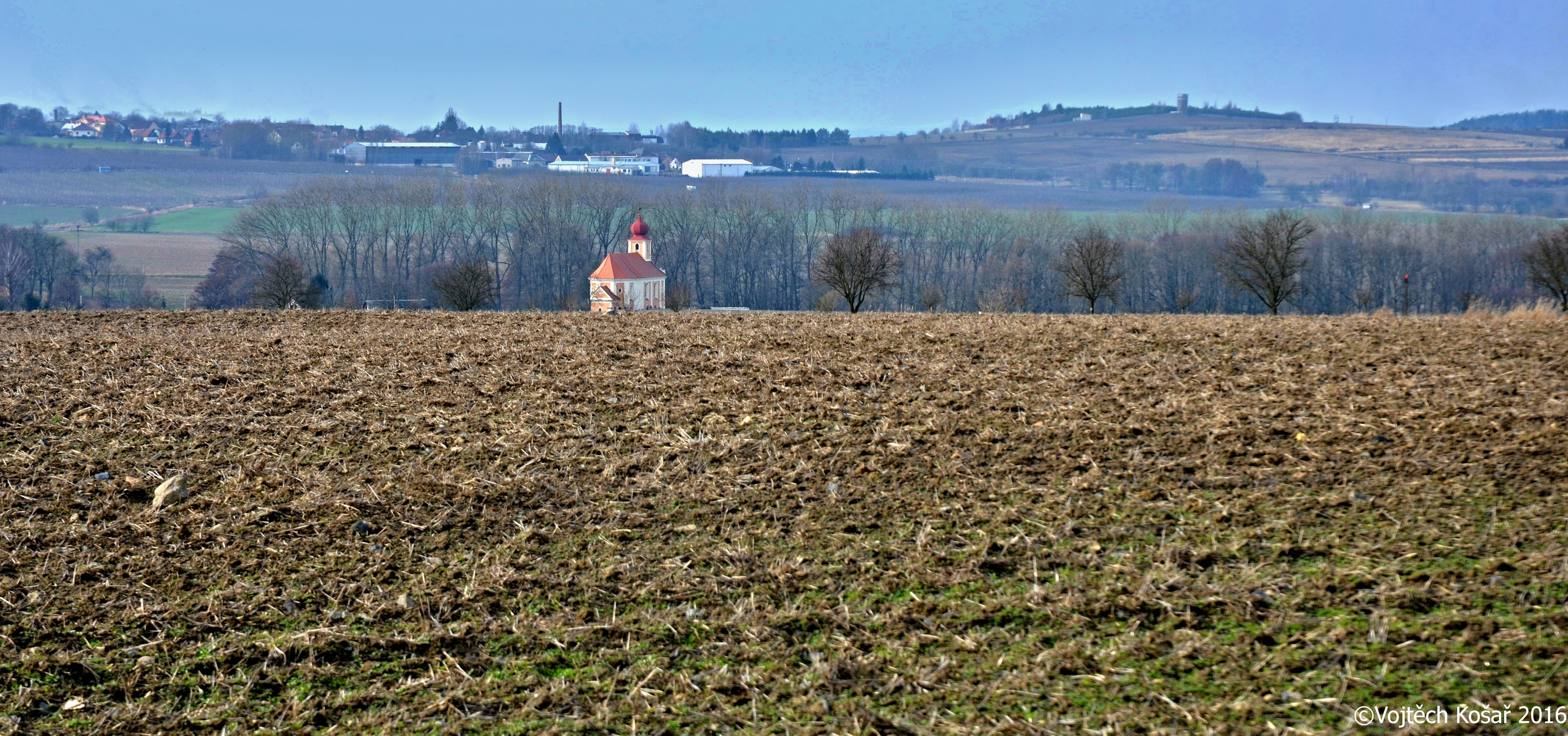
- Church of Saint Martin seen from the east

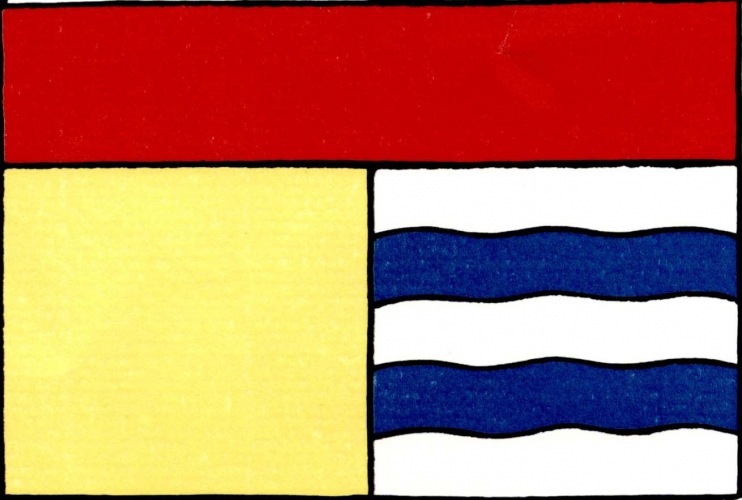
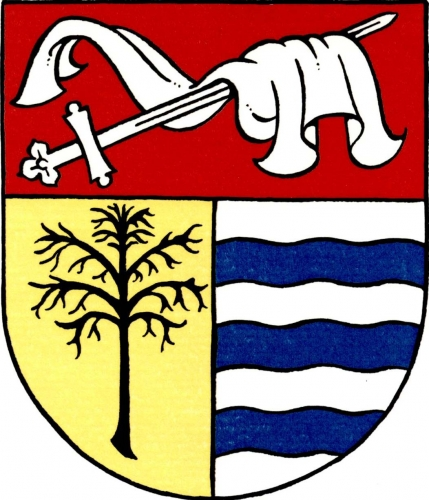
- Flag Coat of arms

- Location in the Czech Republic
- Coordinates: 49°50′5″N 13°36′44″E
- Country: Czech Republic
- Region: Plzeň
- District: Rokycany
- First mentioned: 1325

Area
  - Total: 20.65 km^{2} (7.97 sq mi)
- Elevation: 427 m (1,401 ft)

Population (2026-01-01)
  - Total: 197
  - Density: 9.54/km^{2} (24.7/sq mi)
- Time zone: UTC+1 (CET)
  - Summer (DST): UTC+2 (CEST)
- Postal code: 338 28
- Website: www.privetice.cz

Přívětice is a municipality and village in Rokycany District in the Plzeň Region of the Czech Republic. It has about 200 inhabitants.

Přívětice lies approximately 10 kilometres (6 mi) north of Rokycany, 20 km (12 mi) north-east of Plzeň, and 65 km (40 mi) south-west of Prague.

== Administrative division ==
Přívětice consists of two municipal parts (in brackets population according to the 2021 census):

- Přívětice (194)
- Sklená Huť (15)

== Demographics ==
Historical population
Year	Pop.	±%
1869	707	—
1880	835	+18.1%
1890	814	−2.5%
1900	699	−14.1%
1910	608	−13.0%
1921	634	+4.3%
1930	564	−11.0%
1950	451	−20.0%
1961	383	−15.1%
1970	320	−16.4%
1980	277	−13.4%
1991	220	−20.6%
2001	210	−4.5%
2011	196	−6.7%
2021	209	+6.6%
Source: Censuses
