= Polička =

Town in Pardubice Region, Czech Republic

- Town
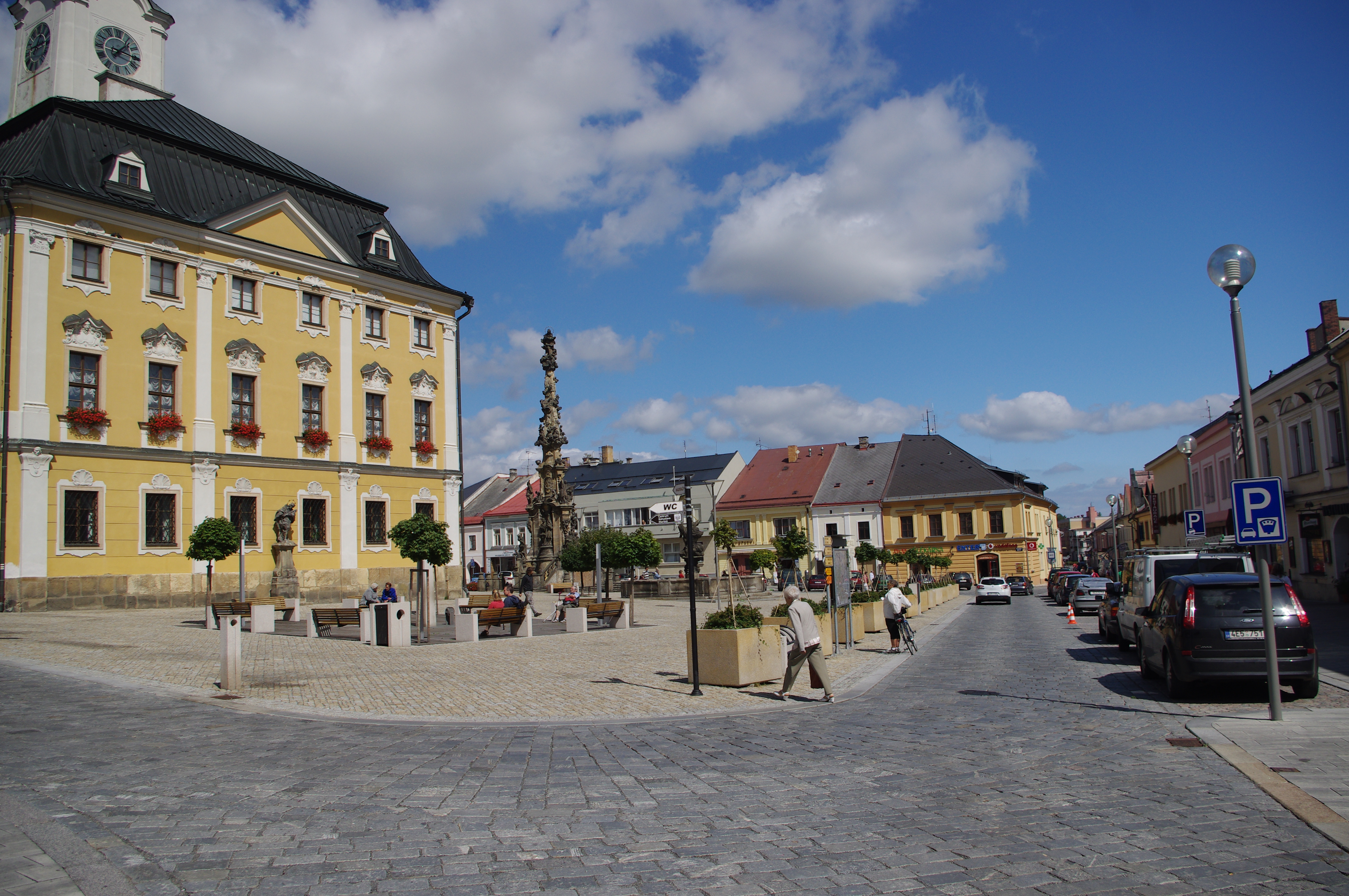
- Palackého náměstí with the Marian column

- Flag Coat of arms

- Location in the Czech Republic
- Coordinates: 49°42′54″N 16°16′3″E
- Country: Czech Republic
- Region: Pardubice
- District: Svitavy
- Founded: 1265

Government
  - Mayor: Jaroslav Martinů (ODS)

Area
  - Total: 33.12 km^{2} (12.79 sq mi)
- Elevation: 555 m (1,821 ft)

Population (2026-01-01)
  - Total: 9,035
  - Density: 272.8/km^{2} (706.5/sq mi)
- Time zone: UTC+1 (CET)
  - Summer (DST): UTC+2 (CEST)
- Postal code: 572 01
- Website: www.policka.org

Polička (Czech pronunciation: [ˈpolɪtʃka]; German: Politschka) is a town in Svitavy District in the Pardubice Region of the Czech Republic. It has about 9,000 inhabitants. Polička is located in the Svitavy Uplands, on the borderline of the historical lands of Bohemia and Moravia.

Polička was founded in 1265. The historic town centre is well preserved and is protected as an urban monument zone. The main landmarks of Polička are the Church of Saint James the Great with the birthplace of Bohuslav Martinů and the Baroque town hall, both protected as national cultural monuments. The town is also known for its fortifications that are among the best-preserved in Central Europe.

== Administrative division ==
Polička consists of six municipal parts (in brackets population according to the 2021 census):

- Polička-Město (568)
- Dolní Předměstí (1,916)
- Horní Předměstí (5,610)
- Lezník (215)
- Modřec (137)
- Střítež (176)

== Etymology ==
Polička was founded in the area of meadows and forests called Napolickach, which most likely meant "on the plains", and the town's name was derived from this local name.

== Geography ==
Polička is located about 14 kilometres (9 mi) west of Svitavy and 49 km (30 mi) southeast of Pardubice. It lies in the Svitavy Uplands. The highest point is at 650 m (2,130 ft) above sea level. It is situated on the borderline of the historical lands of Bohemia and Moravia. The stream Bílý potok flows through the town and supplies the fishpond Synský rybník in the centre of the town.

== History ==
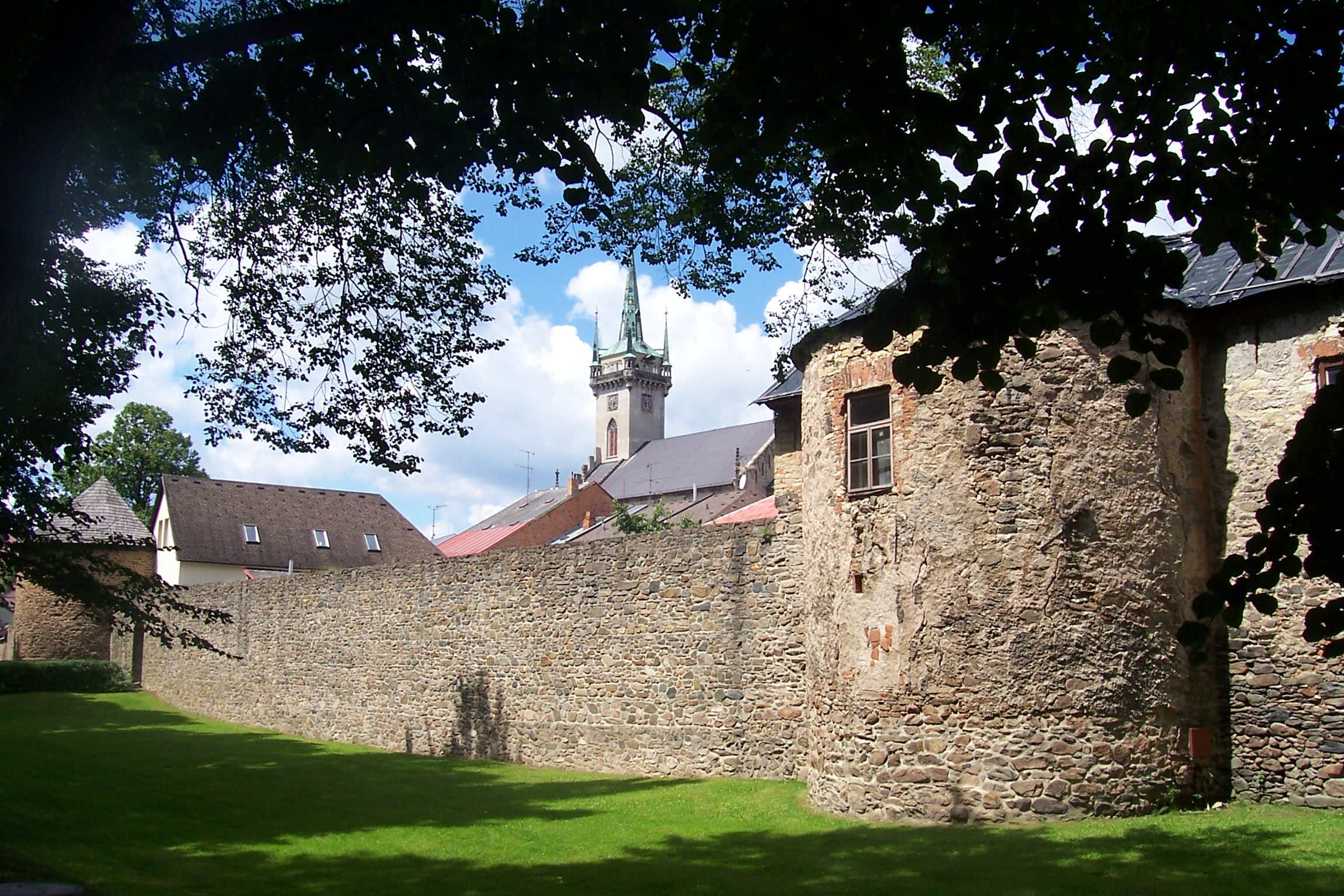
Part of the town walls

Until 1200, the area was under the administration of the Praemonstratensian monastery in Litomyšl. Polička was founded in 1265 by King Ottokar II of Bohemia to defend the country's trading route from Moravia to Bohemia through dense forests. On 27 September 1265, Ottokar II issued a decree in which he ordered the lokator Conrad of Lewendorf to take care of setting up the new town.

In the first decades of its existence, the town was administered from the Svojanov Castle. In 1307, Polička was donated to Queen Elizabeth Richeza by her husband King Rudolf I and for next centuries became a dowry town, administered by Bohemian queens. During the reign of Charles IV, the town streets were paved, stone houses built, and the town fortified.

In 1421, Polička was taken by Jan Žižka and afterwards plundered by one of Hungarian armies of Sigismund. After the Hussite Wars, Germans were expelled and Polička became a purely Czech town.

=== 16th–18th centuries ===
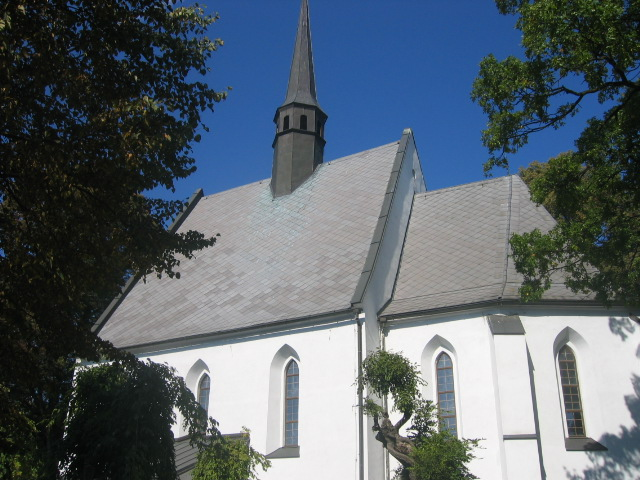
Church of Saint Michael

Polička enjoyed the favour of the Jagiellonian dynasty during their rule. Later, the town actively participated in the fight against Ferdinand I. In 1547 after Ferdinand I got to power, Polička was punished by suspension of its rights, fined, and its real estate was confiscated. Twelve years later, the town had to purchase the property for additional money.

In the second half of the 16th century, the town prospered and Renaissance-style buildings started to be built. including the Church of Saint Michael. In 1613, Polička was devastated by fire. Only the southwestern part of the town the Gothic town hall, church, rectory and school were spared. Polička did not prosper well during the Thirty Years' War either and was conquered and looted several times. The town subsequently depopulated.

Until the end of the 17th century, Polička recovered. In the 18th century, it again prospered and Baroque reconstructions were made all over the town.

=== 19th–20th centuries ===
Polička kept its Baroque appearance until 1845 when it was hit by another fire, which destroyed most of the houses and the Church of Saint James the Great. The fire has considerably slowed development of the town and therefore the town walls were not torn down and are preserved to this day. During the second half of the 19th century the town experienced a significant cultural development. In 1896, Polička was connected to the national railway network. This started the industrial development of the town.

In the first half of the 20th century a number of significant building were built in the town, for example Tyl House, Sokol Gymnasium and the building of the current secondary grammar school. Until 1918, Polička was part of Austria-Hungary. In October and November 1938, Polička was occupied by Nazi Germany. Between 1939 and 1945, the town belonged to the Protectorate of Bohemia and Moravia. After World War II, the town lost about one thousand inhabitants to the abandoned areas from where the original German population was expelled.

== Demographics ==
Historical population

Year	Pop.	±%
1869	5,531	—
1880	5,746	+3.9%
1890	5,691	−1.0%
1900	6,163	+8.3%
1910	6,453	+4.7%

Year	Pop.	±%
1921	6,216	−3.7%
1930	7,276	+17.1%
1950	6,451	−11.3%
1961	6,863	+6.4%
1970	7,266	+5.9%

Year	Pop.	±%
1980	8,972	+23.5%
1991	8,987	+0.2%
2001	9,187	+2.2%
2011	8,948	−2.6%
2021	8,622	−3.6%

Source: Censuses

== Economy ==
The largest employer based in the town is Ravensburger Karton, manufacturer of toys and games with more than 500 employees.

== Transport ==
The I/34 road (the section from Svitavy to Havlíčkův Brod) runs through the town.

Polička is located on the railway line heading from Česká Třebová and Svitavy to Skuteč.

== Sights ==
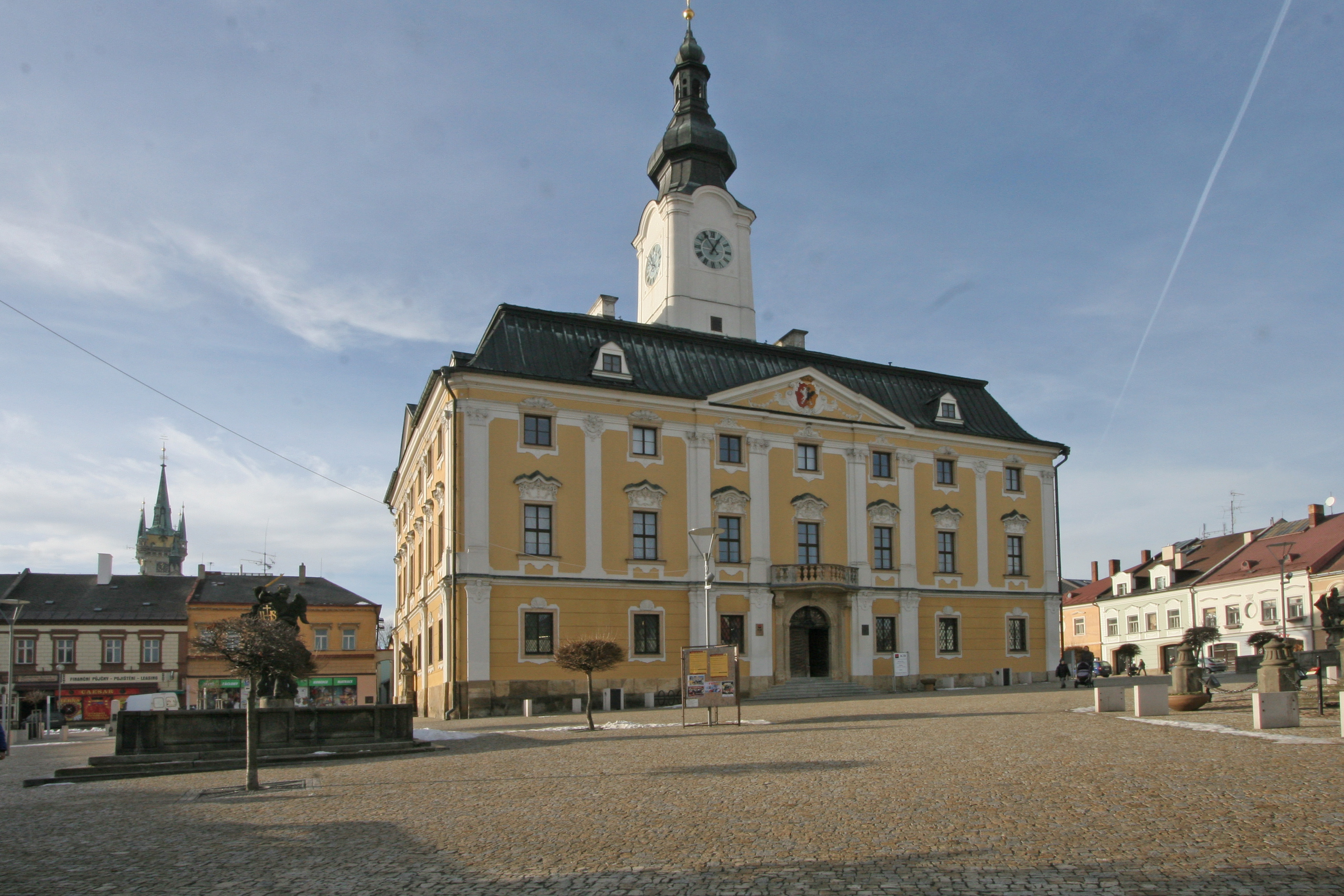
Town hall

The historic centre is formed by the square Palackého náměstí and adjacent streets. The square includes one of the most significant Baroque town halls in the country. It was built in 1739–1744, when it replaced an old Gothic town hall. The Baroque 22-metre (72 ft) high Marian column on the town square was built in 1727–1731 and was probably designed by the architect František Maxmilián Kaňka. The town hall and the Marian column are together protected as one national cultural monument.

Massive stone walls with 19 bastions are among the best-preserved fortifications in Central Europe. They are 1,220 metres (4,000 ft) long and surround the entire historic town centre.

The original Church of Saint James the Great was built in 1265. It was replaced by the a church in the 1360s–1380s, which was later reconstructed in the Baroque style. After the fire in 1845, the current Neo-Gothic church was built on its site in 1853–1865. The tower of the church serves as a lookout point and contains the room in which the composer Bohuslav Martinů, the most notable native of Polička, was born. It is protected as a national cultural monument and is open to the public.

The Church of Saint Michael was built before 1580. It is a Renaissance cemetery church with Gothic elements.

== Notable people ==
- Arne Novák (1880–1939), literary historian and critic; died here
- Josef Šebestián Daubek (1842–1922), Czech-Austrian politician and entrepreneur
- Antonín Eltschkner (1880–1961), priest and Esperantist
- Bohuslav Martinů (1890–1959), composer
- Martin Doktor (born 1974), sprint canoeist, Olympic champion
- Tomáš Čupr (born 1982), entrepreneur
- Kamila Vokoun Hájková (born 1987), ice dancer

== Twin towns – sister cities ==
Polička is twinned with:

- Ebes, Hungary
- Hohenems, Austria
- Westerveld, Netherlands
