= Czech lands in the High Middle Ages =

Historical period from 1130 to 1335

Lands of the King of Bohemia Přemyslid state
- 1110–1335 (historical period)
- Top: Royal banner of the Kingdom of Bohemia; Bottom: Banner of the Margraviate of Moravia Coat of arms of the King of Bohemia Coat of arms of the Margrave of Moravia

- The Přemyslid state during the reign of Ottokar II

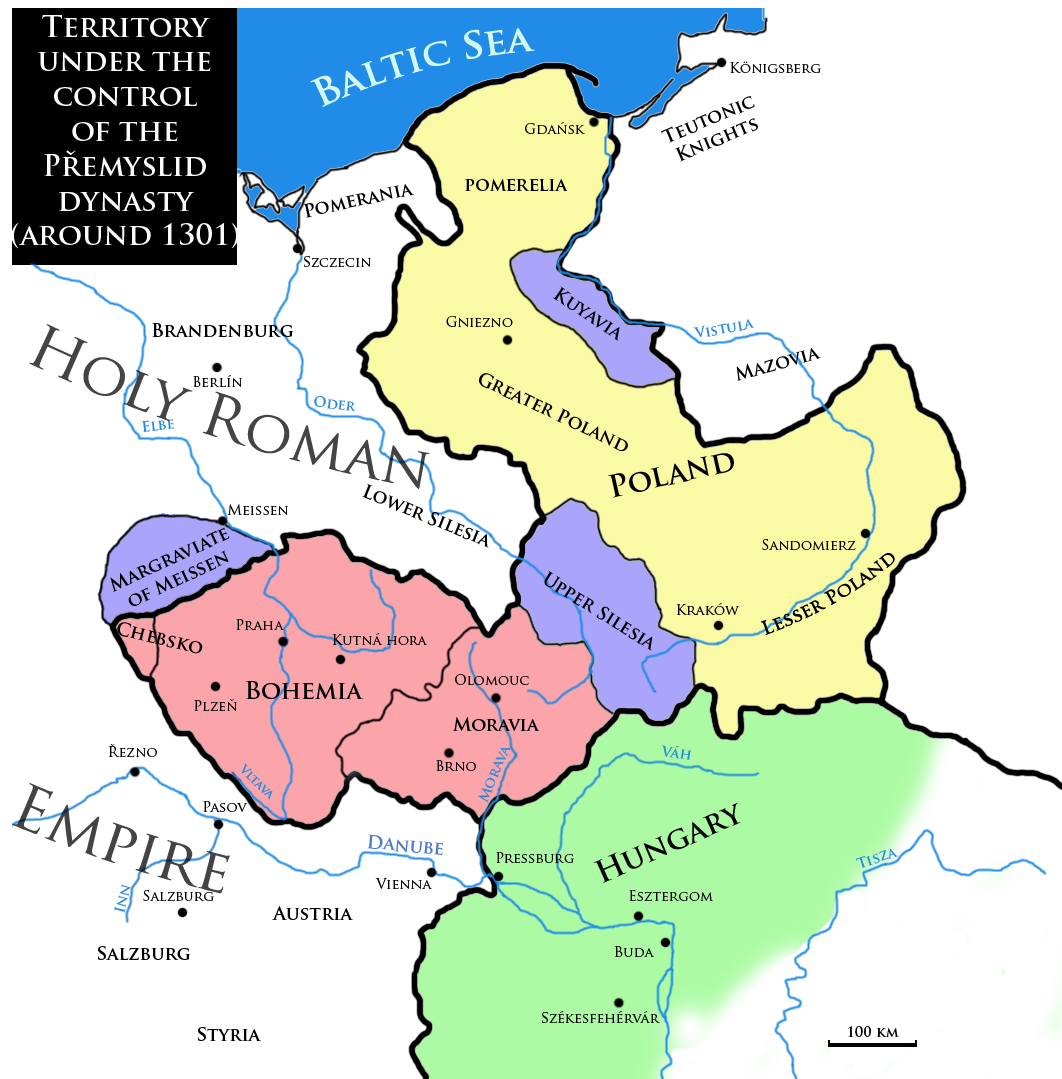
- The Přemyslid state (Czech lands are red) in the early 14th century
- Status: Personal union of Přemyslids and Luxembourgs, territories of the Holy Roman Empire
- Capital: Prague
- Common languages: Czech, German, Latin, Polish
- Religion: Roman Catholicism; Judaism (Jews); Eastern Orthodoxy (incorporated into Catholicism as liturgy)
- Government: Feudal monarchy
- King
- History
  - Duchy of Bohemia raised to kingdom: 1198
  - Bohemian Crown lands established: 7 April 1348
Preceded by
Duchy of Bohemia
Duchy of Moravia
Babenberg possessions
Succeeded by
Lands of the Bohemian Crown
- Today part of: Czech Republic; ∟ Bohemia; ∟ Moravia; ∟ Czech Silesia

The history of the Czech lands in the High Middle Ages encompasses the period from the rule of Vladislav II (c.1110–1174 AD) to that of Henry of Bohemia (c.1265–1335). The High Middle Ages includes the 11th, 12th, and 13th centuries (c. 1000–1299). It was preceded by the Early Middle Ages (the fifth to the tenth centuries) and followed by the Late Middle Ages, which ended about 1500. The High Middle Ages produced a number of intellectual, spiritual and artistic works and saw the rise of ethnocentrism, which evolved into nationalism. The rediscovery of the works of Aristotle led Thomas Aquinas and other thinkers of the period to develop the instructional method of scholasticism. In architecture, many notable Gothic cathedrals were built or completed during this era.

== History ==
=== Hereditary law ===
After the death of Vladislav II in 1174, wrangling for the Prague throne began among members of the Přemyslid Dynasty, indicating that the order of succession begun by Bretislav I was obsolete. Disputes within the ruling dynasty were exploited by Holy Roman Emperor Friedrich I Barbarossa, who established the Margraviate of Moravia as an imperial princedom whose prince was subordinate to the Holy Roman sovereign, and did the same with the Prague bishopric in 1187. Friedrich I died three years later and the confusion was addressed by the German parts of the Empire, so the Přemyslids gained time. The Margraviate of Moravia kept its name for a half-century, with its ruler known as the margrave, but it fell under the sovereignty of the Bohemian monarch, who kept the office or entrusted it to close relatives.

Ottokar I of Bohemia emerged as the successor at the end of the 12th century, ruling from 1197. As a result of political agreements with both Roman Emperors (Philip of Swabia and Otto IV of Brunswick), he was able to renew the royal peerage for Bohemian kings, confirmed by Pope Innocent III in 1204. The new Roman Emperor and the King of Sicilia Friedrich II then confirmed the Přemyslids all competences and powers in the instrument – the famous Golden Bull of Sicily, issued in Basel on 26 September 1212. The instrument proclaimed the inheritance of the Bohemian royal dignity, renewed the scope of the Bohemian dominion in its original borders and stated conditions for Czech rulers' participation in Imperial Diets.

Pope Innocent III, who approved Přemysl's royal title, considered the Church to be the primary Christian institution and believed in the primacy of spiritual power over secular power, a view also enforced by his papal successors. Unlike in Western Europe, secular power, especially the king, was still dominant in Bohemia. The Bohemians did not consider it strange, as gifts from rulers and noblemen contributed to the growing prosperity of the Church.

The Prague Bishop Andrew therefore began to fight for the independence of the Church. However, this movement did not attract sufficient support in Bohemia, and Ottokar I agreed in 1221 and 1222 that the Church exercised ownership rights over land as well as tributaries at its townships. In addition, churchmen should fall under the authority of canonical (ecclesiastical) law, and could not be summoned before secular courts. In practice, the concordat (the agreement between the Church and the ruler or state) was never fully implemented.

In the 13th century the Church finished establishing its organisational structure in the Bohemian territory. The highest administrative unit was the bishopric, with subordinated Senior Deacon's Offices; the lower grade was formed by deaneries and basic parish units. In Latin, the Czech state was called Bohemia, however in Czech and other Slavic languages the territory was called "Čechy". The origin of the word "Czech" is unclear. The Czechs thus formed a unified tribe slowly developing into a medieval nation. However, the inhabitants of Moravia also spoke Czech.

=== The Mixed Era ===
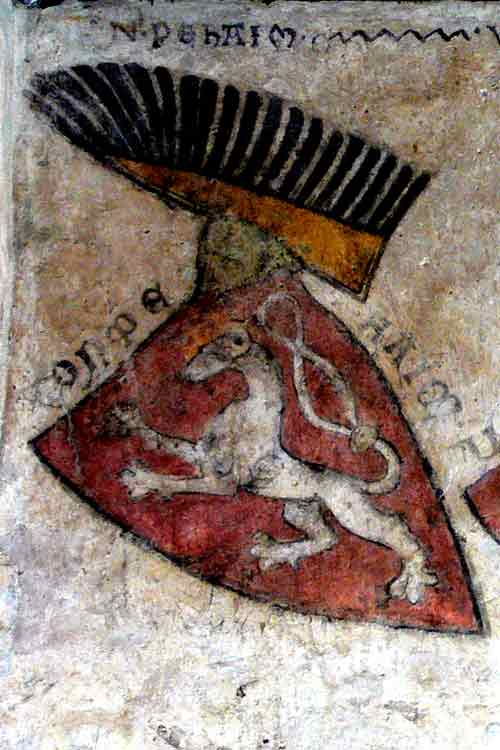
The oldest depiction of coat of arms of Bohemia, castle Gozzoburg in Krems

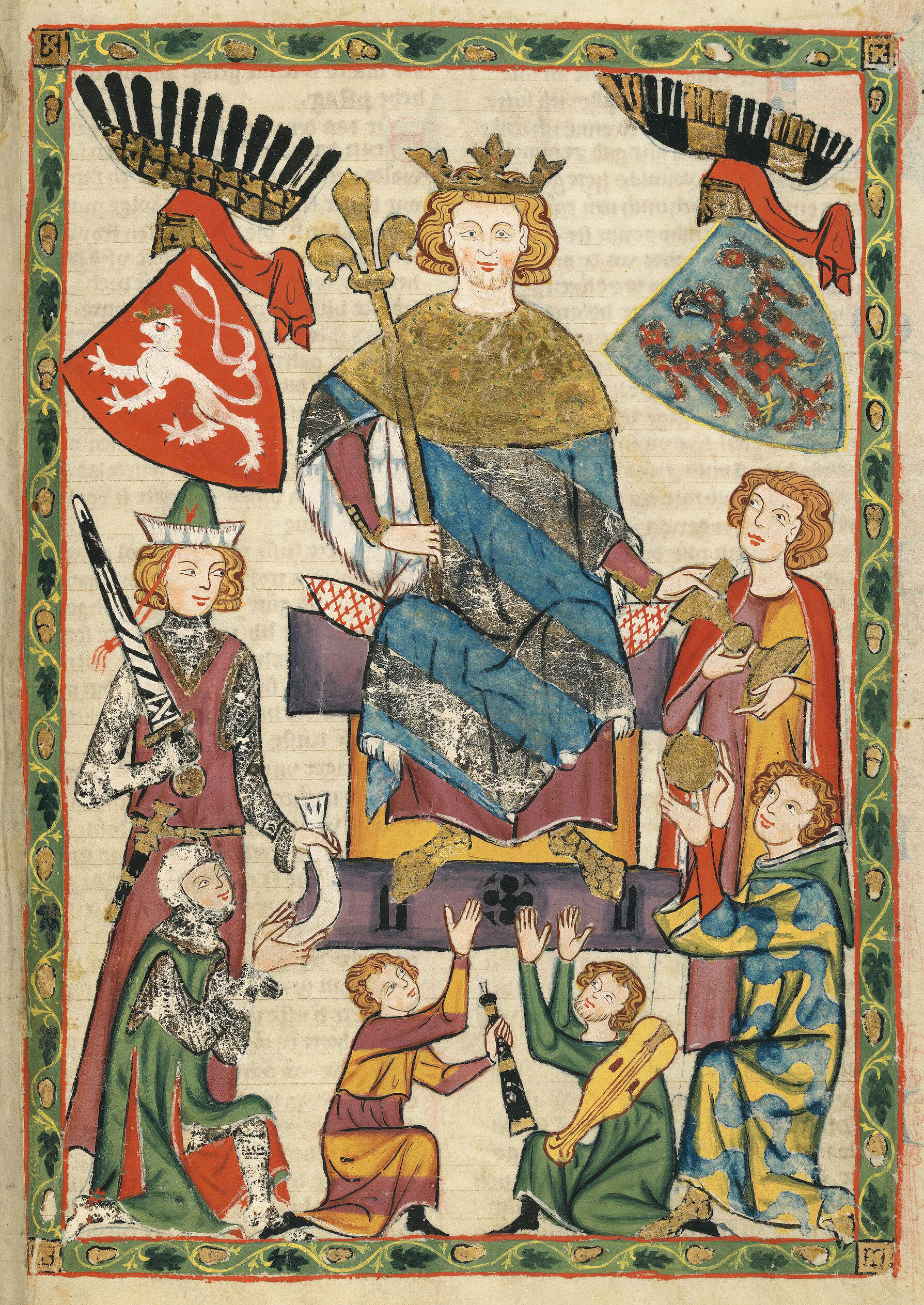
Wenceslaus II as depicted in the Codex Manesse

In 1273, German princes elected Count Rudolf of Habsburg as king, opposed by Ottokar II of Bohemia. Weakened, Ottokar was forced to resign from the Alpine countries, and war was declared against him. On 26 August 1278, in the Battle on the Marchfeld, Ottokar II was defeated and killed.

Rudolf of Habsburg attempted to use the death of the powerful ruler to weaken the Czech state. Circumstances were in his favour because Wenceslaus II, son of Ottokar II and his second wife Kunigunda of Halych and heir to the throne, was still a minor. Otto of Brandenburg was appointed his guardian and took over the administration of Bohemia, while Rudolf took control of Moravia. However, the Brandenburg garrisons treated the Bohemian territory as a conquered one and looted substantially, which contributed to rapid legal as well as economic decline, exacerbated by crop failure and consequent famine in 1281 and 1282.

In this difficult situation, Bohemian nobles attempted to calm the situation at negotiations in Prague in 1281, declaring a fight against criminality and the introduction of strict order in the country. This was the first meeting where important status was given to the representatives of the Old Town of Prague and the Church. Provincial assemblies then became important forums of noble politicians and it became customary to invite representatives of the Old Town and the Church to key meetings. Throughout the second half of the 13th and the 14th century the provincial court became increasingly important for the activities of noblemen in the Kingdom of Bohemia. The provincial court sat in Prague and ruled on matters of penal and proprietary law. It also kept official books, known as provincial books. Provincial books for Moravia were kept in Brno and Olomouc from 1348.

The king, Wenceslaus II, under the supervision of his guardian in Brandenburg, was not yet twelve when he returned to his homeland in 1283. Therefore, he submitted to the influence of his mother Kunigunda and her lover Záviš of Falkenstein (husband from 1285), a member of the Krumlov branch of Vítkovci.

However, Wenceslaus II later freed himself from their influence and grew in confidence. Wenceslaus II displayed the wealth of the Bohemian state and its rise to a Great Power at his ceremonial coronation in 1297. As the Governor of Bohemia could not expand his state southwards, where Habsburgs dominated, so he looked to the north and the east. In 1291 he conquered Kraków and in 1300 he gained the Polish royal crown in Gniezno. He strengthened his position after the death of Guta of Habsburg by marrying Elizabeth Richeza, the young princess of the House of Piast. In 1301, after the end of the Hungarian Arpad Dynasty, he accepted the offer of the Hungarian crown, which he obtained for his son Wenceslaus, who was crowned Wenceslaus III in Hungary.

At this point the Přemyslids were at the peak of their power. The strong international position of the Bohemian state in the 13th and at the beginning of the 14th century was closely related to the economic boom. However, without substantial reserves of precious minerals, the last Přemyslids did not achieve significant successes. The Bohemian provinces were famous for their silver, and a silver mining boom started just before the middle of the 13th century after the discovery of rich deposits near Jihlava. Silver mining brought many people to the area, and many temporary huts and pubs were built by and for the people who went there hoping to find their fortune. As late as 1270 Jihlava was awarded a building order by Ottokar II in order to expand the town according to its needs. A set of legal regulations, the first of such regulations for a mining town in Central Europe, were drawn up in relation to silver mining in the Jihlava and Havlíčkův Brod regions, and miners from German-speaking Saxony, Harz, and Tirol settled in Jihlava (German: Iglau) and Havlíčkův Brod (German: Deutsch-Brod). The inflow of skilled German labourers allowed the subsequent expansion of power for the Czech kings.

Another bigger silver boom began in the last decade of the 13th century, after the discovery of silver deposits at farms of an old Cistercian cloister in Sedlec. A new town, Kutná Hora, was quickly built nearby, the second biggest town in the country after Prague. The development of mining in Kutná Hora led to a coinage reform in 1300. An expert from Italy, Gozzo of Orvieto, contributed to the Mining Code at that time (Ius regale montanorum), among the most important documents of its kind in medieval Europe. As gold had a much higher price, the value of the Prague groschen significantly lagged behind gold coins from Florence and Venice and the Hungarian Körmöcbánya.

=== Downfall of the Přemyslid Dynasty ===
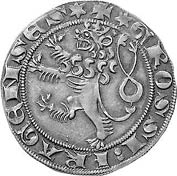
Prague groschen issued between 1300 and 1526 (revers)

The growing wealth and power of the Czech governor and return to power of the Přemyslids angered the Habsburgs. An attempt in 1304 by the Roman King Albert I to seize the Kutná Hora mines in a military expedition failed.

Wenceslaus II retained his position, which made the Czech governor the most important figure in the Holy Roman Empire behind the emperor. The King of Bohemia had been one of seven prince electors authorized to elect the Roman emperor since the middle of the 13th century. In addition, he held an honourable function as the main waiter at ceremonial occasions. However, the Přemyslid Dynasty was not universally successful; it suffered a diplomatic defeat in Hungary in 1304, which Wenceslaus-Ladislaus had to leave in secret, and soon after he relinquished the Hungarian crown.

When Wenceslaus II died of tuberculosis in 1305, the Bohemian state was still very powerful. However, a single assassination the following year changed the dynasty's fortunes completely. On 4 August 1306 an unknown assassin killed 16-year-old Wenceslaus III in Olomouc, meaning the male bloodline of the Přemyslid Dynasty died out.

The Duke Henry of Bohemia, husband of Anna of the Přemyslids, a sister of Wenceslaus III, expressed an interest in the vacant throne. However, after a brief period of uncertainty, Rudolf of Habsburg, who supported his claims by marrying the widow queen Elizabeth Richeza, won the struggle for the Czech crown. Rudolf himself died unexpectedly in 1307 and the crown passed to Henry of Bohemia. Elizabeth Richeza struck up a relationship with Jindrich of Lipá, the most powerful Czech lord, who became a dominant political figure during Henry's reign.

Henry's weak reign did not bring prosperity to Bohemia, but a solution to the threat of social collapse was found by abbots Konrad of Zbraslav and Heidenreich of Sedlec, representatives of important Cistercian cloisters. Supported by some Czech noblemen, they contacted the Roman Emperor Henry VII of Luxemburg to suggest a marriage of his son John and the 18-year-old Elisabeth of the Přemyslids, still unmarried daughter of Wenceslaus II. However, John had to take control of Bohemia by force.

=== The era of John of Luxemburg ===
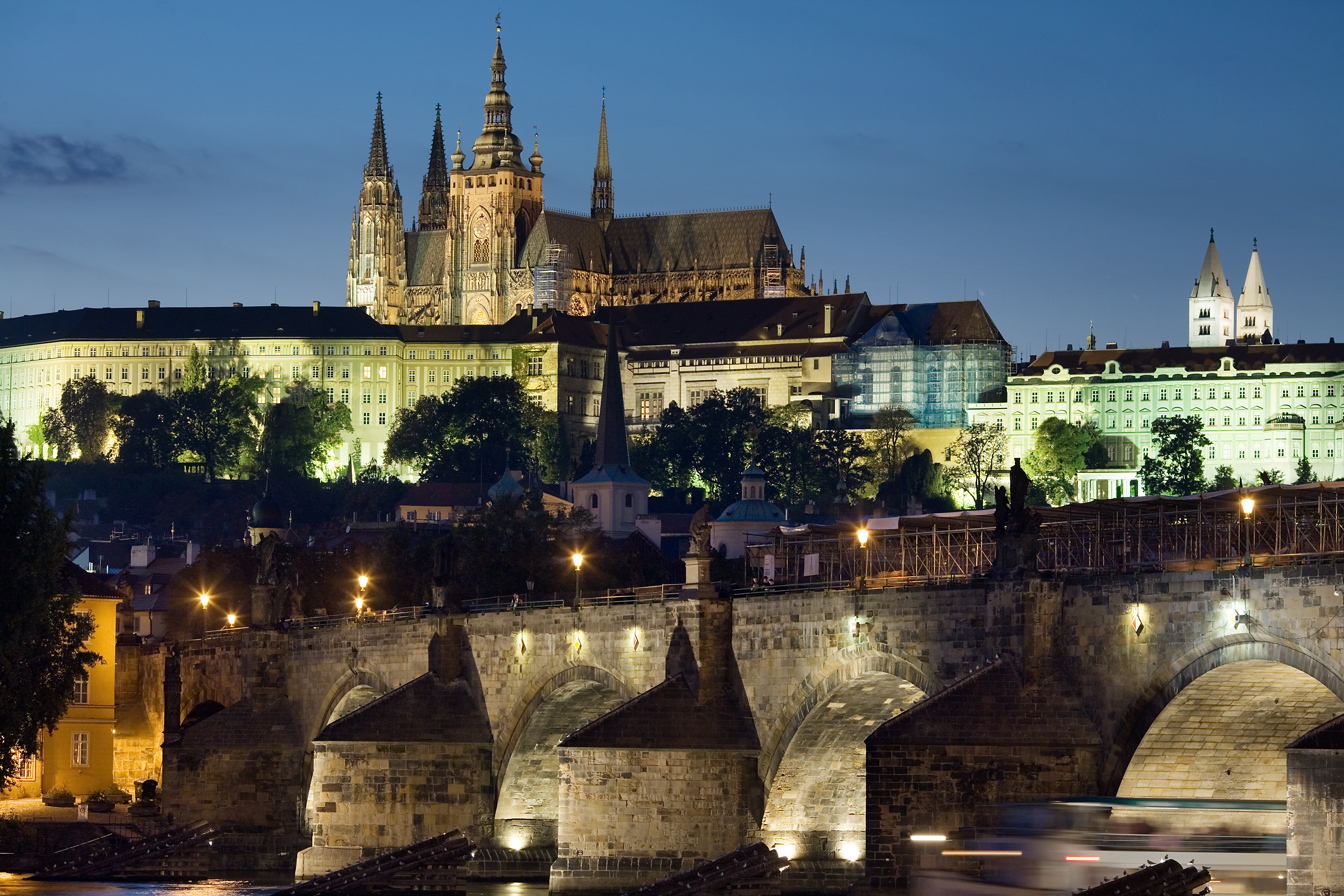
Prague Castle, the ancient seat of Bohemian dukes and kings, Roman kings and emperors, and after 1918 the office of the Czechoslovak and Czech presidents

On 7 February 1311 the coronation of John of Luxembourg and Elisabeth of Přemyslids took place in the Roman basilica of St. Vitus Cathedral, ending with a feast. However, the beginning of John's reign met with numerous complications.

The powerful Bohemian lords were concerned about the influence of foreign advisers sent to John, an inexperienced leader in an unknown country, by his father Henry VII. John therefore promised that he would appoint only Bohemian noblemen to provincial offices, use the military only to defend the kingdom and not campaign with it abroad, reduce tax collection, and expand inheritance rights for noblemen. As long as Henry VII, the Emperor until 1312, was alive, the Bohemian lords did not challenge John's authority very much. However, after Henry died during an Italian expedition in 1313, pressure from Bohemian lords to dismiss the foreign advisers began to grow, as described in the Chronicle of Dalimil. The Bohemian lords soon broke into open rebellion against John, and at Easter 1318 the new Roman King Louis IV of Bavaria, of the Wittelsbach Dynasty, had to suppress the uprising. The following year John's marriage underwent a deep crisis, which culminated with Elisabeth's imprisonment (c.1265–1335).

However, after this period John, charismatic and a favourite of the European royal court, significantly increased Bohemia's prestige internationally and greatly extended its territory. From 1319 to 1329 he regained control of Upper Lusatia for the Czech kingdom, followed by the majority of Silesian princedoms from 1327 to 1342, thus laying the foundations of the co-states of the Czech Crown which would be constitutionally governed by his son Charles. He gained the strategically important Cheb region in 1322 to assist Louis IV in the Battle of Mühldorf, where Frederick of Habsburg was defeated.

A skillful diplomat, John was able to benefit from a disadvantageous situation. For many years, Louis IV had an antagonistic relationship with the papal court seated in Avignon. The new pope, Clement VI, the former governor of John's first-born son Charles, saw Charles as a possible alternative to Louis as Roman King. On 11 July 1346 Charles of Luxembourg was elected Roman king by the votes of five electors in Rhens. Several weeks later, on 26 August 1346, King John, blind for several years by that time, died at the Battle of Crécy, where he was helping the French king Philip VI in the Hundred Years' War against England. This death brought to an end the life of the man seen by the late Middle Ages Europe as the embodiment of knightly ideals.

== Social structure ==
In the middle of the 13th century, Czech society reflected the typical two-tier composition.

The upper tier consisted of members of the Catholic Church (clergy) and the nobility. Together with the king, this small group administered the state and dominion, defended the land against enemies, spread the Christian faith, and governed the lives of the rest of the country.

The largest component of the population was working people, involved in physical labour and trafficking, a group made up of farmers (about 80% of the population) and urban residents (about 15% of the population). This section of the population paid taxes to provide a higher standard of living for the other two.

Not everyone was accepted as part of the social structure; whoever did not belong to one of the three main groups was viewed with suspicion and disgust and lived on the margins of society. This group included wanderers, jugglers, actors, beggars, prostitutes, criminals, and others.

=== Czech and Moravian nobility ===
The end of the 12th and 13th century in the Czech lands was a period of revolutionary change and a new era for landscape and society. Owners of land or property formed the nobility, historically divided into higher nobility (lords) and lower.

Since the demise of the 12th century records, the Czech aristocracy was part of the chivalric culture flourishing in Western Europe, which had been introduced to the Czech lands through neighbouring German regions. In the High Middle Ages, it was not possible to become a knight, even through being part of a royal bloodline; knighthood had to be earned through actions, especially courage, chivalry and bravery in battle. Only then would the ruler have his representative knighted. The highest value was placed on chivalry, then faithfulness to God, Christianity and the Church.

Foreign colonists brought many new products to the Czech lands. The Western European three-field system of agriculture was gradually introduced. During the winter farmers sowed winter wheat in the first field and spring crops in the second, while the third field was left fallow as pasture for grazing animals. The fields were alternated in a three-year cycle. However, grain yield was still low and the ratio fluctuated between 1:3 and 1:8. Barley and wheat, legumes, peas and various vegetables were the most common crops. In terms of livestock, cattle, pigs, goats and sheep were most common. Despite many advances, such agriculture did not fully prevent the risk of crop failure and resulting famine, which would remain an issue for Czechs into the 18th century, with the spread of potato cultivation.

=== Lords and serfs ===
Migration into the Czech lands brought not only domestic and technical innovations, but also legal reforms.

In order to establish a village, the founder (known as lokator) would first choose a convenient place, and then receive consent from the landowner. He then allocated plots for future courts and surface grounds. This was followed by the construction of houses and the conversion of uncultivated land into fields. Colonists became the subjects of the ruler on whose land the new village was founded, who would be paid tax of a fixed sum, usually twice a year. In addition, peasants were serfs, bound to the feudal courts by what was termed the robota. However, they were able to keep possession of their lands and pass them on to their children. This type of relationship between lords and vassals became commonplace in the Czech lands.

Until the High Middle Ages there was no craft or merchant centre in Bohemia with a clear legal definition. However, in the 13th century the Czech lands began to develop a network of cities, emerging from some of the older craft markets and administrative centres as well as newly planned towns in undeveloped areas. Urban colonization was mainly linked to the activities of German immigrants, in Silesia as well as Bohemia and Moravia. Traders were usually more prosperous than craftsmen, especially if they were involved in the trade of luxury goods.

Significant Czech and Moravian cities were established by the monarch, who gave oral or written agreement to their founding and awarded them the appropriate rights. These were known as royal cities. Over time monarchs allocated rights to several cities whose tax went to queens and their courts, known as dowry towns. Mining was also under the King's control and became important after the discovery of rich deposits of silver. By 1300 there were about 40 royal cities in the Czech lands.

== Gothic architecture in Bohemia ==
During the reign of the last Přemyslids, especially in the era of Wenceslaus I, a new artistic style began to arrive in the provinces of Bohemia, which had originated in France and would become known as Gothic. Gothic architecture intended to illustrate the Christian desire for achieving the salvation of soul in the eternal kingdom of God, as the lines of Gothic cathedrals intentionally lead towards heaven and express the effort to overcome the material burden of the terrestrial world. Gothic symbols, including fashion, were characterized by elongating the proportions and emphasis on vertical lines.

At first, Czech society did not have sufficient resources to build extensive Gothic cathedrals like those in the seats of bishoprics and archbishoprics in Western Europe. The introduction of basic elements of Gothic construction, such as a high-crowned arch, was gradual. The monastery in Prague is considered to be the most unified manifestation of Gothic architecture in Bohemia. Use of Gothic architecture in churches was an indication of deepening religiosity, as exemplified by Agnes of Bohemia, the founder of the order of the Knights of the Cross with the Red Star, and Zdislava Berka, a younger noblewoman working in Northern Bohemia, who cared for the ill and suffering.

In secular society, the rise of the Gothic style was associated with court knight culture, exemplified in castles built by both royals (including Zvikov Castle and Bezděz Castle) and nobles (such as Michalovice Castle). Construction of stone houses in towns and fortifications was also according to the rules of Gothic construction. Gothic culture came to Bohemia from Germany.

== Resources ==
- MUNDY, John Hine. Evropa vrcholného středověku 1150–1300. Prague: Vyšehrad, 2008. 446 s. ISBN 978-80-7021-927-0
- Klápště, Jan. Proměna českých zemí ve středověku. Prague 2005
- Fridrich, Jan. Středopaleolitické osídlení Čech. Prague 1982
- NOVOTNÝ, Václav. České dějiny I./II. Od Břetislava I. do Přemysla I. Prague: Jan Laichter, 1913. 1214 s.
- LAMBERT, Malcolm D. Středověká hereze. Prague: Argo, 2000. 598 s. ISBN 80-7203-291-7.
- DRŠKA, Václav; PICKOVÁ, Dana. Dějiny středověké Evropy. Prague: Aleš Skřivan ml., 2004. 364 s. ISBN 80-86493-11-3.
- ŽEMLIČKA, Josef. Čechy v době knížecí 1034–1198. Prague: Nakladatelství Lidové noviny, 2007. 712 s. ISBN 978-80-7106-905-8
- Vaníček Vratislav, Velké dějiny Zemí koruny českéI., II. Prague 1999
