= Kingdom of Bohemia =

Monarchy in Central Europe (1198–1918)

Coordinates: 50°05′15″N 14°25′17″E

Kingdom of Bohemia: České království (Czech); Königreich Böhmen (German); Regnum Bohemiae (Latin)
- 1198–1918
- Top: Medieval royal banner Bottom: Late state flag and royal standard Royal coat of arms of Bohemia as a possession of Austria-Hungary (1890)

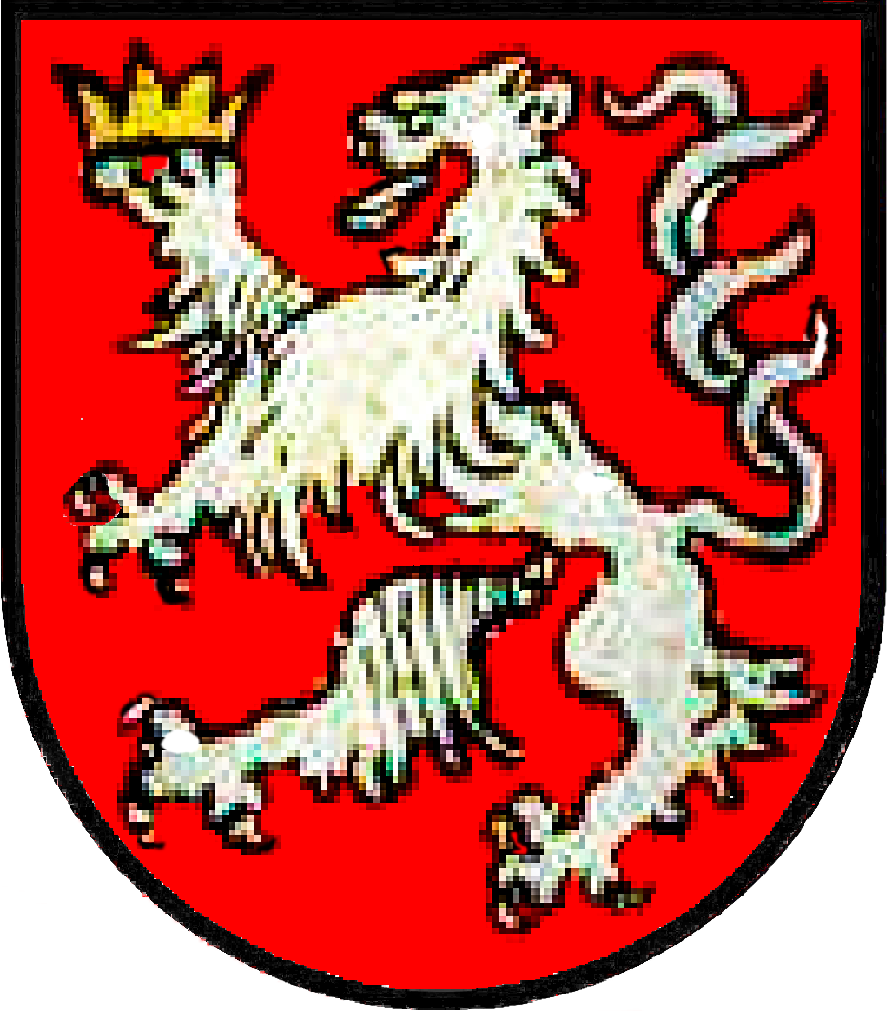
- Medieval, royal shield of the King of Bohemia as imperial Elector and Arch-Cupbearer

- The Kingdom of Bohemia (dark red) with other Bohemian Crown lands (light red) within the Holy Roman Empire (1618)

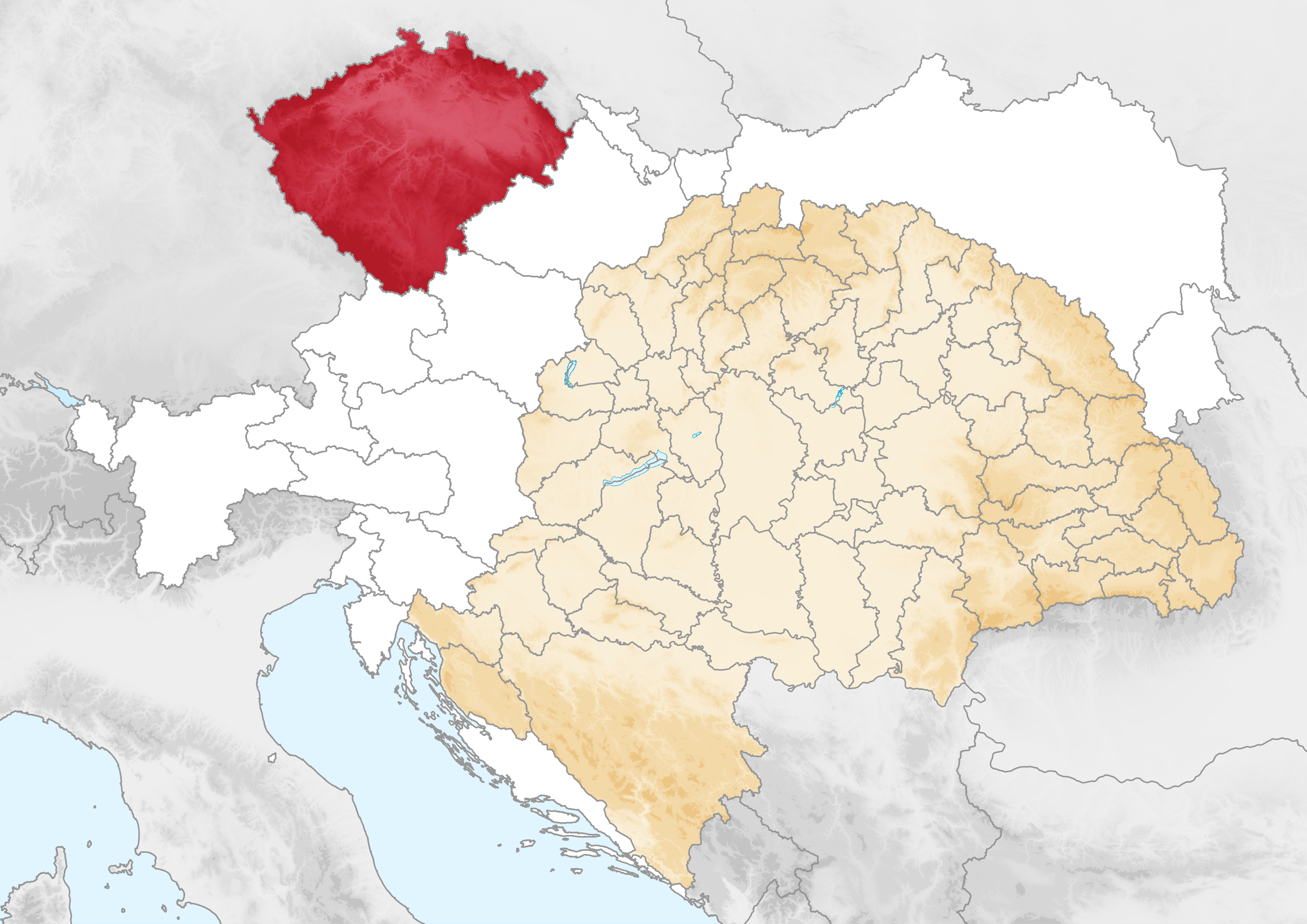
- The Kingdom of Bohemia (red) within Austria-Hungary (1914)
- Status: State of the Holy Roman Empire (1198–1806); Crown land of the Bohemian Crown (1348–1918); Imperial elector (1356–1806); Crown land of the Habsburg monarchy (1526–1804), of the Austrian Empire (1804–1867), and Cisleithania (1867–1918)
- Capital and largest city: Prague
- Common languages: Czech; German; Latin
- Religion: Latin Catholicism (official); Hussitism, later Bohemian Reformed (Utraquism, Brethren); Lutheranism; Judaism (Jews); Calvinism; Waldensianism; Neo-Adamitism
- Government: Feudal monarchy Absolute monarchy Parliamentary monarchy
- King
  - 1198–1230: Ottokar I (first)
  - 1916–1918: Charles III (last)
- History
  - Kingdom established: 1198
  - Hereditary royal title confirmed: 26 September 1212
  - Inauguration of the Luxembourg dynasty: December 1310
  - Became main part of the Crown of Bohemia: 7 April 1348
  - King confirmed Elector: 25 December 1356
  - King Ferdinand I, Holy Roman Emperor: 16 December 1526
  - Renewed Land Ordinance imposed hereditary Habsburg succession to throne: 10 May 1627
  - Crown of Bohemia de facto dissolved: 1 May 1749
  - Dissolution of Austria-Hungary: 31 October 1918

Population
  - Around 1400: Approximately 2 million
- Currency: Denarius; Bracteate; Groschen; Thaler; Kreutzer; Florin; Crown
Preceded by
Duchy of Bohemia
Duchy of Silesia
Duchy of Jawor
Duchy of Brzeg
Egerland
Succeeded by
First Czechoslovak Republic
- Today part of: Czech Republic; Germany; Poland; Slovakia

The Kingdom of Bohemia (Czech: České království), (Note: In Czech, české means both 'Bohemian' and 'Czech'. German: Königreich Böhmen; Latin: Regnum Bohemiae) sometimes referenced in English literature as the Czech Kingdom, was a medieval and early modern monarchy in Central Europe. It was the predecessor state of the modern Czech Republic.

The Kingdom of Bohemia was an Imperial State in the Holy Roman Empire. The Bohemian king was a prince-elector of the empire. The kings of Bohemia, besides the region of Bohemia itself, also ruled other lands belonging to the Bohemian Crown, which at various times included Moravia, Silesia, Lusatia, and parts of Saxony, Brandenburg, and Bavaria.

The kingdom was established by the Přemyslid dynasty in the 12th century from the Duchy of Bohemia. It was later ruled by the House of Luxembourg, the Jagiellonian dynasty, and from 1526 the House of Habsburg and its successor, the House of Habsburg-Lorraine. Numerous kings of Bohemia were also elected Holy Roman Emperors, and the capital, Prague, was the imperial seat in the late 14th century, and again at the end of the 16th and the beginning of the 17th centuries.

Shortly before the dissolution of the Holy Roman Empire in 1806, the kingdom became part of the newly proclaimed Habsburg Austrian Empire, and subsequently the Austro-Hungarian Empire from 1867. Bohemia retained its name and formal status as a separate Kingdom of Bohemia until 1918, known as a crown land within the Austro-Hungarian Empire, and its capital Prague was one of the empire's leading cities. The Czech language (called the Bohemian language in English usage until the 19th century) was the main language of the Diet and the nobility until 1627 (after the Bohemian Revolt was suppressed). German was then formally made equal with Czech and eventually prevailed as the language of the Diet until the Czech National Revival in the 19th century. German was also widely used as the language of administration in many towns after the Germans immigrated and populated some areas of the country in the 13th century. The royal court used the Czech, Latin, and German languages, depending on the ruler and period.

Following the defeat of the Central Powers in World War I, both the Kingdom and Empire were dissolved. Bohemia became the core part of the newly formed Czechoslovak Republic.

== History ==
=== 13th century (growth) ===
Although some former rulers of Bohemia had enjoyed a non-hereditary royal title during the 11th and 12th centuries (Vratislaus II, Vladislaus II), the kingdom was formally established (by elevating Duchy of Bohemia) in 1198 by Přemysl Ottokar I, who had his status acknowledged by Philip of Swabia, elected King of the Romans, in return for his support against the rival Emperor Otto IV. In 1204 Ottokar's royal status was accepted by Otto IV as well as by Pope Innocent III. It was officially recognized in 1212 by the Golden Bull of Sicily issued by Emperor Frederick II, elevating the Duchy of Bohemia to Kingdom status and proclaiming its independence which was also later bolstered by future king of Bohemia and emperor Charles IV, with his golden bull in 1356.

Under these terms, the Czech king was to be exempt from all future obligations to the Holy Roman Empire except for participation in the imperial councils. The imperial prerogative to ratify each Bohemian ruler and to appoint the bishop of Prague was revoked. The king's successor was his son Wenceslaus I, from his second marriage.

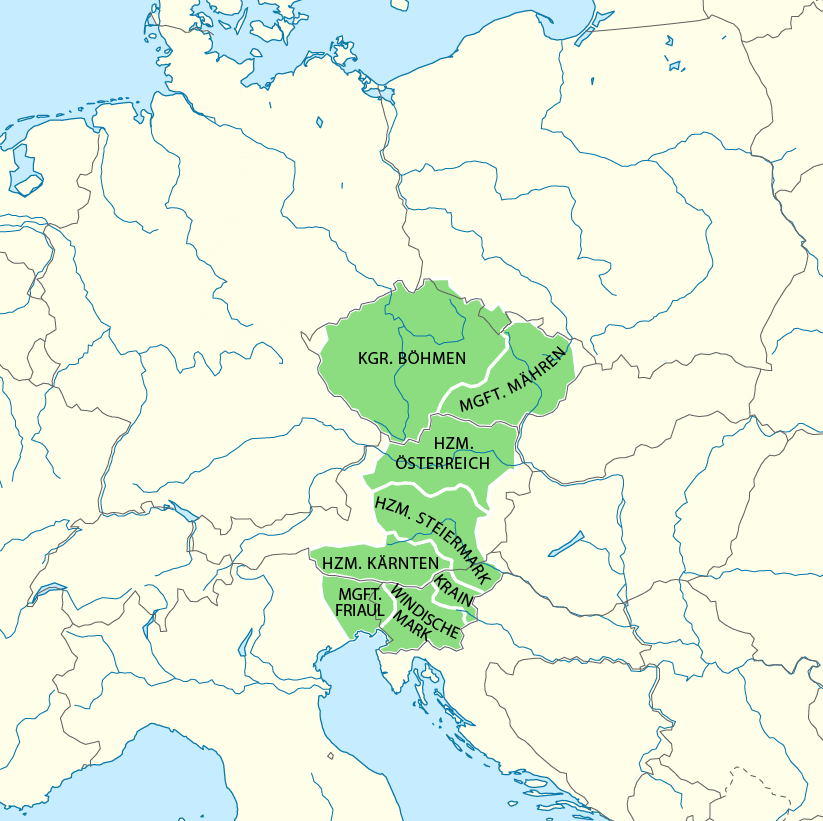
Territories ruled by Ottokar II of Bohemia in 1273

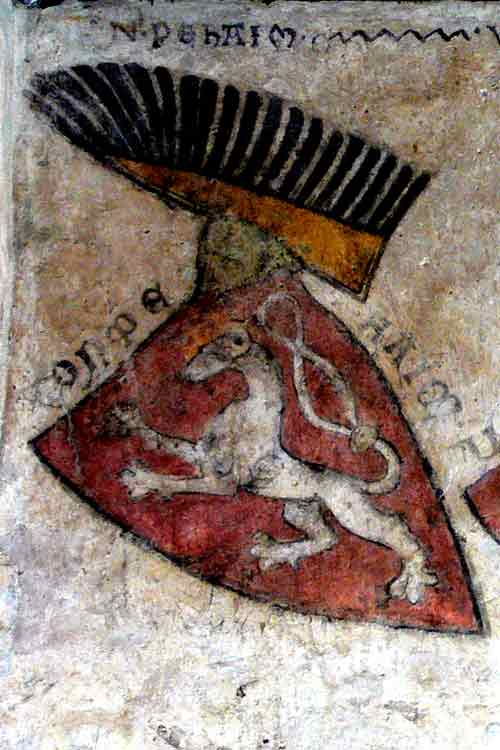
The oldest depiction of coat of arms of Bohemia, castle Gozzoburg in Krems (13th century)

Wenceslaus I's sister Agnes, later canonized, refused to marry the Holy Roman Emperor and instead devoted her life to spiritual works. Corresponding with the Pope, she established the Knights of the Cross with the Red Star in 1233, the first military order in the Kingdom of Bohemia. Four other military orders were present in Bohemia: the Order of St. John of Jerusalem from c. 1160; the Order of Saint Lazarus from the late 12th century; the Teutonic Order from c. 1200–1421; and the Knights Templar from 1232 to 1312.

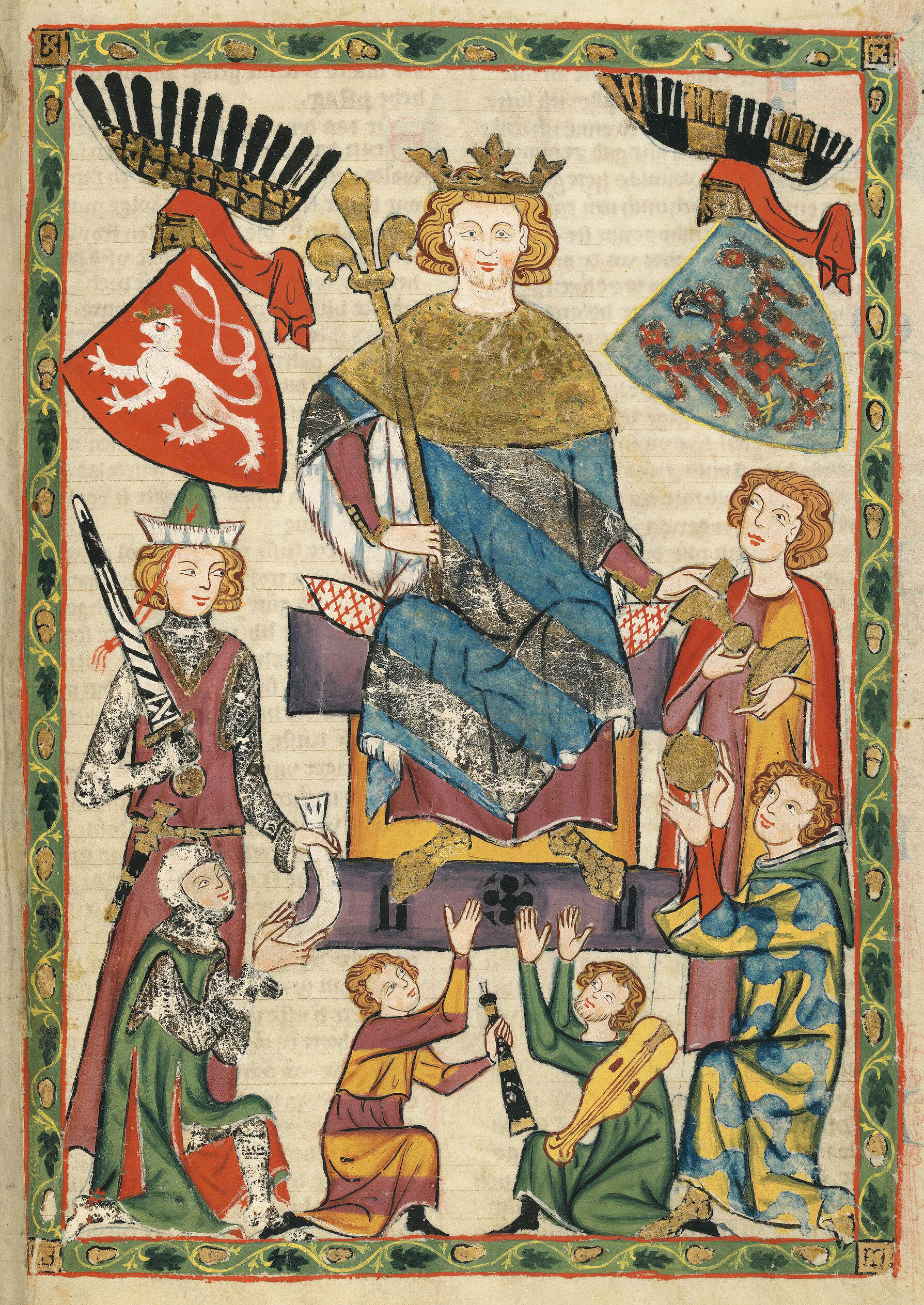
Wenceslaus II as depicted in the Codex Manesse

The 13th century was the most dynamic period of the Přemyslid reign over Bohemia. German Emperor Frederick II's preoccupation with Mediterranean affairs and the dynastic struggles known as the Great Interregnum (1254–73) weakened imperial authority in Central Europe, thus providing opportunities for Přemyslid assertiveness. At the same time, the Mongol invasions (1220–42) absorbed the attention of Bohemia's eastern neighbors, Hungary and Poland.

Přemysl Ottokar II (1253–78) married a German princess, Margaret of Babenberg, and became duke of Austria. He thereby acquired Upper Austria, Lower Austria, and part of Styria. He conquered the rest of Styria, most of Carinthia, and parts of Carniola. He was called "the king of iron and gold" (iron because of his conquests, gold because of his wealth). He campaigned as far as Prussia, where he defeated the pagan natives and in 1256, founded a city he named Královec in Czech, which later became Königsberg (now Kaliningrad).

In 1260, Ottokar defeated Béla IV, king of Hungary in the Battle of Kressenbrunn near the Morava river, where more than 200,000 men clashed. He ruled an area from Austria to the Adriatic Sea. From 1273, however, Habsburg king Rudolf began to reassert imperial authority, checking Ottokar's power. He also had problems with rebellious nobility in Bohemia. All of Ottokar's German possessions were lost in 1276, and in 1278 he was abandoned by part of the Czech nobility and died in the Battle on the Marchfeld against Rudolf.

Ottokar was succeeded by his son King Wenceslaus II, who was crowned King of Poland in 1300. Wenceslaus II's son Wenceslaus III was crowned King of Hungary a year later. At this time, the Kings of Bohemia ruled from Hungary to the Baltic Sea.

The 13th century was also a period of large-scale German immigration, during the Ostsiedlung, often encouraged by the Přemyslid kings. The Germans populated towns and mining districts on the Bohemian periphery and in some cases formed German colonies in the interior of the Czech lands. Stříbro, Kutná Hora, Německý Brod (present-day Havlíčkův Brod), and Jihlava were important German settlements. The Germans brought their own code of law – the ius teutonicum – which formed the basis of the later commercial law of Bohemia and Moravia. Marriages between Czech nobles and Germans soon became commonplace.

=== 14th century ("Golden Age") ===
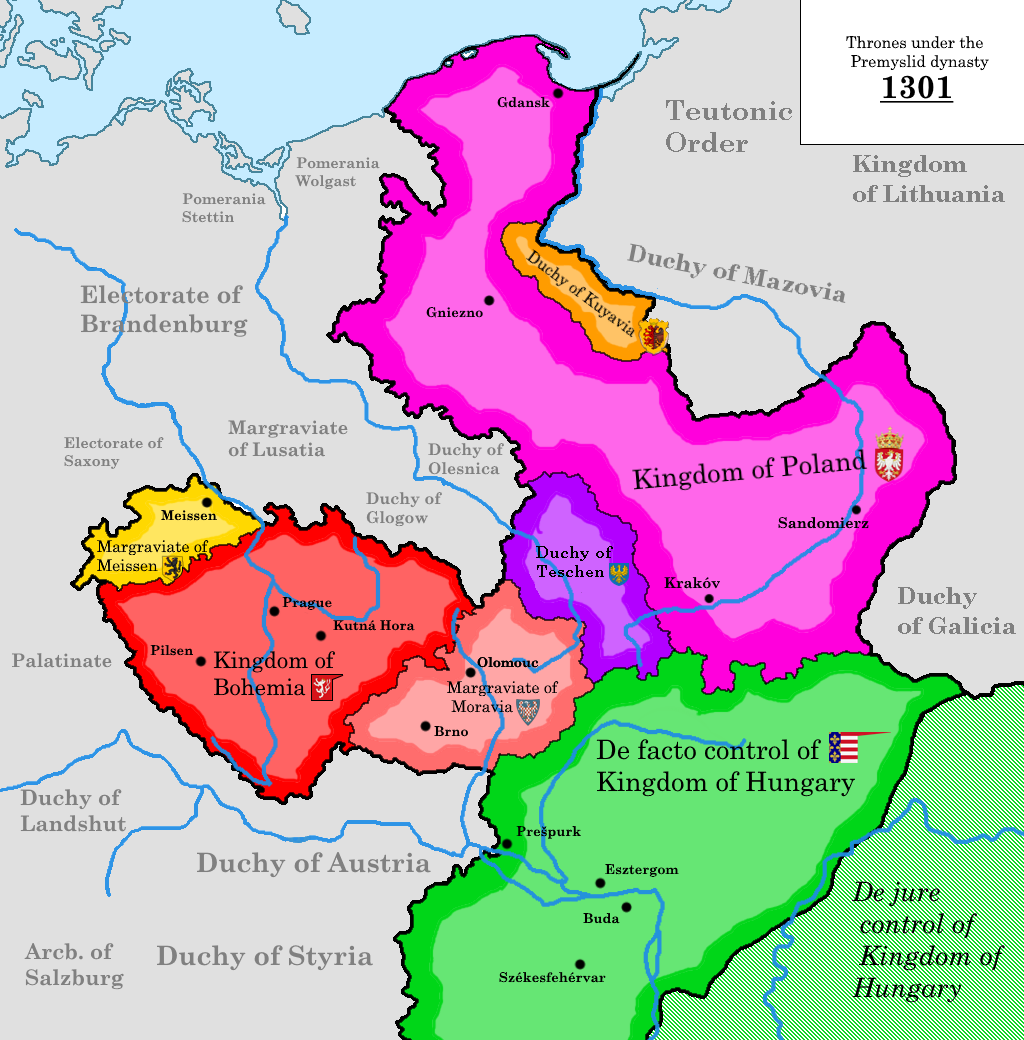
Territories under the control of the Přemyslid dynasty around 1301

Prague groschen issued between 1300 and 1547
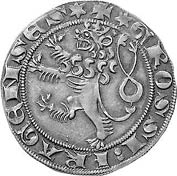
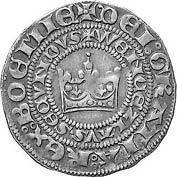

The 14th century – particularly the reign of Charles IV (1342–1378) – is considered the Golden Age of Czech history. In 1306, the Přemyslid line died out and, after a series of dynastic wars, John, Count of Luxembourg, was elected Bohemian king. He married Elisabeth, the daughter of Wenceslaus II. He was succeeded as king in 1346 by his son, Charles IV, the second king from the House of Luxembourg. Charles was raised at the French court and was cosmopolitan in attitude.

Charles IV strengthened the power and prestige of the Bohemian kingdom. In 1344 he elevated the bishopric of Prague, making it an archbishopric and freeing it from the jurisdiction of Mainz, and the archbishop was given the right to crown Bohemian kings. Charles curbed the Bohemian, Moravian, and Silesian nobility, and rationalized the provincial administration of Bohemia and Moravia. He created the Crown of Bohemia, incorporating Moravia, Silesia and Lusatia.

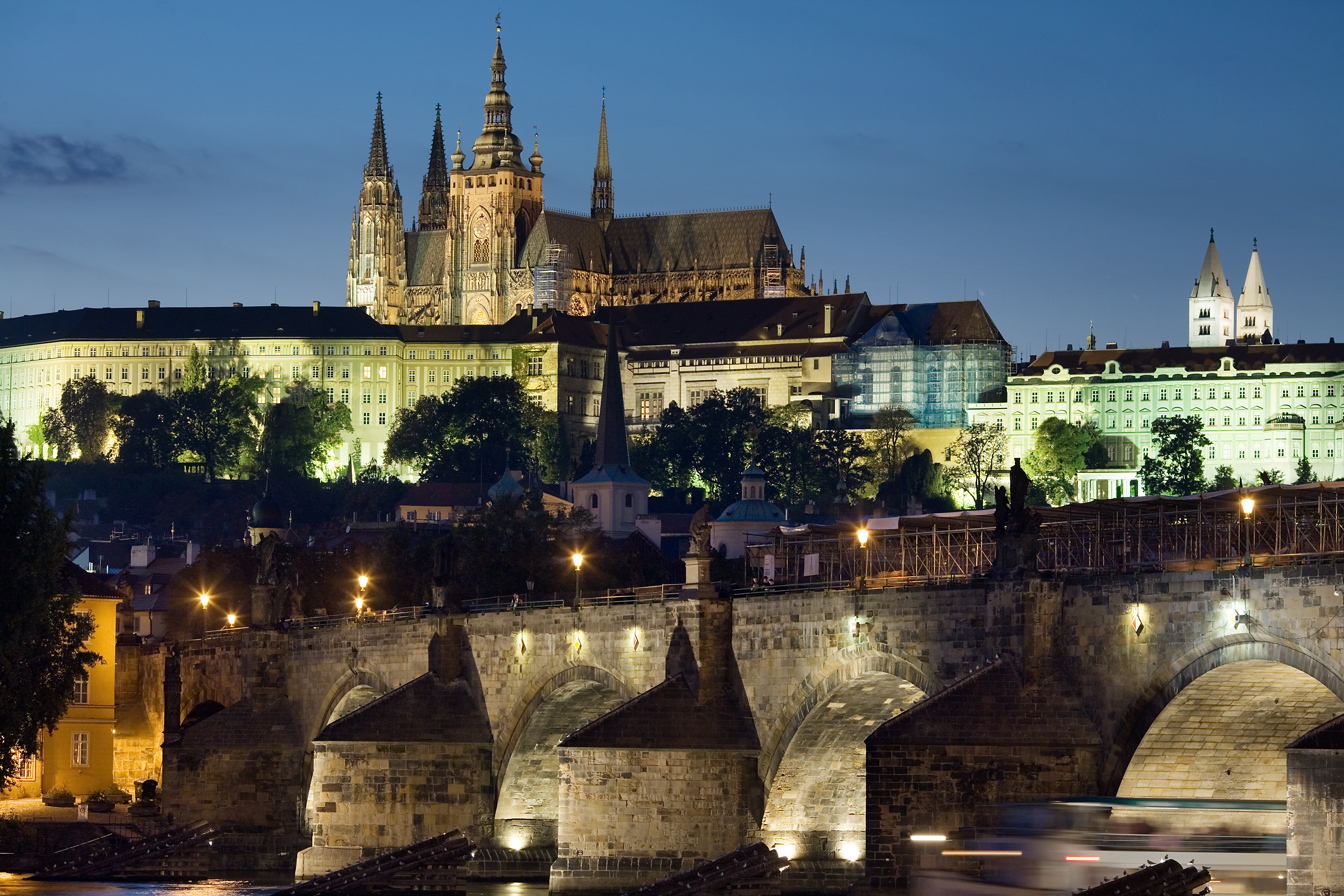
Prague Castle, the ancient seat of Bohemian dukes and kings, Roman kings and emperors, and after 1918 the office of the Czechoslovak and Czech presidents

In 1355 Charles was crowned Holy Roman Emperor. The next year he issued the Golden Bull of 1356, defining and codifying the process of election to the Imperial throne, with the Bohemian king among the seven electors. Issuance of the Golden Bull together with the ensuing acquisition of the Brandenburg Electorate gave the Luxemburgs two votes in the electoral college. Charles also made Prague into an Imperial capital.

Extensive building projects undertaken by the king included the founding of the New Town southeast of the old city. The royal castle, Hradčany, was rebuilt. Of particular significance was the founding of Charles University in Prague in 1348. Charles intended to make Prague into an international center of learning, and the university was divided into Czech, Polish, Saxon, and Bavarian "nations", each with one controlling vote. Charles University, however, would become the nucleus of intense Czech particularism.

Charles died in 1378, and the Bohemian crown went to his son, Wenceslas IV. He had also been elected King of the Romans in 1376, in the first election since his father's Golden Bull. He was deposed from the Imperial throne in 1400, however, having never been crowned Emperor. His half-brother, Sigismund, was eventually crowned Emperor in Rome in 1433, ruling until 1437, and he was the last male member of the House of Luxemburg.

=== 15th century (Hussite movement) ===
The Hussite movement (1402–1485) was primarily a religious, as well as national, manifestation. As a religious reform movement (the so-called Bohemian Reformation), it represented a challenge to papal authority and an assertion of national autonomy in ecclesiastical affairs. The Hussites defeated four crusades from the Holy Roman Empire, and the movement is viewed by many as a part of the (worldwide) Protestant Reformation. Because many of warriors of the crusades were Germans, although many were also Hungarians and Catholic Czechs, the Hussite movement is seen as a Czech national movement. In modern times it acquired anti-imperial and anti-German associations and has sometimes been identified as a manifestation of a long-term ethnic Czech–German conflict.

Hussitism began during the long reign of Wenceslaus IV (1378–1419), a period of papal schism and concomitant anarchy in the Holy Roman Empire. It was precipitated by a controversy at Charles University in Prague. In 1403 Jan Hus became rector of the university. A reformist preacher, Hus espoused the anti-papal and anti-hierarchical teachings of John Wycliffe of England, often referred to as the "Morning Star of the Reformation". Hus' teaching was distinguished by its rejection of what he saw as the wealth, corruption, and hierarchical tendencies of the Catholic Church. He advocated the Wycliffe doctrine of clerical purity and poverty, and insisted on the laity receiving communion under both kinds, bread and wine. (The Catholic Church in practice reserved the cup, or wine, for the clergy.) The more moderate followers of Hus, the Utraquists, took their name from the Latin sub utraque specie, meaning "under each kind". The Taborites, a more radical sect, soon formed, taking their name from the town of Tábor, their stronghold in southern Bohemia. They rejected church doctrine and upheld the Bible as the sole authority in all matters of belief.

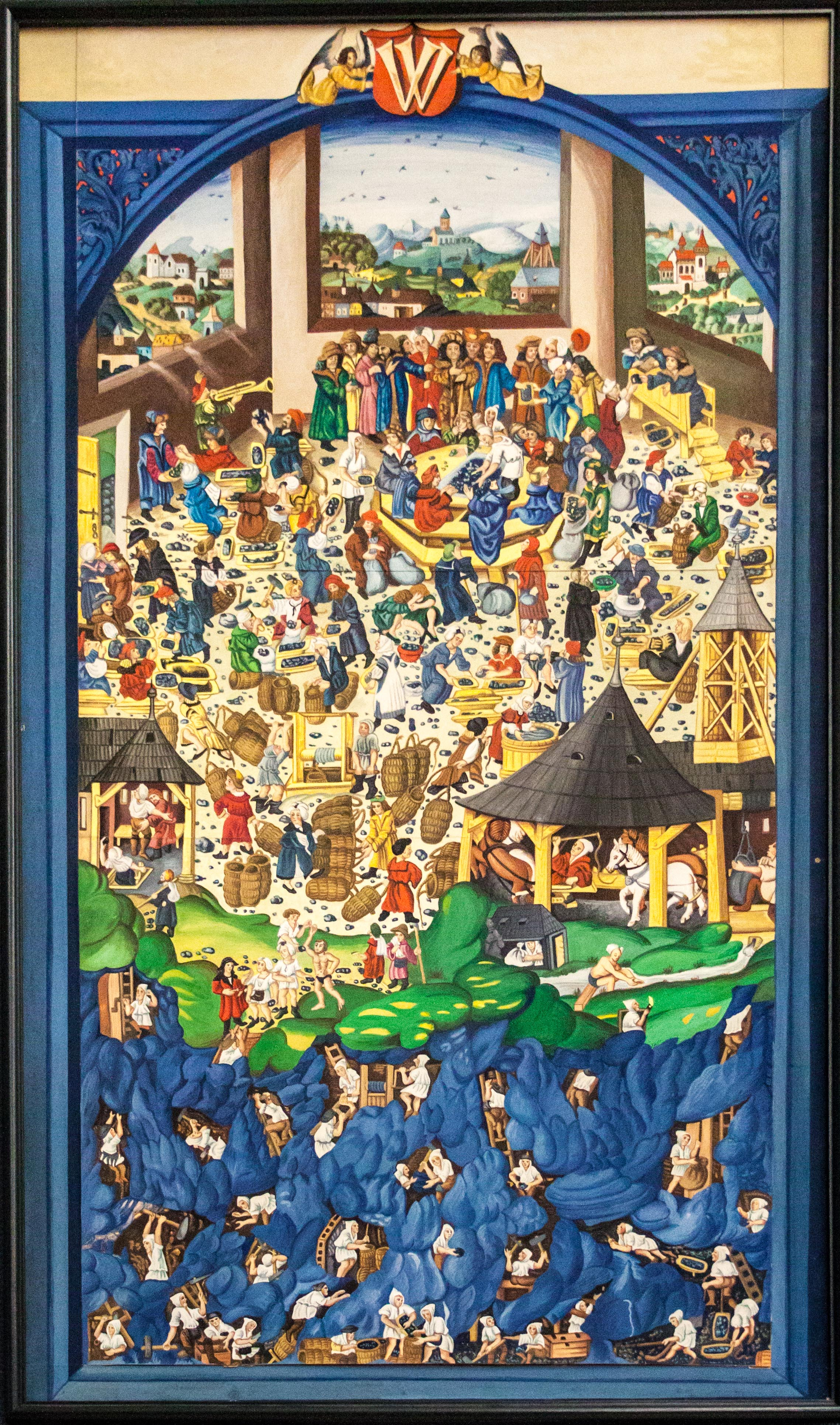
Kutná Hora, a medieval silver-mining centre, was once the second most important town of the kingdom.

Soon after Hus assumed office, German professors of theology demanded the condemnation of Wycliffe's writings. Hus protested, receiving the support of the Czech element at the university. Having only one vote in policy decisions against three for the Germans, the Czechs were outvoted, and the orthodox position was maintained. In subsequent years, the Czechs demanded a revision of the university charter, granting more adequate representation to the native Czech faculty. The university controversy was intensified by the vacillating position of the Bohemian king Wenceslas. His favoring of Germans in appointments to councillor and other administrative positions had aroused the nationalist sentiments of the Czech nobility and rallied them to Hus' defense. The German faculties had the support of Zbyněk Zajíc, Archbishop of Prague, and the German clergy. For political reasons, Wenceslas switched his support from the Germans to Hus and allied with the reformers. On 18 January 1409, Wenceslas issued the Decree of Kutná Hora: (as was the case at other major universities in Europe) the Czechs would have three votes; the others, a single vote. In consequence, German faculty and students left Charles University en masse in the thousands, and many ended up founding the University of Leipzig.

Hus' victory was short-lived. He preached against the sale of indulgences, which lost him the support of the king, who had received a percentage of such sales. In 1412 Hus and his followers were suspended from the university and expelled from Prague. For two years the reformers served as itinerant preachers throughout Bohemia. In 1414, Hus was summoned to the Council of Constance to defend his views. Imprisoned when he arrived, he was allowed no legal advocate for his defense; the council condemned him as a heretic and relinquished him to an imperial secular court, which decreed he be burned at the stake in 1415.

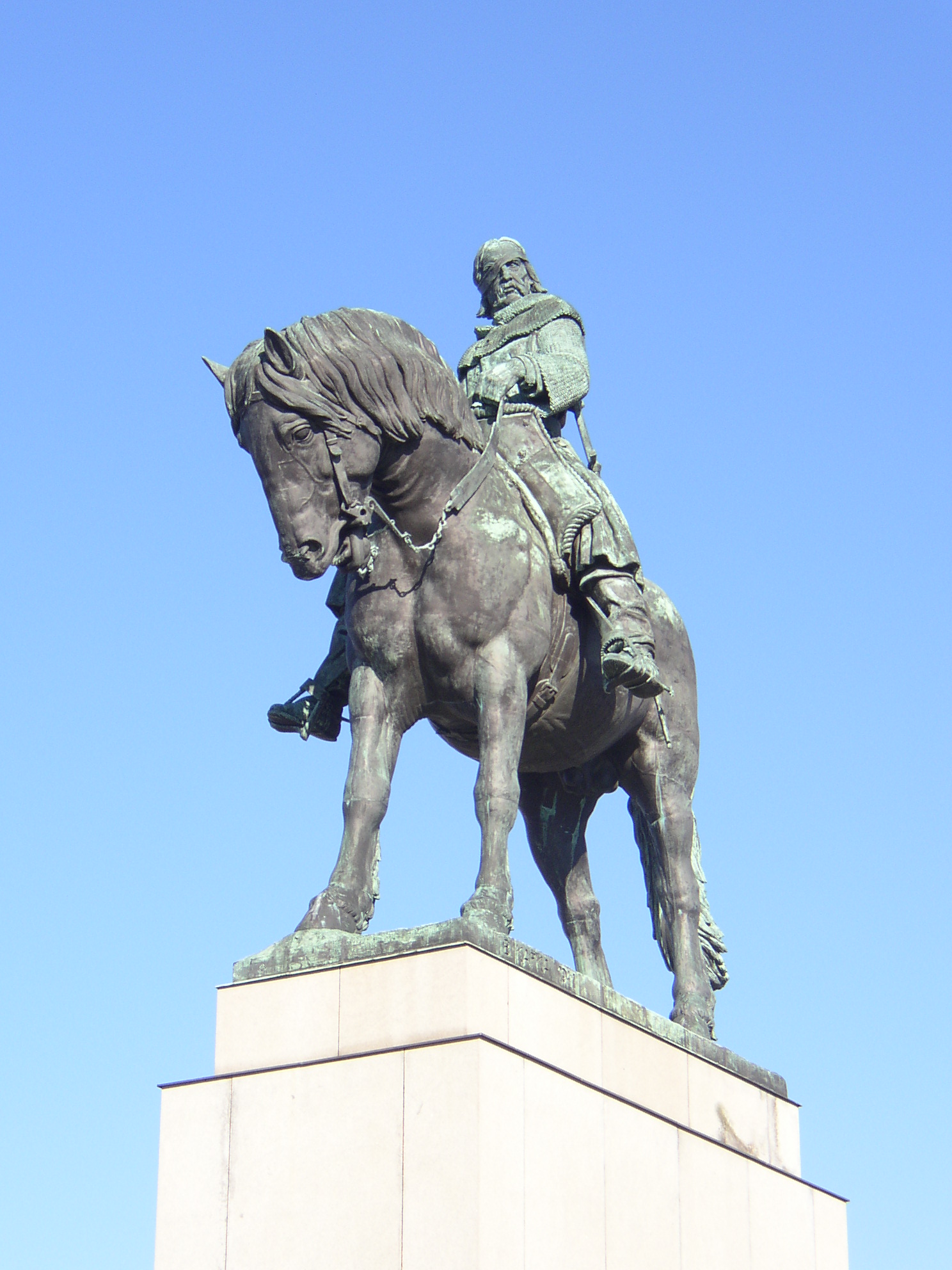
Jan Žižka, the leader of the Hussites

Hus's death sparked the Hussite Wars, decades of religious warfare. Sigismund, the pro-papal king of Hungary and successor to the Bohemian throne after the death of Wenceslas in 1419, failed repeatedly to gain control of the kingdom despite aid by Hungarian and German armies. Riots broke out in Prague. Led by a Czech yeoman, Jan Žižka, the Taborites streamed into the capital. Religious strife pervaded the entire kingdom and was particularly intense in the German-dominated towns. Hussite Czechs and Catholic Germans turned on each other; many were massacred, and many German survivors fled or were exiled to the rest of the Holy Roman Empire. Emperor Sigismund led or instigated various crusades against Bohemia with the support of Hungarians and Bohemian Catholics.

The Hussite Wars followed a pattern. When a crusade was launched against Bohemia, moderate and radical Hussites would unite and defeat it. Once the threat was over, the Hussite armies would focus on raiding the land of Catholic sympathizers. Many historians have painted the Hussites as religious fanatics; they fought in part for a nationalist purpose: to protect their land from a King and a Pope who did not recognize the right of the Hussites to exist. Žižka led armies to storm castles, monasteries, churches, and villages, expelling the Catholic clergy, expropriating ecclesiastical lands, or accepting conversions.

During the struggle against Sigismund, Taborite armies penetrated into areas of modern-day Slovakia as well. Czech refugees from the religious wars in Bohemia settled there, and from 1438 to 1453 a Czech noble, John Jiskra of Brandýs, controlled most of southern Slovakia from the centers of Zólyom (today Zvolen) and Kassa (today Košice). Thus Hussite doctrines and the Czech Bible were disseminated among the Slovaks, providing the basis for a future link between the Czechs and their Slovak neighbors.

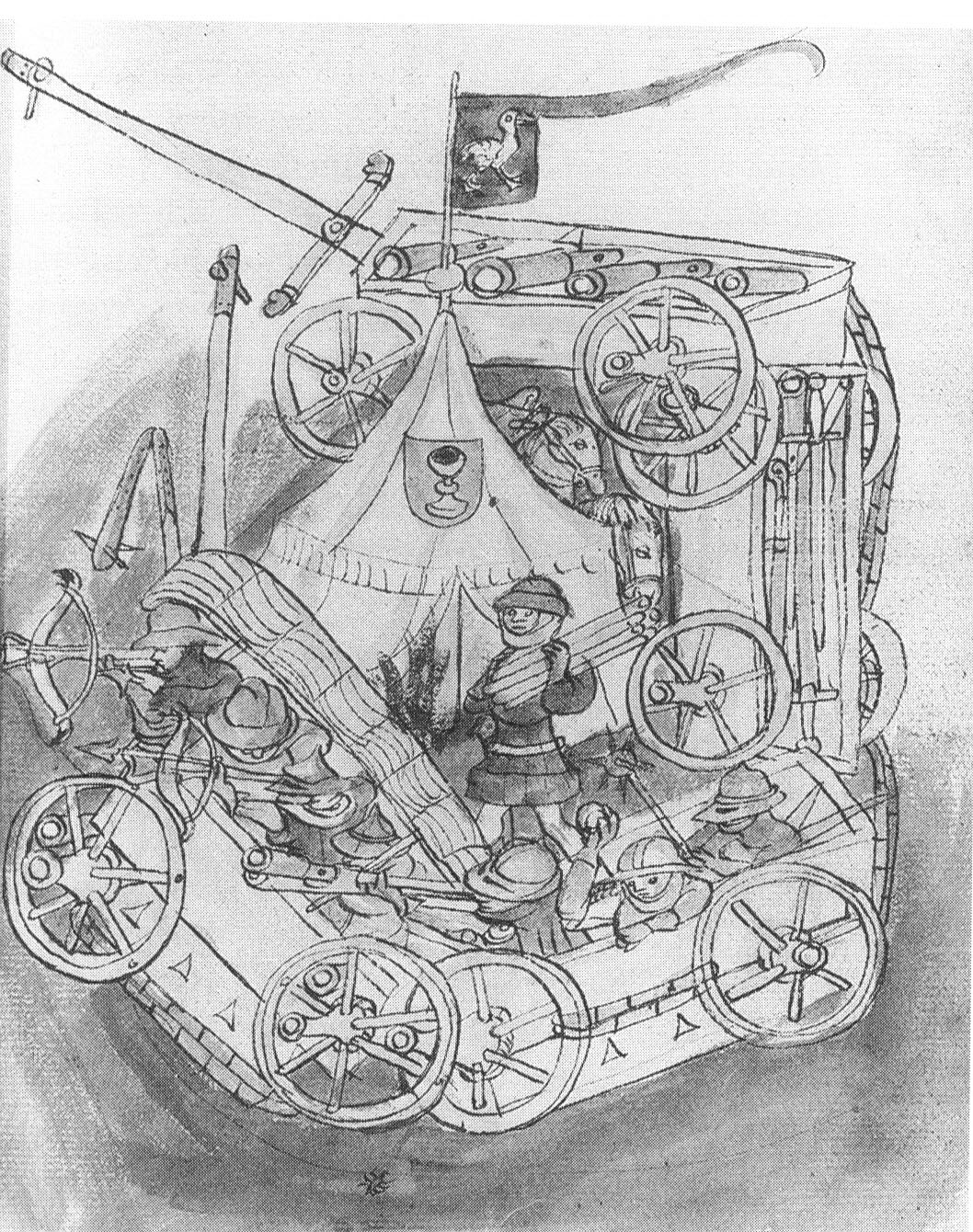
The Hussite wagon fort

When Sigismund died in 1437, the Bohemian estates elected Albert of Austria as his successor. Albert died and his son, Ladislaus the Posthumous – so called because he was born after his father's death – was acknowledged as king. During Ladislaus' minority, Bohemia was ruled by a regency composed of moderate reform nobles who were Utraquists. Internal dissension among the Czechs provided the primary challenge to the regency. A part of the Czech nobility remained Catholic and loyal to the pope. A Utraquist delegation to the Council of Basel in 1433 had negotiated a seeming reconciliation with the Catholic Church. The Compacts of Basel accepted the basic tenets of Hussitism expressed in the Four Articles of Prague: communion under both kinds; free preaching of the Gospels; expropriation of church land; and exposure and punishment of public sinners. The pope, however, rejected the compact, thus preventing the reconciliation of Czech Catholics with the Utraquists.

George of Poděbrady, later to become the "national" king of Bohemia, emerged as leader of the Utraquist regency. George installed another Utraquist, John of Rokycany, as archbishop of Prague and succeeded in uniting the more radical Taborites with the Czech Reformed Church. The Catholic party was driven out of Prague. After Ladislaus died of leukemia in 1457, the following year the Bohemian estates elected George of Poděbrady as king. Although George was noble-born, he was not a successor of royal dynasty; his election to the monarchy was not recognised by the Pope, or any other European monarchs.

George sought to establish a "Charter of a Universal Peace Union". He believed that all monarchs should work for a sustainable peace on the principle of national sovereignty of states, principles of non-interference, and solving problems and disputes before an International Tribunal. Also, Europe should unite to fight the Turks. States would have one vote each, with a leading role for France. George did not see a specific role for Papal authority.

Czech Catholic nobles joined in the League of Zelená Hora in 1465, challenging the authority of George of Poděbrady; the next year, Pope Paul II excommunicated George. The Bohemian War (1468–1478) pitted Bohemia against Matthias Corvinus and Frederick III of Habsburg, and the Hungarian forces occupied most of Moravia. George of Poděbrady died in 1471.

=== After 1471: Jagiellonian and Habsburg rule ===
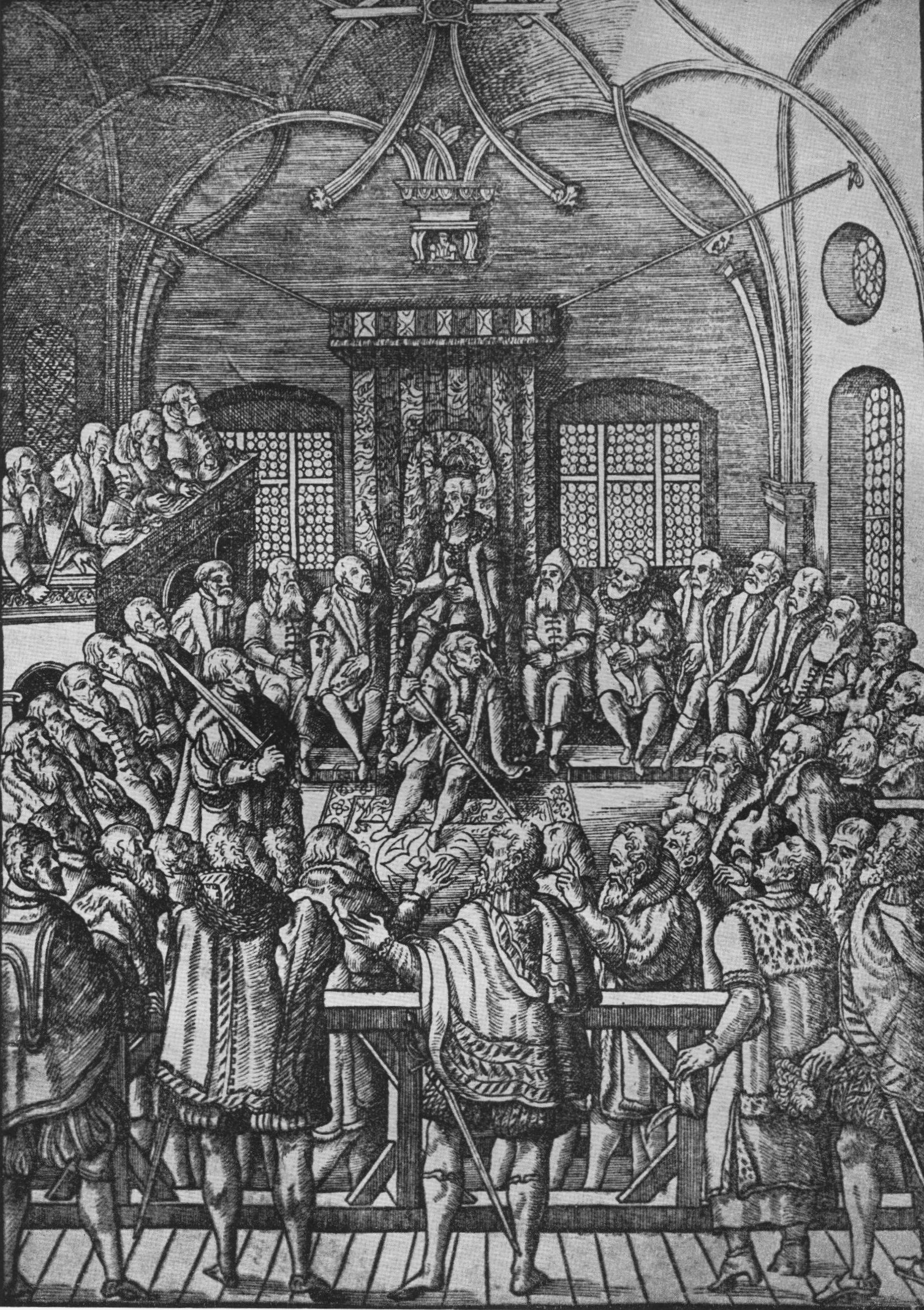
The Bohemian Diet in 1564

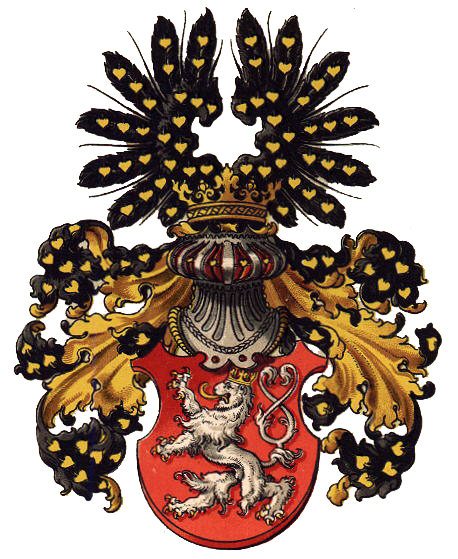
Coat of arms of the Austrian province of Bohemia by Hugo Gerard Ströhl

Upon the death of the Hussite king, George of Poděbrady, the Bohemian Diet elected the Polish prince Vladislaus of the Jagiellonian dynasty as king. In 1479, Mattias and Vladislaus made the Peace of Olomouc, which ceded some of Bohemia's territory to Hungary ended the Bohemian–Hungarian War. After Matthias died in 1490, the Diet of Hungary elected Vladislaus as king of Hungary as well, holding both Bohemia and the Kingdom of Hungary in personal union.

The Jagiellonian dynasty governed Bohemia as absentee monarchs because the Hungarian nobility insisted on them putting their capital into Hungary; their influence in the kingdom was minimal, and effective government fell to the regional nobility. Czech Catholics accepted the Compacts of Basel in 1485 and were reconciled with the Utraquist Hussites. The Bohemian estrangement from the Empire continued; not considered an Imperial State, the Lands of the Bohemian Crown were not part of the Imperial Circles established by the 1500 Imperial Reform.

In 1526, Vladislaus's son, King Louis II of Hungary, was killed at the Battle of Mohács, fighting the Ottoman Empire. Louis' death ended the Jagiellonian dynasty in Bohemia and Hungary; Louis' lands were partitioned between the Ottoman Empire, the Habsburg monarchy, and the newly formed Eastern Hungarian Kingdom. The Bohemian Diet elected Louis' brother-in-law, Archduke Ferdinand, as the new king of Bohemia, beginning almost four centuries of Habsburg rule for both Bohemia and Hungary.

From 1599 to 1711, Moravia (a Land of the Bohemian Crown) was frequently subjected to raids by the Ottoman Empire and its vassals (especially the Tatars and Transylvania). Overall, hundreds of thousands were enslaved whilst tens of thousands were killed.

The incorporation of Bohemia into the Habsburg monarchy against the resistance of the local Protestant nobility sparked the 1618 Defenestration of Prague, the brief reign of the Winter King, and the Thirty Years' War. Their defeat at the Battle of White Mountain in 1620 put an end to the Bohemian autonomy movement. In 1624, Emperor Ferdinand II issued a patent that allowed only the Catholic religion in Bohemia.

=== Defeat and dissolution ===
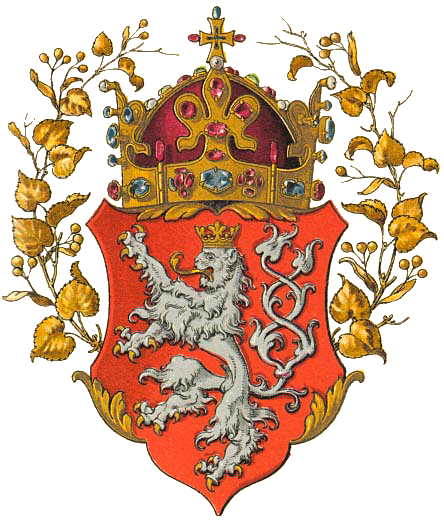
Ströhl's unofficial artwork of the Coat of arms of the kingdom (with the Crown of Saint Wenceslas, part of the Bohemian crown jewels)

In 1740 the Prussian Army conquered Bohemian Silesia in the Silesian Wars and forced Maria Theresa in 1742 to cede the majority of Silesia, except the southernmost area with the duchies of Cieszyn, Krnov and Opava, to Prussia. In 1756 Prussian King Frederick II faced an enemy coalition led by Austria, when Maria Theresa was preparing for war with Prussia to reclaim Silesia. The Prussian army conquered Saxony and in 1757 invaded Bohemia. In the Battle of Prague (1757) they defeated the Habsburgs and subsequently occupied Prague. More than one quarter of Prague was destroyed and the St. Vitus Cathedral suffered heavy damage. In the Battle of Kolín, however, Frederick lost and had to vacate Prague and retreat from Bohemia.

With the dissolution of the Holy Roman Empire in 1806, the Bohemian kingdom was incorporated into the now two years old Austrian Empire and the royal title retained alongside the title of Austrian Emperor. In the course of the 1867 Austro-Hungarian Compromise the provinces of Bohemia, Moravia and Austrian Silesia became k. k. crown lands of Cisleithania. The Bohemian Kingdom officially ceased to exist in 1918 by transformation into the Czechoslovak Republic.

The current Czech Republic consisting of Bohemia, Moravia and Czech Silesia still uses most of the symbols of the Kingdom of Bohemia: a two-tailed lion in its coat-of-arms, red-white stripes in the state flag and the royal castle as the president's office.

== Economy ==
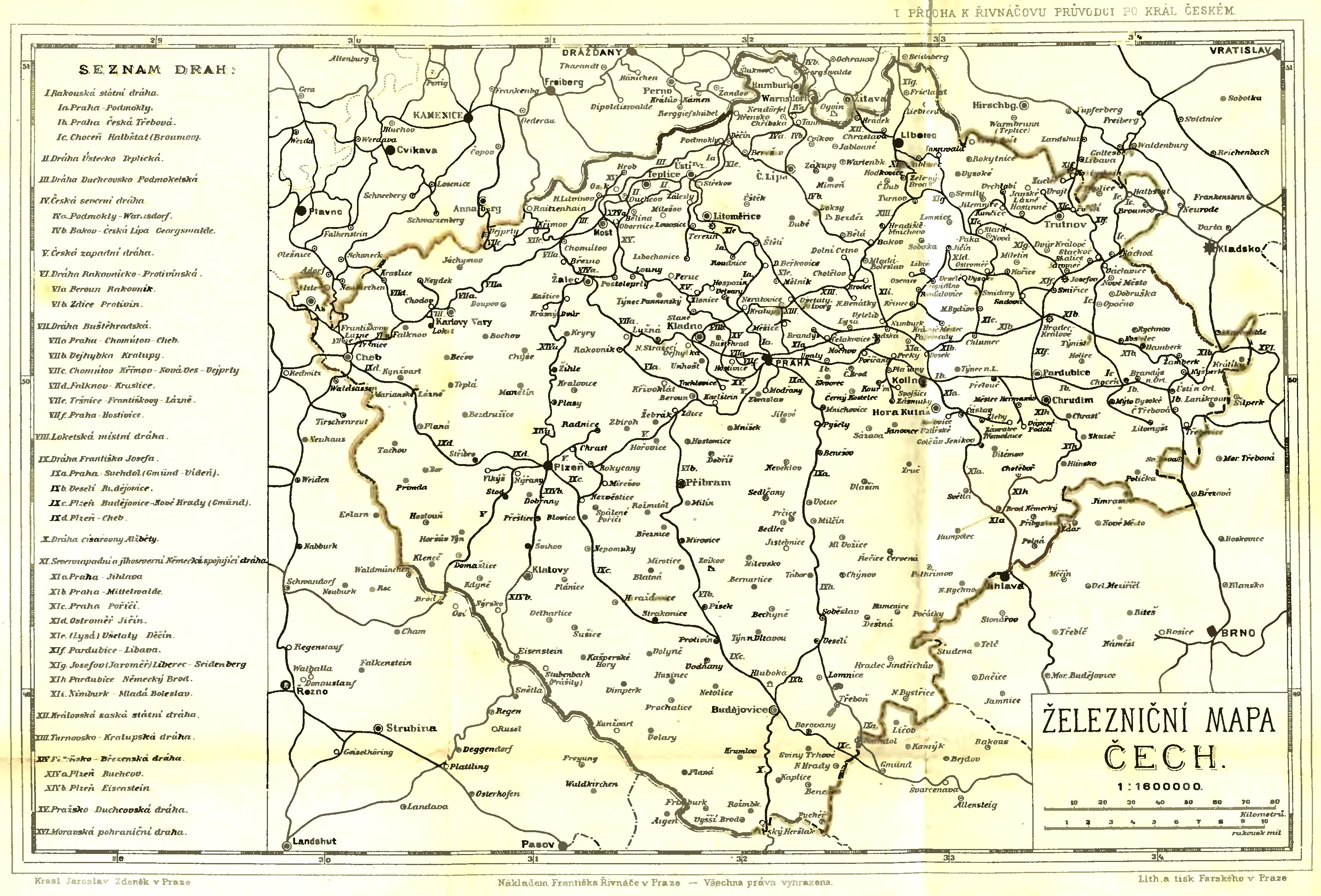
Railway network of Bohemia in 1883

Bohemia was among the first countries in Europe to become industrialized. Mining of tin and silver began in Ore mountains in early 12th century. The German hospes had a major role in the industrial development of the Czech Kingdom. In the late 12th and in the 13th century the Přemyslid rulers promoted the colonisation of certain areas of their lands by German settlers from the adjacent lands of Bavaria, Franconia, Upper Saxony and Austria during the Ostsiedlung migration. The new settlers not only brought their customs and language with them, but also new technical skills and equipment that were adapted within a few decades, especially in agriculture and crafts. In Silesia it had doubled (16% of the total area) by the beginning of the 11th century, 30% in the 16th century and the highest increase rates in the 14th century, the total area of arable land increased seven – to twentyfold in many Silesian regions during the Ostsiedlung. They settled mostly the hills and mountains and started the mine works and high qualities industry such as metal works, weapon industry and beer making. Forest glass production was a common industry for German Bohemians.

== Lands of the Bohemian Crown ==
Bohemia and Lands of the Bohemian Crown in 1618

Bohemia proper (Čechy) with the County of Kladsko (Hrabství kladské) was the main area of the Kingdom of Bohemia. The Egerland (Chebsko) was ultimately obtained by King Wenceslaus II between 1291 and 1305; given in pawn to Bohemia by King Louis IV of Germany in 1322 and subsequently joined in personal union with Bohemia proper. In 1348 Charles IV created the Crown of Bohemia (Koruna česká), together with the incorporated provinces:

- the Margraviate of Moravia (Markrabství moravské), acquired by Přemyslid and Slavník Bohemian rulers after the 955 Battle of Lechfeld, lost in 999 to Poland and reconquered by Duke Bretislaus I in 1019/1029 (uncertain dating);
- Upper Lusatia (Horní Lužice), incorporated by Charles' father King John of Bohemia in 1319 (Bautzen Land) and 1329 (Görlitz), and Lower Lusatia (Dolní Lužice, former March of Lusatia), acquired by Charles IV from the Wittelsbach duke Otto V of Bavaria in 1367. The Habsburg emperor Ferdinand II ceded the Lusatias to the Electorate of Saxony by the 1635 Peace of Prague;
- the Duchies of Silesia (Slezsko), acquired by the 1335 Treaty of Trentschin between King John of Bohemia and King Casimir III of Poland. Queen Maria Theresa lost Silesia in 1742 to the Prussian king Frederick the Great by the Treaty of Breslau, with the exception of Austrian Silesia.
- the northern part of the Upper Palatinate ("Bohemian Palatinate") at Sulzbach, incorporated into the Bohemian crown by Charles IV in 1355. Charles exchanged parts of this territory for Brandenburg in 1373, while his son Wenceslaus lost the rest in 1400 to the Electorate of the Palatinate under King Rupert of Germany;
- the Brandenburg Electorate, acquired in 1373 by Charles IV from the Wittelsbach duke Otto V of Bavaria. Charles' son Emperor Sigismund granted Brandenburg to Frederick I of Hohenzollern in 1415.

at times were incorporated into the Kingdom of Bohemia these provinces:

- the Duchy of Austria in 1251, the Duchy of Styria in 1261, the Egerland in 1266, the Duchy of Carinthia with the March of Carniola and the Windic March in 1269, and the March of Friuli in 1272, all acquired by the Přemyslid king Ottokar II of Bohemia but lost to Rudolph of Habsburg in the 1278 Battle on the Marchfeld;

The modern Czech Republic (Czechia) is the legal successor of the Crown of Bohemia, as stated in the preamble to its Constitution.

== Administrative division ==
=== Kraje/Kreise of Bohemia (pre-1833) ===
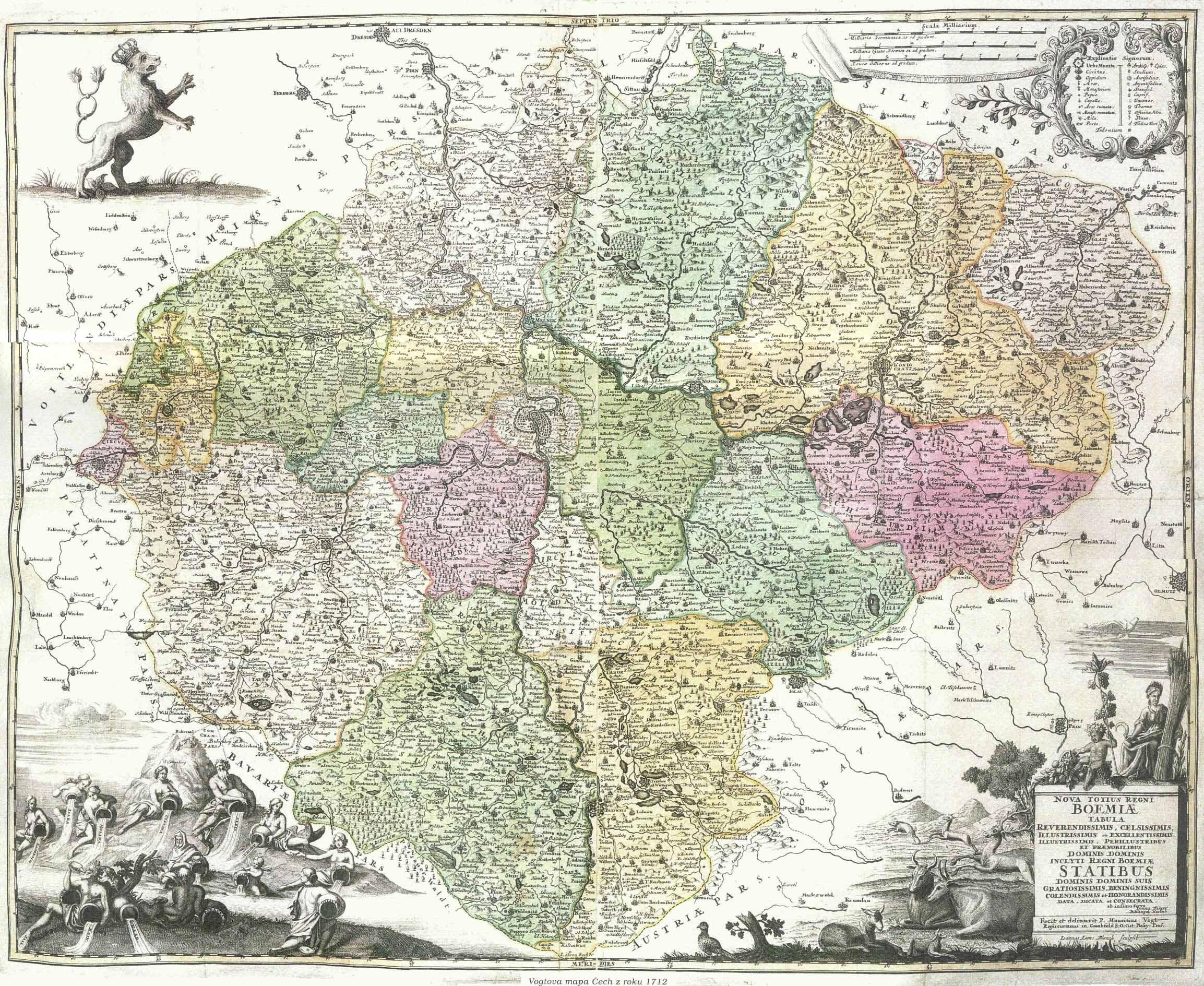
Administrative divisions of Bohemia in 1712

Prior to 1833, Bohemia was divided into seven to sixteen district units, known in Czech as Kraje (sing. Kraj) and in German as Kreise (sing. Kreis). These included the following in different time periods:

- Bechyňský kraj at Bechyně (German: Beching)
- Boleslavský kraj at Mladá Boleslav (German: Jung-Bunzlau)
- Čáslavský kraj at Čáslav (German: Czaslau, Tschaslau)
- Chrudimský kraj at Chrudim
- Hradecký kraj at Hradec Králové (German: Königgrätz)
- the County of Kladsko at Kladsko (German: Glatz); lost to Prussia following the First Silesian War (1740–42)
- Kouřimský kraj at Prague (Czech: Praha, German: Prag); named for Kouřim (German: Kaurzim, Kaurzin, Kaurim)
- Litoměřický kraj at Litoměřice (German: Leitmeritz)
- Loketský kraj at Loket (German: Elbogen)
- Plzeňský kraj at Plzeň (German: Pilsen)
- Podbrdsko or Berounský kraj at Beroun (German: Beraun)
- Prácheňsko or Prácheňský kraj at Písek (German: Prachens; named after Prácheň castle)
- Rakovnický kraj at Rakovník (German: Rakonitz)
- Slánský kraj at Slaný (German: Schlan)
- Vltavský kraj at Vltava (German: Moldau)
- Žatecký kraj at Žatec (German: Saaz)

=== Kraje/Kreise 1833–1849 ===
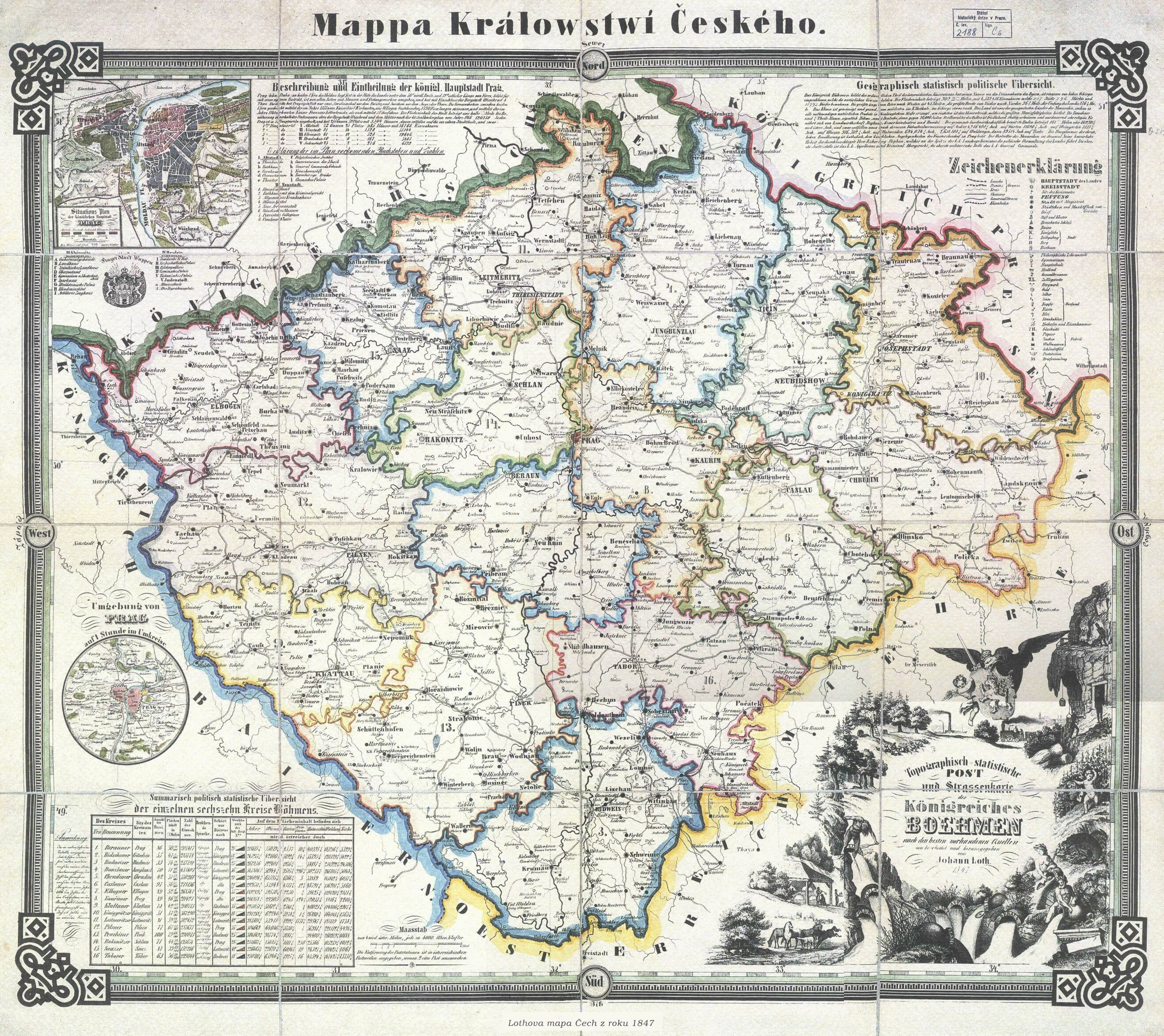
Administrative divisions of Bohemia in 1847

According to Johann Gottfried Sommer Bohemia was divided into 16 district units between 1833 and 1849:

- Berounský kraj (German: Berauner Kreis)
- Bydžovský kraj at Nový Bydžov (German: Bidschower Kreis)
- Budějovický kraj at České Budějovice (German: Budweiser Kreis)
- Boleslavský kraj (German: Bunzlauer Kreis)
- Čáslavský kraj (German: Caslaver Kreis)
- Chrudimský kraj (German: Chrudimer Kreis)
- Loketský kraj (German: Elbogener Kreis)
- Kouřimský kraj (German: Kaurimer Kreis)
- Klatovský kraj at Klatovy (German: Klattauer Kreis)
- Hradecký kraj (German: Königgrätzer Kreis)
- Litoměřický kraj (German: Leitmeritzer Kreis)
- Plzeňský kraj (German: Pilsener Kreis)
- Prácheňský kraj at Písek (German: Prachiner Kreis); named after Prácheň castle)
- Rakovnický kraj (German: Rakonitzer Kreis)
- Táborský kraj (German: Taborer Kreis)
- Žatecký kraj (German: Saazer Kreis)

=== Okresy/Bezirke 1849–1854 ===
In 1849 the number of Kreise/Kraje was reduced to seven. They were then subdivided into political districts (German: politischer Bezirk or Bezirkshauptmannschaft ('district captaincy'), pl. politische Bezirke/Bezirkshauptmannschaften; Czech: Okres), which took over most of the political functions of the Kreise/Kraje. Prague became a statutory city, administered directly by the kingdom. A total of 79 districts existed during this period.

- City of Prague
- Prager Kreis – 8 political districts:
  - Smichow
  - Eule
  - Carolinenthal
  - Rakonitz
  - Schlan
  - Melnik
  - Przibram
  - Horzowic
- Budweiser Kreis – 9 political districts:
  - Budweis
  - Krumau
  - Kaplitz
  - Neuhaus
  - Tabor
  - Mühlhausen
  - Pilgram
  - Beneschau
  - Wotitz
- Pardubitzer Kreis – 11 political districts:
  - Pardubitz
  - Kolin
  - Schwarz-Kosteletz
  - Kuttenberg
  - Ledetsch
  - Deutsch-Brod
  - Chotieborg
  - Chrudim
  - Hohenmauth
  - Leitomischl
  - Landskron
- Gitschiner Kreis – 16 political districts:
  - Gitschin
  - Königgrätz
  - Königinhof
  - Trautenau
  - Braunau
  - Reichenau
  - Senftenberg
  - Neustadt
  - Horzic
  - Hohenelbe
  - Podiebrad
  - Neubidschow
  - Turnau
  - Semil
  - Jungbunzlau
  - Nimburg
- Böhmisch-Leippaer Kreis – 10 political districts:
  - Böhmisch-Leippa
  - Reichenberg
  - Friedland
  - Gabel
  - Tetschen
  - Außig
  - Schlukenau
  - Rumburg
  - Dauba
  - Leitmeritz
- Egerer Kreis – 12 political districts:
  - Eger
  - Falkenau
  - Plan
  - Tachau
  - Carlsbad
  - Luditz
  - Graßlitz
  - Joachimsthal
  - Saaz
  - Kaaden
  - Brüx
  - Teplitz
- Pilsner Kreis – 13 political districts:
  - Pilsen
  - Rokitzan
  - Kralowitz
  - Klattau
  - Przestiz
  - Bischofteinitz
  - Tauß
  - Schüttenhofen
  - Winterberg
  - Prachatitz
  - Pisek
  - Strakinitz
  - Brzeznitz

=== Kraje/Kreise 1854–1868 ===
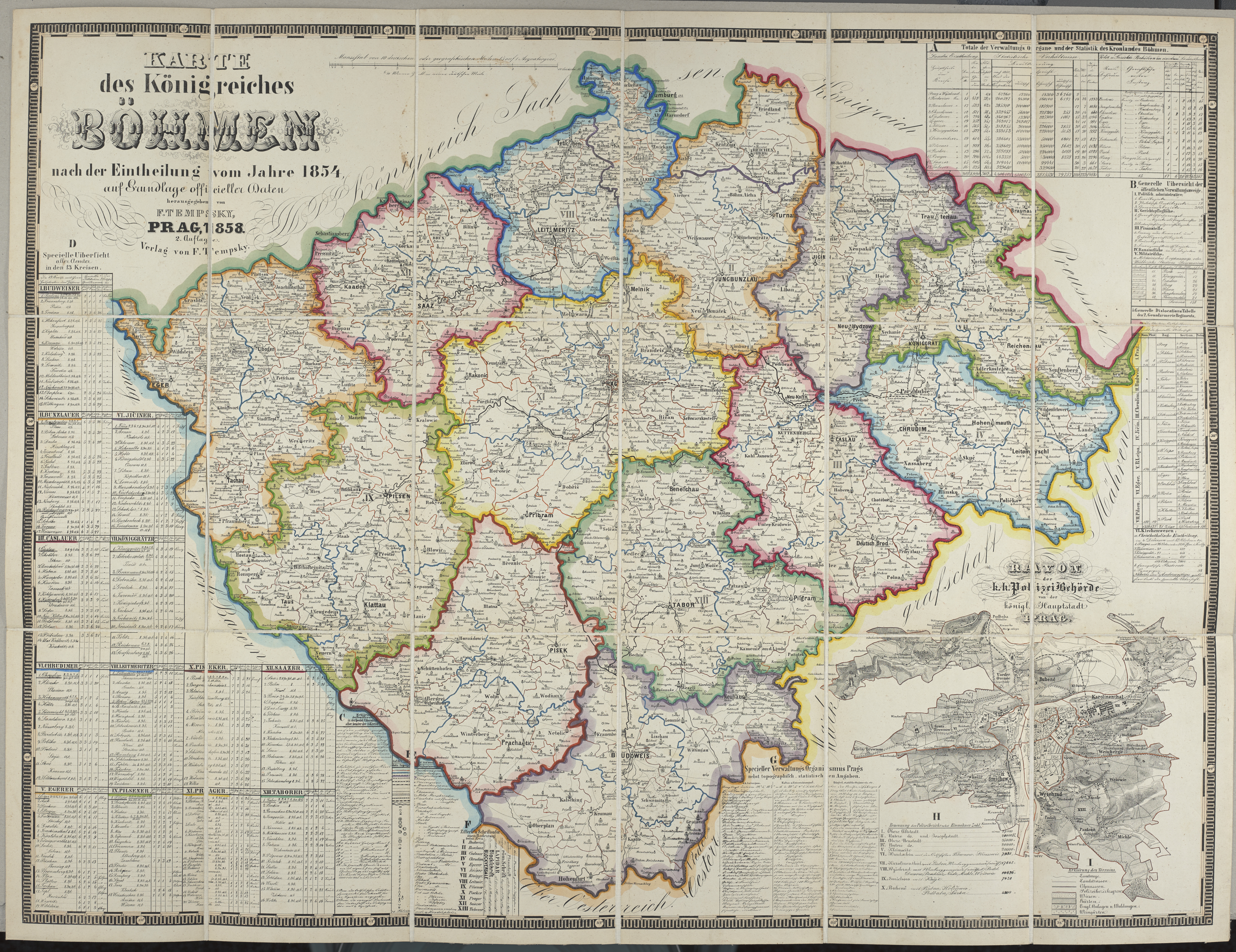
Administrative divisions of Bohemia in 1858

In 1854 the political districts were abolished and the previous more centralised administrative structure largely restored. However, 13 new Kraje/Kreise were established in place of the old ones. These Kraje/Kreise were subdivided into between twelve and 20 Bezirke (207 in total, plus the capital city of Prague); these acted merely as administrative units of the Kraje/Kreise rather than taking on powers of their own. Prague remained a statutory city, as well acting as the administrative centre of the Prager Kreis/Pražský kraj. The city of Reichenberg was a Stadtbezirk (city district) subordinate to the Bunzlauer Kreis, as well as the seat of Landbezirk Reichenberg; the two were counted together as a single Bezirk.

Name (German)	Name (Czech)	Area (square Austrian miles)	Population	Districts (Bezirke, Okresy)
Prag (English: Prague)	Praha	0.2	67,260	1
Budweiser Kreis	Budějovický kraj	78.9	260,597	15
Bunzlauer Kreis	Boleslavský kraj	62.4	385,910	17
Chrudimer Kreis	Chrudimský kraj	58.4	332,455	12
Časlauer Kreis	Čáslavský kraj	68.6	340,267	14
Egerer Kreis	Chebský kraj	75.7	342,017	19
Jičiner Kreis	Jičínský kraj	51.7	318,855	16
Königgrätzer Kreis	Hradecký kraj	51.6	333,153	13
Leitmeritzer Kreis	Litoměřický kraj	55.0	386,401	19
Pilsner Kreis	Plzeňský kraj	86.0	358,603	18
Piseker Kreis		77.4	288,088	13
Prager Kreis	Pražský kraj	101.6	443,378	20
Saazer Kreis	Žatecký kraj	54.9	219,441	15
Taborer Kreis	Táborský kraj	80.5	329,680	16
Total		902.9	4,406,105	208

11 of the Kraje/Kreise had a single district court (Kreisgericht). These were located in the administrative centre of the Kraj/Kreis, except for the Čáslavský kraj/Časlauer Kreis, whose district court was located at Kutná Hora/Kuttenberg. The Bunzlauer and Leitmeritzer Kreise (Boleslavský and Litoměřický kraje) each had two district courts: Jung-Bunzlau and Reichenberg for the Bunzlauer Kreis; Leitmeritz and Böhmisch-Leipa for the Leitmeritzer Kreis.

=== Okresy/Bezirke 1868–1954 ===
Districts of Bohemia in 1893

In 1868 the Kraj/Kreis system was abolished and the political districts re-established. In 1868 Bohemia was divided into 89 political districts, each of which was constituted from between one and four of the 1854 administrative districts. This would grow to 104 districts by 1913.

1868 districts:

- Asch (Czech: Aš)
- Außig (Czech: Ústí nad Labem)
- Beneschau (Czech: Benešov)
- Bischofteinitz (Czech: Horušův Týn)
- Blatna (Czech: Blatná)
- Böhmisch Brod (Czech: Český Brod)
- Böhmisch Leipa (Czech: Česká Lípa)
- Braunau (Czech: Broumov)
- Brüx (Czech: Most)
- Budweis (Czech: Budějovice)
- Časlau (Czech: Čáslav)
- Chotěboř
- Chrudim
- Dauba (Czech: Dubá)
- Deutsch Gabel (Czech: Německé Jablonné)
- Deutschbrod (Czech: Německý Brod)
- Eger (Czech: Cheb)
- Falkenau (Czech: Falknov)
- Friedland (Czech: Frýdlant)
- Gablonz an der Neiße (Czech: Jablonec nad Nisou)
- Graslitz (Czech: Kraslice)
- Hohenelbe (Czech: Vrchlabí)
- Hohenmauth (Czech: Vysoké Mýto)
- Hořowitz (Czech: Hořovice)
- Jičin (Czech: Jičín)
- Joachimsthal (Czech: Jáchymov)
- Jungbunzlau (Czech: Mláda Boleslav)
- Kaaden (Czech: Kadaň)
- Kaplitz (Czech: Kaplice)
- Karlsbad (Czech: Karlovy Vary)
- Karolinenthal (Czech: Karlín)
- Klattau (Czech: Klatovy)
- Kolin (Czech: Kolín)
- Komotau (Czech: Chomutov)
- Königgrätz (Czech: Hradec Králové)
- Königinhof an der Elbe (Czech: Dvůr Králové nad Labem)
- Kralowitz (Czech: Kralovice)
- Krumau (Czech: Krumlov)
- Kuttenberg (Czech: Kutná Hora)
- Landskron (Czech: Lanškroun)
- Laun (Czech: Louny)
- Ledeč
- Leitmeritz (Czech: Litoměřice)
- Leitomischl (Czech: Litomyšl)
- Luditz (Czech: Žlutice)
- Melnik (Czech: Mělník)
- Mies (Czech: Stříbro)
- Moldauthein (Czech: Týn nad Vltavou)
- Mühlhausen (Czech: Milevsko)
- Münchengrätz (Czech: Mnichovo Hradiště)
- Neubydžow (Czech: Nový Bydžov)
- Neuhaus (Czech: Jindřichův Hradec)
- Neustadt an der Mettau (Czech: Nové Město nad Metují)
- Pardubitz (Czech: Pardubice)
- Pilgram (Czech: Pelhřimov)
- Pilsen (Czech: Plzeň)
- Pisek (Czech: Písek)
- Plan (Czech: Planá)
- Poděbrad (Czech: Poděbrady)
- Podersam (Czech: Podbořany)
- Polička
- Polna (dissolved in 1884; Czech: Polná)
- Prachatitz (Czech: Prachatice)
- Prague (statutory city; German: Prag; Czech: Praha)
- Přestitz (Czech: Přeštice)
- Příbram (Czech: Příbram)
- Rakonitz (Czech: Rakovník)
- Raudnitz (Czech: Roudnice nad Labem)
- Reichenau an der Kněžna (Czech: Rychnov nad Kněžnou)
- Reichenberg (statutory city and seat of the Bezirkshauptmannschaft; Czech: Liberec)
- Rumburg (Czech: Rumburk)
- Saaz (Czech: Žatec)
- Schlan (Czech: Slaný)
- Schluckenau (Czech: Šluknov)
- Schüttenhofen (Czech: Sušice)
- Selčan (Czech: Sedlčany)
- Semil (Czech: Semily)
- Senftenberg (Czech: Žamberk)
- Smichow (Czech: Smíchov; district seat: Prague)
- Starkenbach (Czech: Jilemnice)
- Strakonitz (Czech: Strakonice)
- Tabor (Czech: Tábor)
- Tachau (Czech: Tachov)
- Taus (Czech: Domažlice)
- Tepl (Czech: Teplá)
- Teplitz-Schönau (Czech: Teplice-Šanov)
- Tetschen (Czech: Děčín)
- Trautenau (Czech: Trutnov)
- Turnau (Czech: Turnov)
- Wittingau (Czech: Třeboň)

Districts established after 1868:

- Brandeis an der Elbe (after 1908; Czech: Brandýs nad Labem)
- Dux (after 1896; Czech: Duchcov)
- Elbogen (before 1913 part of the Falkenau district; Czech: Loket)
- Humpoletz (from 1910; Czech: Humpolec)
- Kamenitz an der Linde (from 1905; Czech: Kamenice nad Lipou)
- Kladno (from 1893)
- Königliche Weinberge (from 1884; Czech: Královské Vinohrady)
- Kralup an der Moldau (before 1913 part of the Schlan district; Czech: Kralupy nad Vltavou)
- Neupaka (from 1903; Czech: Nová Paka)
- Marienbad (from 1902; Czech: Mariánské Lázně)
- Nachod (before 1899 part of the Neustadt an der Mettau district; Czech: Náchod)
- Neudek (from 1910; Czech: Neydek)
- Preßnitz (from 1902; Czech: Přísečnice)
- Rokitzan (from 1896; Czech: Rokycany)
- Warnsdorf (from 1908; Czech: Varnsdorf)
- Žižkov (from 1898)

== Demographics ==
=== 1910 census ===
Population by religion
Religion	Number	%
Latin Catholics	6,475,835	95.66
Lutherans	98,379	1.45
Jewish	85,826	1.26
Calvinists	78,562	1.16
Old Catholics	14,631	0.21
Greek Catholics	1,691	0.02
Moravian Church	891	0.01
Greek Orthodox	824	0.01
Anglicans	173	0.00
Unitarians	20	0.00
Muslims	14	0.00
Armenian Catholics	10	0.00
Lipovans	9	0.00
Armenian Orthodox	8	0.00
Mennonites	4	0.00
Others	1,467	0.02
Nonbelievers	11,204	0.16
Total	6,769,548	100.00

Population by language
Language	Number	%
Czech (together with Slovak)	4,241,918	62.66
German	2,467,724	36.45
Polish	1,541	0.02
Ruthenian	1,062	0.01
Slovenian	292	0.00
Croatian (together with Serbian)	190	0.00
Italian (together with Ladin)	136	0.00
Hungarian	48	0.00
Romanian	33	0.00
Others (mostly Romani)	56,604	0.83
Total	6,769,548	100.00

=== Language distribution by district (1910) ===
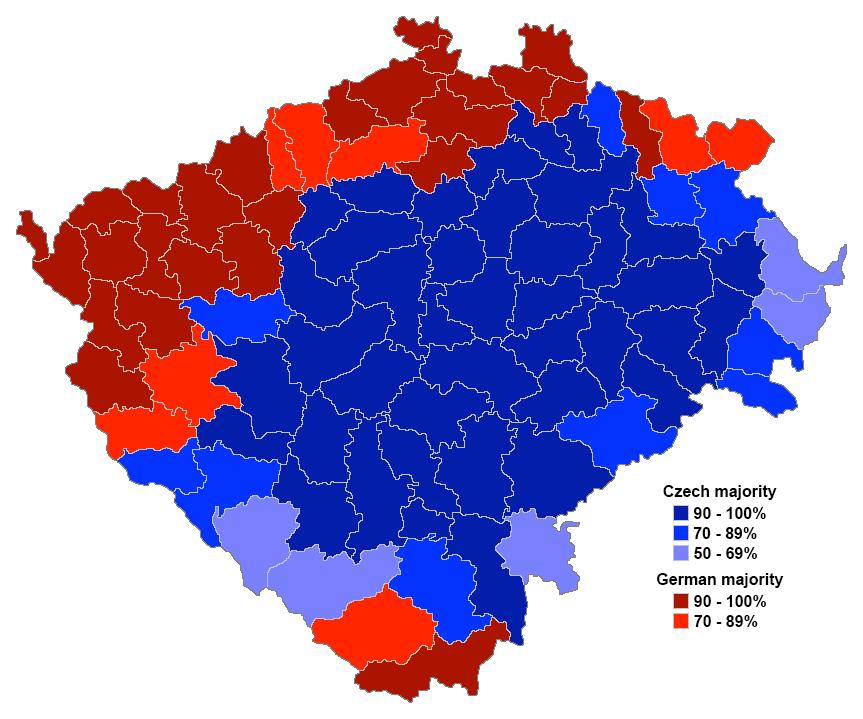
Linguistic distribution in Bohemia in 1910

District (Bezirk)	Czech name	Area (km²)	Population	German	%	Czech	%	Other	%
Asch	Aš	141.83	44,896	41,265	91.9%	5	0.0%	3,626	8.1%
Aussig	Ústí nad Labem	355.78	117,834	108,512	92.1%	6,392	5.4%	2,930	2.5%
Beneschau	Benešov	883.60	68,657	127	0.2%	68,394	99.6%	136	0.2%
Bischofteinitz	Horušův Týn	628.96	49,342	38,024	77.1%	11,154	22.6%	164	0.3%
Blatna	Blatná	680.72	47,563	12	0.0%	47,523	99.9%	28	0.1%
Böhmisch Brod	Český Brod	470.87	48,038	59	0.1%	47,915	99.7%	64	0.1%
Böhmisch Leipa	Česká Lípa	640.60	73,493	70,507	95.9%	2,180	3.0%	806	1.1%
Brandeis an der Elbe (since 1908)	Brandýs nad Labem	303.67	41,928	409	1.0%	41,385	98.7%	13	0.0%
Braunau	Broumov	407.78	56,642	42,224	74.5%	13,583	24.0%	835	1.5%
Brüx	Most	336.60	101,759	75,342	74.0%	25,056	24.6%	1,361	1.3%
Karlsbad	Karlovy Vary	242.12	78,762	77,107	97.9%	210	0.3%	1,445	1.8%
Časlau	Čáslav	603.26	64,224	237	0.4%	63,876	99.5%	111	0.2%
Budweis	Budějovice	1,015.27	120,659	24,929	20.7%	95,317	79.0%	413	0.3%
Chotěboř	Chotěboř	539.07	46,790	284	0.6%	46,427	99.2%	79	0.2%
Chrudim	Chrudim	398.94	41,660	30	0.1%	41,580	99.8%	50	0.1%
Dauba	Dubá	430.43	25,392	24,379	96.0%	931	3.7%	82	0.3%
Deutschbrod	Německý Brod	589.83	50,395	11,506	22.8%	38,809	77.0%	80	0.2%
Dux (since 1896)	Duchcov	369.85	84,388	61,572	73.0%	21,420	25.4%	1,396	1.7%
Eger	Cheb	455.34	69,062	64,030	92.7%	161	0.2%	4,871	7.1%
Elbogen (since 1913)	Loket	207.62	41,758	40,385	96.7%	457	1.1%	916	2.2%
Falkenau	Falknov	291.59	54,237	52,626	97.0%	904	1.7%	707	1.3%
Friedland	Frýdlant	401.06	50,680	48,665	96.0%	335	0.7%	1,680	3.3%
Gablonz an der Neisse	Jablonec nad Nisou	210.11	98,991	90,939	91.9%	6,568	6.6%	1,484	1.5%
Deutsch Gabel	Německé Jablonné	261.07	31,503	30,927	98.2%	322	1.0%	254	0.8%
Graslitz	Kraslice	171.66	39,216	38,649	98.6%	1	0.0%	566	1.4%
Hohenelbe	Vrchlabí	359.65	45,550	43,275	95.0%	1,555	3.4%	720	1.6%
Hohenmauth	Vysoké Mýto	553.25	68,241	705	1.0%	67,407	98.8%	129	0.2%
Hořowitz	Hořovice	581.83	74,915	1,041	1.4%	73,690	98.4%	184	0.2%
Humpoletz (since 1910)	Humpolec	312.24	27,607	16	0.1%	27,564	99.8%	27	0.1%
Jičin	Jičín	620.96	69,166	545	0.8%	68,476	99.0%	145	0.2%
Joachimsthal	Jáchymov	202.09	18,662	18,408	98.6%	9	0.0%	245	1.3%
Jungbunzlau	Mláda Boleslav	568.34	76,989	1,258	1.6%	75,372	97.9%	359	0.5%
Kaaden	Kadaň	466.50	42,598	42,100	98.8%	264	0.6%	234	0.5%
Kamenitz an der Linde (since 1905)	Kamenice nad Lipou	453.20	36,171	8	0.0%	36,113	99.8%	50	0.1%
Kaplitz	Kaplice	905.77	53,796	50,840	94.5%	2,848	5.3%	108	0.2%
Karolinenthal	Karlín	207.64	69,184	3,538	5.1%	65,169	94.2%	477	0.7%
Kladno (since 1893)	Kladno	286.34	80,785	1,412	1.7%	79,172	98.0%	201	0.2%
Klattau	Klatovy	871.74	78,383	17,211	22.0%	60,923	77.7%	249	0.3%
Kolin	Kolín	489.25	73,311	45	0.1%	73,119	99.7%	147	0.2%
Komotau	Chomutov	504.00	74,774	71,537	95.7%	2,058	2.8%	1,179	1.6%
Königgrätz	Hradec Králové	459.53	74,125	721	1.0%	73,131	98.7%	273	0.4%
Königinhof an der Elbe	Dvůr Králové nad Labem	375.86	69,791	18,017	25.8%	51,260	73.4%	514	0.7%
Königliche Weinberge (since 1884)	Královské Vinohrady	344.93	182,381	8,565	4.7%	172,305	94.5%	1,511	0.8%
Kralowitz	Kralovice	657.84	35,242	6,178	17.5%	29,015	82.3%	49	0.1%
Kralup an der Moldau	Kralupy nad Vltavou	216.86	32,217	24	0.1%	32,070	99.5%	123	0.4%
Krumau	Krumlov	759.24	61,068	45,161	74.0%	15,729	25.8%	178	0.3%
Kuttenberg	Kutna Hora	550.84	64,037	205	0.3%	63,709	99.5%	123	0.2%
Landskron	Lanškroun	472.22	68,709	26,830	39.0%	41,721	60.7%	158	0.2%
Laun	Louny	358.08	44,699	311	0.7%	44,304	99.1%	84	0.2%
Ledeč	Ledeč	651.72	49,839	16	0.0%	49,790	99.9%	33	0.1%
Leitmeritz	Litoměřice	628.10	90,740	71,439	78.7%	18,397	20.3%	904	1.0%
Leitomischl	Litomyšl	491.86	50,775	14,699	28.9%	36,014	70.9%	62	0.1%
Luditz	Žlutice	498.24	28,906	28,232	97.7%	562	1.9%	112	0.4%
Marienbad (since 1902)	Marianske Lazne	322.25	31,993	31,656	98.9%	14	0.0%	323	1.0%
Melnik	Mělnik	413.39	43,137	72	0.2%	42,892	99.4%	173	0.4%
Mies	Stříbro	877.91	73,109	59,864	81.9%	12,938	17.7%	307	0.4%
Moldauthein	Týn nad Vltavou	254.65	17,008	6	0.0%	16,990	99.9%	12	0.1%
Mühlhausen	Milevsko	608.86	37,694	52	0.1%	37,627	99.8%	15	0.0%
Münchengrätz	Mnichovo Hradiště	438.86	39,021	2,620	6.7%	36,250	92.9%	151	0.4%
Nachod (since 1899)	Náchod	233.32	59,330	320	0.5%	58,685	98.9%	325	0.5%
Neubydžow	Nový Bydžov	491.16	57,905	103	0.2%	57,733	99.7%	69	0.1%
Neudek (since 1910)	Neydek	242.34	36,314	35,898	98.9%	5	0.0%	411	1.1%
Neuhaus	Jindřichův Hradec	711.23	52,409	22,293	42.5%	30,017	57.3%	99	0.2%
Neupaka (since 1903)	Nová Paka	221.64	64,628	2,661	4.1%	61,860	95.7%	107	0.2%
Neustadt an der Mettau	Nové Město nad Metují	445.13	49,634	5,644	11.4%	43,747	88.1%	243	0.5%
Pardubitz	Pardubice	785.86	102,055	751	0.7%	100,996	99.0%	308	0.3%
Pilgram	Pelhřimov	729.50	52,347	32	0.1%	52,253	99.8%	62	0.1%
Pilsen	Plzeň	659.71	156,069	11,763	7.5%	143,591	92.0%	715	0.5%
Pisek	Písek	973.62	79,096	289	0.4%	78,644	99.4%	163	0.2%
Plan	Planá	561.25	34,285	34,092	99.4%	73	0.2%	120	0.4%
Poděbrad	Poděbrady	693.79	82,610	167	0.2%	82,299	99.6%	144	0.2%
Podersam	Podbořany	579.17	43,787	42,280	96.6%	1,350	3.1%	157	0.4%
Politcka	Polička	320.42	34,727	9,904	28.5%	24,788	71.4%	35	0.1%
Prachatitz	Prachatice	1,094.39	74,058	36,127	48.8%	37,740	51.0%	191	0.3%
Prag	Praha	105.10	223,741	18,853	8.4%	202,067	90.3%	2,921	1.3%
Preßnitz (since 1902)	Přísečnice	56.51	17,501	16,878	96.4%	45	0.3%	578	3.3%
Přestitz	Přeštice	517.65	45,298	134	0.3%	45,101	99.6%	63	0.1%
Příbram	Příbram	707.63	67,392	114	0.2%	67,193	99.7%	85	0.1%
Rakonitz	Rakovník	646.44	51,551	845	1.6%	50,642	98.2%	64	0.1%
Raudnitz	Roudnice nad Labem	459.29	53,629	165	0.3%	53,311	99.4%	153	0.3%
Reichenau an der Kněžna	Rychnov nad Kněžnou	412.89	53,056	138	0.3%	52,802	99.5%	116	0.2%
Reichenberg	Liberec	320.24	130,012	118,232	90.9%	8,485	6.5%	3,295	2.5%
Rokitzan (since 1896)	Rokycany	711.00	59,659	347	0.6%	59,106	99.1%	206	0.3%
Rumburg	Rumburk	84.81	29,817	29,220	98.0%	71	0.2%	526	1.8%
Saaz	Žatec	403.25	49,452	46,089	93.2%	2,953	6.0%	410	0.8%
Schlan	Slaný	549.41	86,720	148	0.2%	86,407	99.6%	165	0.2%
Schluckenau	Šluknov	190.84	57,590	55,656	96.6%	92	0.2%	1,842	3.2%
Schüttenhofen	Sušice	817.05	53,295	21,379	40.1%	31,760	59.6%	156	0.3%
Selčan	Sedlčany	744.93	54,051	34	0.1%	53,963	99.8%	54	0.1%
Semil	Semily	313.61	63,046	677	1.1%	62,259	98.8%	110	0.2%
Senftenberg	Žamberk	600.04	58,710	27,726	47.2%	30,581	52.1%	403	0.7%
Smichow	Smíchov	489.22	167,830	5,310	3.2%	161,403	96.2%	1,117	0.7%
Starkenbach	Jilemnice	338.14	49,204	10,848	22.0%	38,243	77.7%	113	0.2%
Strakonitz	Strakonice	863.29	73,903	69	0.1%	73,737	99.8%	97	0.1%
Tabor	Tábor	978.55	79,540	36	0.0%	79,405	99.8%	99	0.1%
Tachau	Tachov	621.80	43,441	43,152	99.3%	26	0.1%	263	0.6%
Taus	Domažlice	492.16	48,680	8,515	17.5%	39,946	82.1%	219	0.4%
Tepl	Teplá	388.51	26,559	26,478	99.7%	9	0.0%	72	0.3%
Teplitz-Schönau	Teplice-Šanov	197.30	102,888	86,679	84.2%	12,851	12.5%	3,358	3.3%
Tetschen	Děčín	602.83	120,400	115,413	95.9%	1,490	1.2%	3,497	2.9%
Trautenau	Trutnov	516.23	85,514	65,694	76.8%	18,968	22.2%	852	1.0%
Turnau	Turnov	330.73	48,186	2,571	5.3%	45,479	94.4%	136	0.3%
Warnsdorf (since 1908)	Varnsdorf	79.38	39,339	37,619	95.6%	599	1.5%	1,121	2.8%
Wittingau	Třeboň	800.78	48,825	1,375	2.8%	47,383	97.0%	67	0.1%
Žižkov (since 1898)	Žižkov	237.99	102,514	1,633	1.6%	100,333	97.9%	548	0.5%
TOTAL			6,703,089	2,453,704	36,6%	4,189,853	62,5%	59,511	0,9%

== See also ==
- List of Bohemian monarchs
- Crown of Saint Wenceslas
- History of the Czech lands
- Kingdom Come: Deliverance

== Bibliography ==
- Pánek, Jaroslav; Tůma Oldřich; et al. (2009). A History of the Czech lands. Prague: Karolinum Press. ISBN 978-80-246-1645-2.
- Bobková, Lenka (2006). 7. 4. 1348 – Ustavení Koruny království českého: český stát Karla IV [Founding of the Crown of Bohemian Kingdom: Czech State of Charles IV] (in Czech). Praha: Havran. ISBN 80-86515-61-3.
- Agnew, Hugh LeCaine (2004). The Czechs and the Lands of the Bohemian Crown. Stanford: Hoover Institution Press. ISBN 0-8179-4492-3.
