= Michalovice Castle =

Castle in Central Bohemia, Czech Republic

Coordinates: 50°26′10.1″N 14°53′18.5″E

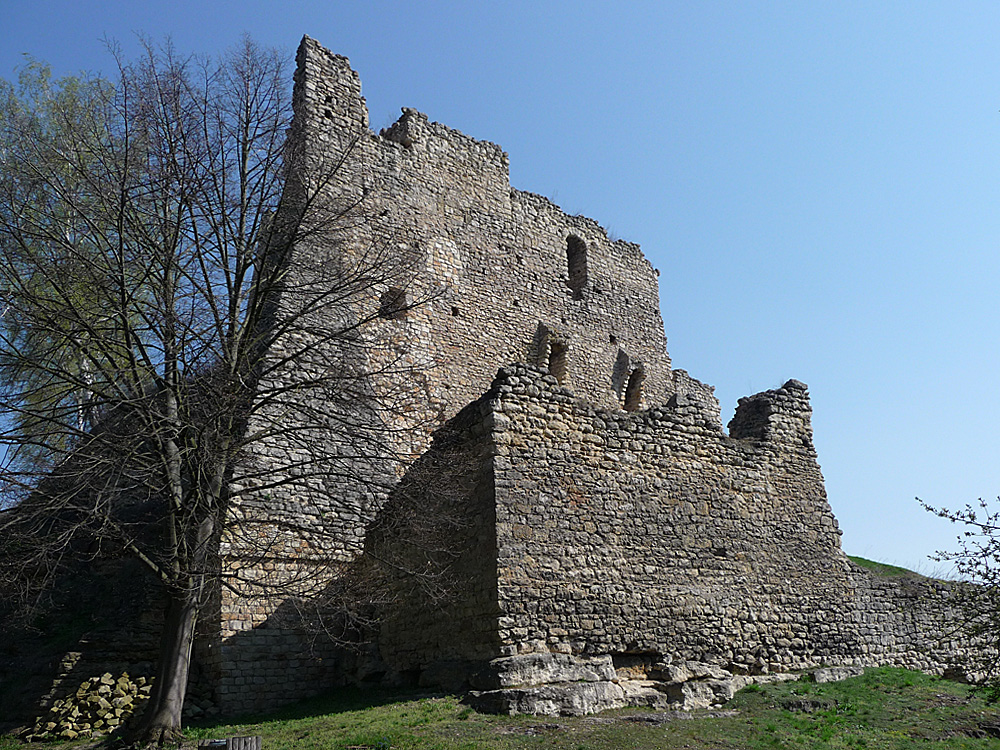
The ruins of Michalovice Castle

Michalovice is a ruined castle near the Jizera river, about 3 kilometres (2 mi) northwest of the town of Mladá Boleslav, in Central Bohemia, Czech Republic. The Putna Tower at the castle is the most tilted structure in the world. It has a tilt of 7.315 degrees, more than the Tower of Pisa.

== Ruins ==
The ruins of the early Gothic architecture Michalovice castle stands on the right bank of the Jizera river. It was built by members of the Markvartice family during the last quarter of the 13th century to replace an earlier manor house. It was left to decay in the 15th century. In the 19th century the remains of the castle were undermined, leaving it in ruins.

== See also ==
- List of castles in the Central Bohemian Region
