= Tricarico (surname) =

Tricarico is a surname. Notable people with the surname include:

- Alberto Tricarico (1927–2024), Italian prelate
- Giuseppe Tricarico (1623–1697), Italian church and opera composer
- Leonardo Tricarico (born 1942), Italian Air Force general
- Nicola Tricarico (fl. 1690s), Italian contralto opera singer
- Tricarico (singer) (born 1971), Italian singer-songwriter

== See also ==
- Tricarico (disambiguation)
