= BUX =

Hungarian stock market index

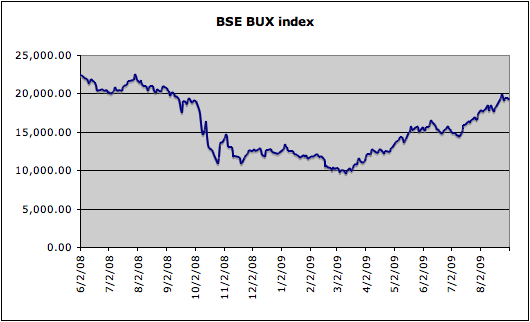
- The performance of the BUX during the 2008 crisis
- Foundation: January 2, 1991
- Operator: Budapest Stock Exchange
- Exchanges: Budapest Stock Exchange
- Constituents: 12 to 25
- Type: Large-cap
- Weighting method: Free-float capitalization-weighted
- Related indices: CETOP; BUMIX
- Website: BUX Profile

BUX is a blue chip stock market index consisting up to 25 (currently 16) major Hungarian companies trading on the Budapest Stock Exchange. Prices are taken from the electronic Xetra trading system. According to the operator Budapest Stock Exchange, the BUX measures the performance of the Equities Prime Market's 12 to 25 largest Hungarian companies in terms of order book volume and market capitalization. It is the equivalent of the Dow Jones Industrial Average and DAX, the index shows the average price changing of the shares with the biggest market value and turnover in the equity section. Hereby this is the most important index number of the exchange trends.

BSE was one of the first in the world who started to use free-float capitalisation weightings instead of the traditional market capitalisation weightings in October 1999. The base date for the BUX is 2 January 1991 and it was started from a base value of 1,000. It is calculated in real-time based on the actual market prices of a basket of shares. The BUX index is also a tradeable index. Its futures and option products are available in BSE's derivatives section.

Ticker codes: Reuters: BUX, Bloomberg: BUX.

== Annual returns ==
The following table shows the annual development of the BUX since 1991.

Year	Closing level	Change in index in points	Change in index in %
1991	838.32		
1992	891.97	53.65	6.40
1993	1,264.02	372.05	41.71
1994	1,470.13	206.11	16.31
1995	1,528.92	58.79	4.00
1996	4,134.31	2,605.39	170.41
1997	7,999.10	3,864.79	93.48
1998	6,307.67	−1,691.43	−21.15
1999	8,819.45	2,511.78	39.82
2000	7,849.75	−969.70	−11.00
2001	7,131.13	−718.62	−9.15
2002	7,798.29	667.16	9.36
2003	9,379.99	1,581.70	20.28
2004	14,742.60	5,362.61	57.17
2005	20,784.70	6,042.10	40.98
2006	24,874.40	4,089.70	19.68
2007	26,235.60	1,361.20	5.47
2008	12,241.70	−13,993.90	−53.34
2009	21,227.00	8,985.30	73.40
2010	21,327.07	100.07	0.47
2011	16,974.24	−4,352.83	−20.41
2012	18,173.20	1,198.96	7.06
2013	18,564.08	390.88	2.15
2014	16,634.00	−1,930.08	−10.40
2015	23,920.65	7,286.65	43.81
2016	32,003.05	8,082.40	33.79
2017	39,377.31	7,374.26	23.04
2018	39,138.95	−238.36	−0.61
2019	46,082.82	6,943.87	17.74
2020	42,100.00	−3,982.82	−8.64
2021	50,721.71	8,621.00	20.48
2022	43,793.76	−6,927.2	−13.66
2023	60,620.00	16,826.2	38.42
2024	79,326.66	18,706.65	30.86
2025	111,031.79	31,705.13	39.97

== Components ==
The current components and weightings of the index: BUX Composition

Since the March 2022 adjustment, the BUX consists of the following major Hungarian companies:

Company	Exchange	Ticker	ICB Sector	Date of listing	Index weighting (%)
4iG	BSE	4IG	Telecommunications	2004-09-22	0.93
ALTEO	BSE	ALTEO	Electric Utilities	2010-10-12	0.32
ANY Security Printing	BSE	ANY	Diversified Industrials	2005-12-08	0.72
Appeninn Asset Management	BSE	APPENINN	Real Estate	2010-07-02	0.27
AutoWallis	BSE	AUTOWALLIS	Automobiles & Parts	2013-06-25	0.42
Budapest Real Estate	BSE	BIF	Real Estate	1998.02.16	0.42
CIG Pannonia	BSE	CIGPANNONIA	Insurance	2010-11-08	0.29
Delta Technologies	BSE	DELTA	Informatics	1999.02.01	0.13
Graphisoft	BSE	GSPARK	Real Estate	2006-08-28	0.53
Masterplast	BSE	MASTERPLAST	Construction	2011-11-29	0.55
MOL Group	BSE	MOL	Oil & Gas	1995-11-28	24.43
Magyar Telekom	BSE	MTELEKOM	Telecommunications	1997-11-14	6.53
Opus Global	BSE	OPUS	Industrial conglomerate	1998-04-22	2.24
OTP Bank	BSE	OTP	Banks	1995-08-10	39.62
PannErgy	BSE	PANNERGY	Industrial Services	1994-06-13	0.26
Gedeon Richter	BSE	RICHTER	Pharmaceuticals	1994-11-09	21.96
Waberer's International	BSE	WABERERS	Industrial Transportation	2017-06-20	0.37

== Index trackers ==
Passive ETFs providing exposure to the BUX index are available:

- Expat Hungary BUX UCITS ETF – traded in euro and listed on the Frankfurt Stock Exchange, Xetra segment (ticker: HUBE, ISIN: BGHUBUX01189). The fund acts as a conduit for capital flows between the international financial markets and the Hungarian capital market.
- OTP Tőzsdén Kereskedett BUX Indexkövető – traded in Hungarian forint and listed on the Budapest Stock Exchange (ticker: ETFBUXOTP, ISIN: HU0000704960).

== See also ==
- Economy of Hungary
- List of Hungarian companies
- List of companies based in Budapest
- Central European Blue Chip Index
- S&P 500
- Dow Jones Industrial Average
- DAX
- Austrian Traded Index
