= BUMIX =

Stock market index

- Foundation: January 5, 2004
- Operator: Budapest Stock Exchange
- Exchanges: Budapest Stock Exchange
- Constituents: 12 to 25
- Type: Mid- and SmallCap
- Weighting method: Free-float capitalization-weighted
- Related indices: BUX; CETOP20
- Website: BUMIX homepage

The BUMIX is a stock market index composed of 12 to 25 small and medium-sized companies listed on Budapest Stock Exchange.

BUMIX operates (similarly to BUX), as a total return index, i.e., the dividend payout also plays a role in its performance evaluation. Only those series of shares can be admitted to the BUMIX basket where the market capitalisation adjusted for free float does not exceed HUF 125 billion. The calculation method, the review, and the handling of corporate actions is the same as the process applied in the case of the BUX index.

The index is based on prices generated in the electronic trading system Xetra.

== See also ==
- MDAX
- SDAX
- Economy of Hungary
- List of Hungarian companies
- List of companies based in Budapest
