= Triglav (disambiguation) =

Triglav is a prominent peak in Slovenia.

Triglav (Slavic for 'three-headed') may also refer to:

== Places ==
- Triglav (Bulgaria), a section of the central Balkan Mountains in Bulgaria
- 2522 Triglav, an asteroid

== Ships ==
- SMS Triglav, a 1913 Tátra-class destroyer of the Austro-Hungarian Navy, sunk in 1915
- SMS Triglav, a 1917 Ersatz Triglav-class destroyer of the Austro-Hungarian Navy
- Triglav (1939), an Orjen-class torpedo boat of the Royal Yugoslav Navy, captured by Italian forces in 1941
- Slovenian patrol boat Triglav (2010), a Svetlyak-class patrol boat of the Slovenian Armed Forces
- RE-51 Triglav (1949), a Ciclone-class torpedo boat of the Yugoslav Navy, obtained from Italy as war reparation
- PČ-135 Triglav (1964), a C-80-class patrol boat of the Yugoslav Navy

== Other uses ==
- Triglav (computer), 1 1985 computer from Slovenia
- Triglav (mythology), a deity in Slavic mythology
- Triglav Trophy, a figure skating competition
- Koser-Hrovat KB-1 Triglav, a Slovenian glider
- Zavarovalnica Triglav, a Slovenian insurance company

== See also ==
- Troglav (disambiguation)
- Triglavka, a three-pointed hat
