= Tricarico (disambiguation) =

Tricarico is a town and comune in the province of Matera, Basilicata, southern Italy.

Tricarico may also refer to:

- Tricarico (singer), Italian singer-songwriter
- Tricarico (surname), Italian surname

== See also ==
- Triglav (disambiguation)
