= ANY Security Printing Company =

- Type: Public
- Traded as: BPSE: ANY; BUX component
- Industry: Printing, Security printing
- Founded: 1851
- Headquarters: Budapest, Hungary
- Area served: Central and Eastern Europe
- Products: Security documents, Plastic cards, Business forms Mobile development TSM
- Number of employees: 781
- Website: http://www.any.hu/en/

The ANY Security Printing Company (Hungarian: ANY Biztonsági Nyomda Nyrt.), formerly the State Printing Company (Hungarian: Állami Nyomda Nyrt.), is one of the largest security printing companies in Hungary and the CEE region. In the past, the company produced traditional printing products. Today its activities are focused on documenting security products, plastic card production and personalization, electronic document management, and bulk transactional printing. The company's shares have been listed on the Budapest Stock Exchange since December 2005.

== History ==
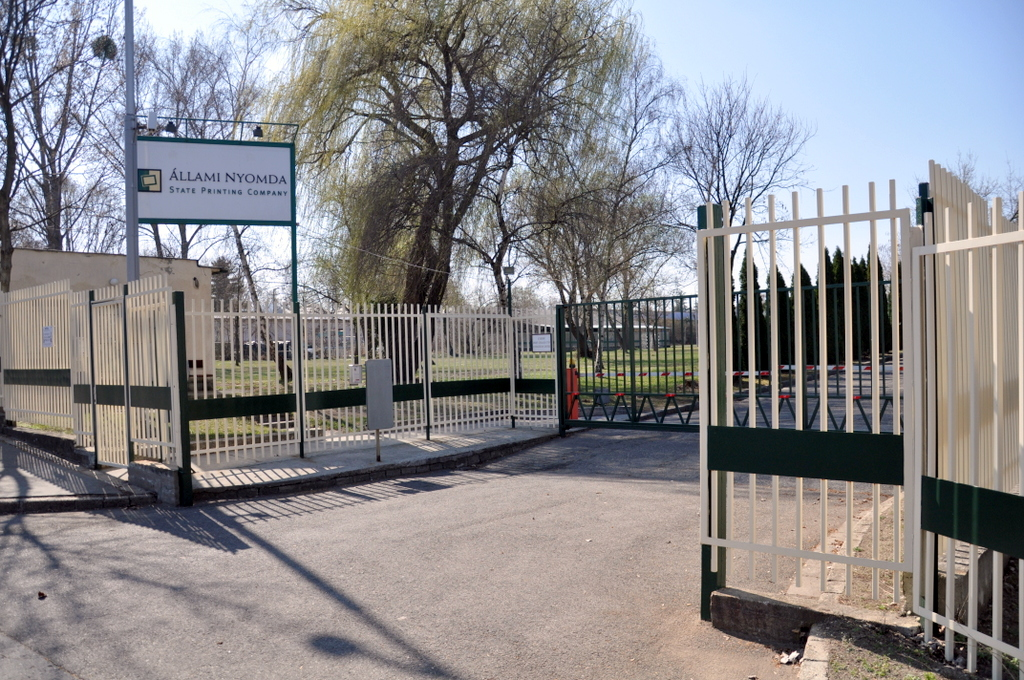
The company's Fátyolka Street entrance

After the Austro-Hungarian Compromise of 1867, the first independent Hungarian government was formed and the legal predecessor of its state printing house, a branch of the Viennese Imperial and Royal Court and State Printing House, was established by the Austrian government in Timișoara after the suppression of the Hungarian Revolution of 1848 and Independence War. The printing house began operation in 1851 and became the largest institution in a town that already had highly developed printing houses.

In 1868, the company moved its operation nearer to the government district of Buda Castle to supply the Hungarian government with state administration forms. The Finance Ministry supervised the Hungarian Royal Cadastral Lithographic Printing House Institute and Map Collection which produced and copied the cadastral (land-register) surveys and maps that served as a basis for land tax. In 1869 the government decided to merge the two printing houses, as it was necessary to solve the domestic production of fee stamps. Due to the merger and development, proper conditions were realized for the fast and reliable production of fee stamps, a process that is confidential until publication. This improved production process extended to other state administration and treasury forms. The new institution was officially named Hungarian Royal State Printing House.

=== State Printing House ===
After the 1901 reorganization, the company's name was changed to State Printing House. The company printed the state budget and its justification, appropriation accounts, important bills, financial gazette and the timetables of the Hungarian State Railways. Hungarian Royal Treasury Notes, different treasury bills, state promissory notes, annuity loan notes, class lottery tickets, blank bills, bills of lading of domestic and foreign freight and cigar and tobacco packaging materials and tax stamps were also produced there. The Hungarian government founded the Hungarian Banknote Printing House in 1922, which started domestic banknote printing in August 1923 in the buildings of the State Printing House. During World War II, the printing house served as a war factory, producing food and fuel notes. After the war, the documents of the post and the railway were printed again, as well as state forms, bonds, and lottery tickets. For the 1945 election, State Printing House printed the election forms, and tax notes during the 1946 hyperinflation crisis. The company has been producing lottery forms and tickets since 1947. The production of election forms every four years also became a stable part of the production portfolio. Due to the investment in 1957, the capacity was expanded, quality improved and the production of multicolour printed stamps was started. In 1960, the company began to print export stamps.

=== Postage stamps ===
After the Austro-Hungarian Compromise of 1867, the Hungarian government needed to pay for postal and office fees with its own stamp to emphasize national sovereignty and for financial, and administrative reasons. Previously, these fees could be paid for only by parallel-published (Austrian-Hungarian) stamps produced in Vienna. The fee stamps were produced in Hungary from 1869 in the State Printing House was managed by the independent Finance Ministry. The provision of the 1867 Compromise concerning postal services came into effect on 1 May. All of the post offices in Hungary came under the purview of the Hungarian Post Directorate. It was claimed independently published Hungarian stamps should be put used by the Hungarian Post. As the emperor's government approved this claim, the first Hungarian newspaper stamp was published on 20 June 1868; his was printed in the Viennese printing house and a German inscription could be read on the watermark. The first postal stamp produced in Hungary was issued in 1871 after the stamp production line of State Printing House was developed.

=== Privatization ===
After the political transition, most of the state monopolies ceased to exist. After state protection ended, the State Printing House was privatized in 1993. The Company moved to Kőbánya, another district of the capital, from its former building near Buda Castle. The new printing house in Halom Street was opened officially on 4 October 1994. The State Printing House took over the equipment and most of the employees of SZÜV Continuous Form Printing House. From 1997, the company began producing plastic cards and in 1998 a new modern plant was established in Fátyolka Street and was developed further in 2000 to produce chip cards. State Printing House established its Document Security Laboratory in 1999, which does research and development. State Printing House started international expansion in 2005 when it founded joint ventures with partners in Romania and Bulgaria, and subsidiaries in Slovakia and Russia.

With state ownership below 5% for the last 20 years, according to the Articles of Association and the related legal provisions, the board of directors decided to change the company's name. The 162-year-old company became ANY Security Printing Company PLC from 1 February 2013. The company's short name is ANY PLC.

=== Products ===
The main activity of ANY Security Printing Company is the production of security products, which include tax stamps, securities, food vouchers, stamps, paper-based documents and the security inks and solutions of the Document Security Laboratory. State Printing House produces the Hungarian card-based ID documents; the personal ID card, the driving license, the motor vehicle ownership card, and the student ID card. The company also produces VISA and MASTERCARD banking cards and smart cards for electronic signatures. ANY group personalizes and develops business forms for banks and insurance companies and it also produces invoices, delivery notes, printed, and blank continuous forms.

== Sources ==
- Géza Buzinkay: State Printing House is 150 years old, 2001, ISBN 963-85674-1-4
- State Printing House Annual Report 2001
- State Printing House website: https://web.archive.org/web/20070804230559/http://www.allaminyomda.com/
- ANY Security Printing Company website: http://www.any.hu
