= Opus Global =

Hungarian conglomerate and asset manager

Opus Global Plc.
- Company type: Public
- Traded as: BPSE: OPUS; BUX Component
- Industry: Asset management Energy industry Food industry Manufacturing; Construction
- Founded: 1912
- Headquarters: Budapest, Hungary
- Area served: Central and Eastern Europe
- Key people: József Vida (Chairman); Dr. Koppány Lélfai (CEO)
- Revenue: ▲US$1.933 billion (2023)
- Net income: ▲US$ 0.126 billion (2023)
- Total assets: ▲US$ 3.022 billion (2023)
- Number of employees: 4,457 (2023)
- Subsidiaries: KALL Ingredients, Wamsler SE, RM International, R-KORD, VIRESOL, HUNGUEST Hotels, Tigáz, Titász, Mészáros Construction, MS Energy
- Website: opusglobal.hu/en

Opus Global is a Hungarian industrial conglomerate and asset management company, headquartered in Budapest, Hungary. Opus Global's subsidiaries play a significant role in Hungary's strategically important industries.

Opus Global has a primary listing on the Budapest Stock Exchange and is a constituent of the BUX Index. Since 2018, Opus Global has been a continuous member of the MSCI Emerging Markets Small Cap, and MSCI ACWI Small Cap indexes, and also member of the Vienna Stock Exchange's CECE index.

== History ==
=== Foundation ===
Since its foundation in 1912, Opus Global has gone through many turning points until it took its current form. Among these, it should be mentioned that when the Opus Global became a member of the issuer circle of the Budapest Stock Exchange, its shares were listed on the BSE from 1998. From 1999 to 2009, a major reorganization program was carried out, as a result of which a holding primarily dealing with the management and asset management of companies of various profiles was created.

=== The last 10 years ===
2017 was a milestone in the life of Opus Global, when major transformations took place in both the ownership and management structure. In the first half of 2017, Lőrinc Mészáros became the majority owner of the company. As a result of the transformation, Opus Global's numbers fundamentally strengthened and entered the Budapest Stock Exchange's premium category, and have been a member of BSE's prominent index baskets.

Opus Global borrowed 130 million euros to buy the gas and electricity distribution firm Titász from MKB Bank.

In order to create market embeddedness and investor confidence, Opus Global merged with Konzum Nyrt. in 2019, a merger of two public issuers was unprecedented in the history of the Hungarian stock market. As a result of the capital increases, Opus Global became the Budapest Stock Exchange's 5th largest company, with several industrial and manufacturing companies from the main sectors of the Hungarian economy in its portfolio.

In 2023's first quarter Opus Global reported considerable improvement on bottom line on a consolidated level for the first quarter. Although it is not a surprise that the company faced a major increase in (especially material related) costs, operating income could eventually outperform this large increase, which could therefore translate into a meaningful improvement on EBIT. Important to mention is that the company has reported that no significant acquisitions took place that would blur data comparability.

== Shareholder structure ==
As of June 2023, Opus Global's shareholder structure is:

- 48.94% - Free Float
- 22.86% - Lőrinc Mészáros
- 21.68% - KONZUM PE Private Equity Fund
- 6.52% - Own Shares

== Awards ==
- Budapest Stock Exchange's Capital increase of the Year (2018, 2019)
- Construction Industry Excellence Award (2019)
- Hungarian Product Grand Prix (2001, 2004, 2006, 2009, 2010, 2013)
- Agricultural Investment of the Year (2019)
- Hungarian Agricultural Quality Award (2020)

== See also ==
- Economy of Hungary
- Industry of Hungary
- List of companies of Hungary
- List of companies based in Budapest
