= Magyar Telekom =

Hungarian telecommunications service

Magyar Telekom Nyrt.
- Company type: Public Subsidiary
- Traded as: BPSE: MTELEKOM; BUX Component; CETOP20 Component
- Industry: Telecommunications
- Headquarters: Budapest, Hungary
- Area served: Central and Eastern Europe
- Key people: Rékasi Tibor (CEO)
- Products: Fixed Telephony, Mobile Telephony, Broadband Internet, IT Services, Networking Solutions, Digital TV
- Revenue: HUF 746,669 million (2022)
- Operating income: HUF 109,178 million (2022)
- Net income: HUF 62,954 million (2022)
- Total assets: HUF 1,456,417 million (2022)
- Total equity: HUF 734,776 million (2022)
- Number of employees: 6,711 (2022)
- Parent: Deutsche Telekom (61.39%)
- Subsidiaries: Makedonski Telekom
- Website: www.telekom.hu

Headquarters of Magyar Telekom in Budapest

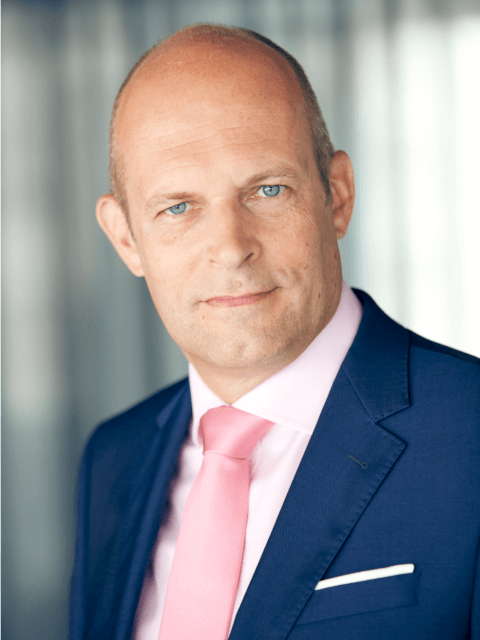
Dr. Robert Hauber, Chairperson of Magyar Telekom's Board since April 2017

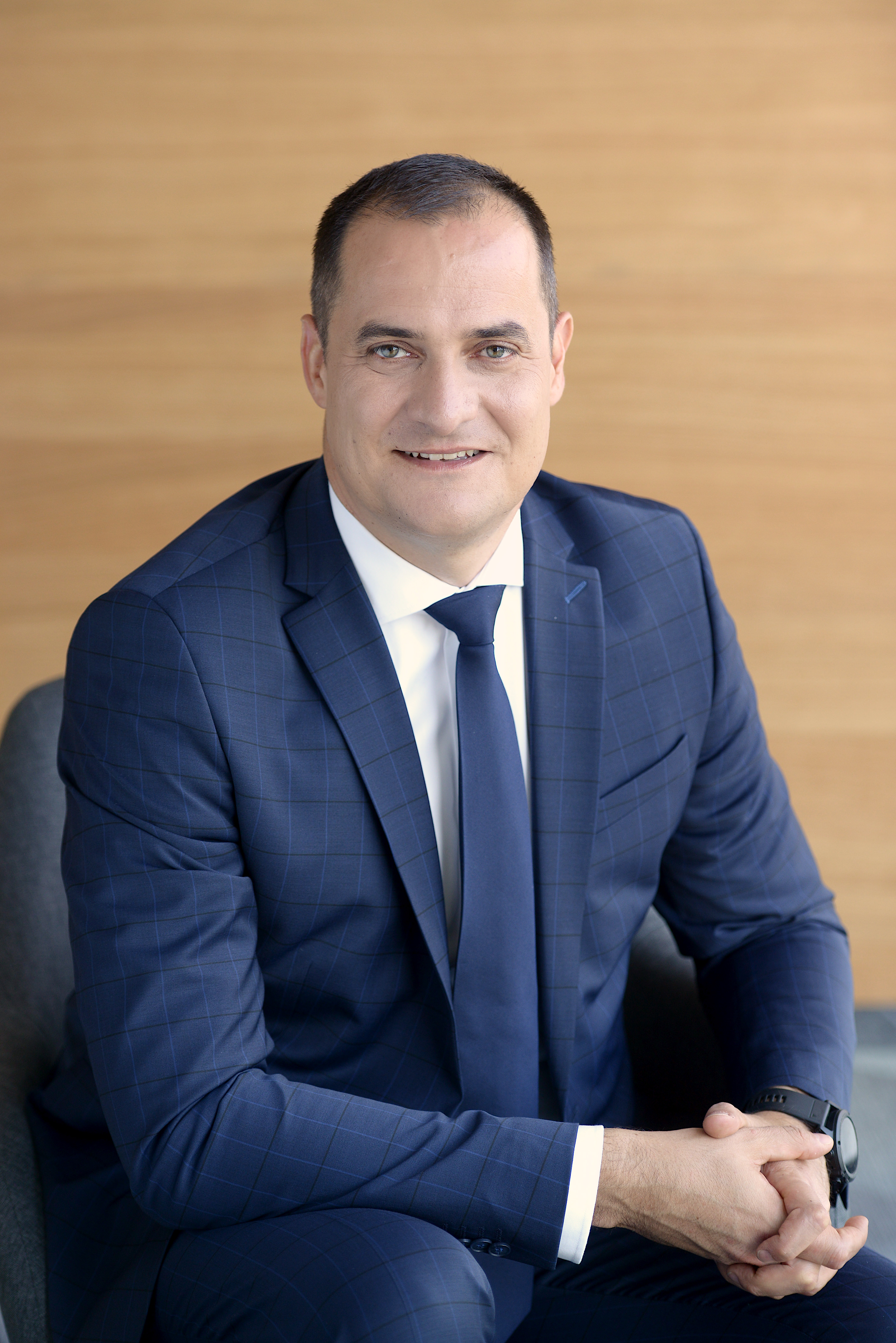
Tibor Rékasi, Magyar Telekom's Chief Executive Officer

Magyar Telekom Nyrt. (officially Magyar Telekom Távközlési Nyilvánosan Működő Részvénytársaság, Magyar Telekom Telecommunications Public Limited Company lit. 'Hungarian Telecom Telecommunications Public Limited Company') is a leading Hungarian telecommunications service provider company. It is a subsidiary of Deutsche Telekom.

Magyar Telekom provides a range of telecommunications and information and communication technology (ICT) services to residential and business customers, including fixed-line and mobile telephony, data transmission, and IT and system integration services under the Telekom brand. Magyar Telekom Nyrt. is the sole owner of Telekom Rendszerintegráció Zrt. and the majority owner of Makedonski Telekom, an integrated telecommunications provider in North Macedonia.

Until 6 May 2005, it was known as Matáv (Magyar Távközlési Rt. – Hungarian Telecommunications PLC). The company was formed under the name of Magyar Távközlési Vállalat (Hungarian Telecommunications Enterprise) in December 1989, when Magyar Posta (Hungarian Post) was split into three separate enterprises. On 31 December 1991, the company was re-structured as a public limited company as Magyar Távközlési Rt.. On 1 July 1993, the Telecommunications Act came into effect, making it possible to privatize the company. The company remained 100% state owned until the end of 1993. At this point, a consortium was formed between Deutsche Telekom and Ameritech, which was named MagyarCom. MagyarCom bought a company share of 30.1% for a price of US$875 million.

== History ==
=== Early years ===
On 31 December 1989, after becoming one of the three sections of the Hungarian Post service area, the Hungarian Telecommunications Company (Matáv) was founded, as telecommunications operator Magyar Telecom Rt. The company was wholly owned by the state until the end of 1993, but became privatized after the Telecommunications Act came into effect 1 July 1993. In 1993, 30.1% ownership of Matáv was purchased by Deutsche Telekom and Ameritech International telecommunications companies, under the new name, MagyarCom Consortium. During the privatization process MagyarCom acquired a majority stake of the company, under a contract signed on 22 December 1995. The effect of the two companies forming a consortium was Central and Eastern Europe's largest privatization, and also the largest foreign investment in Hungary.

=== Deutsche Telekom's majority ===
On 14 November 1997, Matáv share trading began in Budapest and New York City, placing 26.31% of the shares on the market, which was the largest share subscription ever held in Hungary, making Matáv the first Central European company to be listed on the New York Stock Exchange. In the summer of 1999, ÁPV Rt. (Hungary's State Privatization Property Agency) sold the last package of shares of Hungary's 5.75%, but still held the golden share.

On 3 July 2000, Deutsche Telekom acquired SBC's 50% stake in MagyarCom in compliance of their shareholder agreement. As a result of the change in the ownership structure of MagyarCom, Deutsche Telekom's ownership in Matáv increased to 59.52%, the remaining 40.48% public shareholding, while the golden share was owned by Hungary.

=== Internationalization ===
Since 2001, it was possible for Matáv to become an international telecommunications group. The consortium led by Matáv acquired a majority stake in Macedonia's national telecommunications company Makedonski Telekomunikacii (MakTel), which became a consolidated subsidiary of the group. As a further step, Matáv acquired the remaining 50% stake in Emitel Rt.

The group's companies took leading positions in the mobile phone, internet and business data communications markets, with a share of over 80% in the fixed phone market.

A new governance structure of the group was adopted at the end of 2001.

=== Rebranding ===
In 2002, the Matáv Group obtained group-level certification in accordance with ISO 9001:2000, certified by SGS S.A.

Matáv also wanted to lead telecommunications and Internet services in Hungary, as evidenced by the 100,000th ADSL subscription acquired in December 2003. In mobile telephones, number portability was a minor difficulty, but the Westel division of the group solved the problem in 2004.

In March 2004, the group decided to replace the Westel name, which had existed since 1989, and joined the global T-Mobile brand on 1 May 2004. Subsequently, the Matáv Group decided to consolidate and merge, subordinating the structure of the group of companies on 1 January 2005, and then on 6 May all its services and operational organizations under central management and the group of companies. It changed its company name, and from that date, the Magyar Telekom Group operated as a group of "T" brand names.

On 8 November 2005, Magyar Telekom purchased Orbitel (Bulgaria's telecommunications provider), a transaction that ended on 3 February 2006.

The merge caused T-Mobile Magyarország Rt. and Magyar Telekom Rt. to stop existing, and András Sugár, CEO of T-Mobile, resigned. At the same time, Magyar Telekom Távközlési Nyilvánosan Működő Részvénytársaság took over their role on 1 March 2006.

=== 2007 ===
According to the decision of Magyar Telekom's board of directors as approved by the company's General Meeting, T-Online Hungary's Internet access area and the regional fixed line subsidiary Emitel were integrated within Magyar Telekom as of 1 October 2007. T-Online Hungary's web and content services business area continued to operate under the name Origo Media and Communications as a Magyar Telekom Group subsidiary.

On 25 September 2007, Magyar Telekom's board of directors took a decision to change the management and organization structure of the company, in order to raise the standard of services, improve cost efficiency and exploit new, innovative service and business opportunities. The decision to change the organization model shifted the focus from technology to the demands of customer segments. Consequently, the new management structure of Magyar Telekom determines the operating model of the Group on the basis of customer segments. The new management structure, developed in order to reach the strategic objectives and based on customer segments, was implemented on January 1, 2008.

=== 2008 ===
From January 2008 the organization of T-Systems business unit was simplified through integration of subsidiaries in an effort to provide better service to customers and increase efficiency. The number of T-Systems subsidiaries was reduced from six to two, while retaining the flexibility and customer focus.

As part of Magyar Telekom's integration processes, iWiW and Adnetwork Online Marketing merged into Origo 30 June 2008.

Following the board of directors decision in June 2008, Magyar Telekom introduced the T-Home brand in September, which replaced the T-Com, T-Online and T-Kábel brands and has become the single brand representing fixed line communications and entertainment services at home. The corporate “T” brand has been renewed simultaneously, and it functions as an umbrella brand for the brands offered by T-Home, T-Mobile and the T-Systems. Magyar Telekom's new slogan “Life is for sharing” was also introduced and is used both by T-Home and T-Mobile. The rebranding has created a simpler brand structure, easier to identify for customers. Along with the introduction of T-Home brand, we also repositioned Magyar Telekom as Hungary's only “double triple-play” provider, which, through T-Home and T-Mobile, offers Internet, television and telephone services on the fixed line and mobile networks alike, at home and on the move.

=== 2009 ===
According to the decision of Magyar Telekom's board of directors as approved by the company's extraordinary General Meeting on June 29, 2009, the merger of cable TV subsidiaries T-Kabel Hungary and Del-Vonal into Magyar Telekom was completed 30 September 2009.

=== 2010 ===
In April 2010 the board of directors made changes effective July 1 to the management structure of the company to improve its efficiency in responding to changing market and economic conditions.

Magyar Telekom withdrew from the New York Stock Exchange on 12 November 2010 to simplify the structure of financial reporting and reduce administrative costs.

=== 2012 ===
==== 4G technology in Hungary ====
On 1 January, Telekom was the first telecommunications company in Hungary to launch its 4G/LTE-based mobile Internet service, which provided full outdoor 4G coverage of Budapest and 4G mobile internet to almost 27% of the country's population.

At its meeting held in June, Magyar Telekom's board of directors approved the mid- and long-term strategic direction of the company's operations. One of the first steps is the establishment of a new management structure. The changes, started from January 2013, will enable Magyar Telekom to exploit the new, innovative service and business opportunities by responding more flexibly to changes in customer demand and to market challenges. The company's new organizational structure is also designed to enable Magyar Telekom to serve its customers in a high-quality, state-of-the-art and efficient way. In this framework the executive positions chief commercial officer residential and chief commercial officer SMB have been created to head the management areas in charge of serving the respective customer segments.

=== 2013 ===
In September, Magyar Telekom's frequency usage rights in the 1800 MHz and in the 900 MHz frequency band have been extended until 2022 by way of an amendment to authority contract with the President of the National Media and Infocommunications Authority. For Magyar Telekom, the amendment has secured the foundations for providing high quality mobile services in the future.

Magyar Telekom won the Excellence in Customer Service Award of 2013 in the telephone customer service (call center) enterprise category in October. With this Telekom proved to be Hungary's best in call center services among enterprises.

Magyar Telekom acquired nine cable networks in Hungary during the year.

=== 2014 ===
The Government of Hungary and Magyar Telekom signed a partnership agreement in February. The Government and the market-leading telecom group have established a long-term cooperation for the country's digital development. The goal is to establish a Digital Hungary, through providing broadband Internet for all, promoting digital literacy and increasing the competitiveness of businesses.

=== 2015 ===
Magyar Telekom and Telenor Hungary entered an agreement to jointly develop and operate their 4G networks, and Telekom increased its nationwide residential 4G coverage to 97% i.e. almost complete by the end of 2015.

=== 2016 ===
In February Magyar Telekom's board of directors decided to keep Christopher Mattheisen as CEO until 31 May 2019.

Magyar Telekom became the named sponsor of the Veszprém handball team. According to the agreement from the 2016/2017 championship season the teams of the Veszprém Handball Team Zrt., from the U10 age group to the adult team, will be called as Telekom Veszprém Handball Team in all domestic and international championships.

=== 2017 ===
On 11 January, Tibor Rékasi was appointed as Magyar Telekom's chief residential commercial officer. On April 1, Kim Kyllesbech Larsen became Magyar Telekom's Chief Technical and IT Officer, and on May 15, Zsuzsanna Friedl became Chief People Officer.Robert Hauber, Deutsche Telekom's Senior Vice President Finance Europe, was appointed as chairman of Magyar Telekom's board of directors.

Magyar Telekom signed a share sale agreement with Hrvatski Telekom d.d. to transfer its majority stake in Crnogorski Telekom. As a result of the transaction Magyar Telekom's majority stake (76.53%) in Crnogorski AD. was transferred to Hrvatski Telekom d.d. for a total of 123.5 million EUR.

Magyar Telekom was the first mobile operator in Hungary to launch voice services on the 4G network. The 4G Voice service has the advantage of providing an uninterrupted 4G data connection even during calls.

Magyar Telekom began building a 5G test network at the automotive test track in Zalaegerszeg.

=== 2018 ===
Mattheisen resigned from Magyar Telekom on 1 July, with Rékasi succeeding him, and Melinda Szabó became Magyar Telekom's chief residential commercial officer.

Telekom was the first company on the Hungarian market to enable the use of embedded SIM cards (eSIM) on its network. It also introduced MultiSIM, which allows customers to use both mobile internet and voice services on multiple SIMs with a single subscription. MultiSIM supports both traditional SIM and eSIM cards.

Magyar Telekom was the first in Hungary to present a 5G network operating under real conditions at its headquarters in Krisztina Körút, Budapest.

According to GKI Digital's market analysis Magyar Telekom was the largest mobile handset and tablet supplier on the Hungarian online retail market in 2018.

Between 2014 and 2018 the company spent nearly HUF 240 billion in Hungary to develop the infrastructure of its fixed and mobile networks.

=== 2019 ===
At the end of January, Magyar Telekom launched its first standard 5G station in the center of Zalaegerszeg. The gigabit speed test network was implemented as a standard 5G system and was using commercially mature 5G network equipment.

Magyar Telekom extended its sponsorship contract with Telekom Veszprém men's handball team. According to the agreement Telekom continued to support the adult and junior teams for another three years, until the end of the 2021–2022 championship season.

On October 1, 2019, Lubor Zatko was appointed Chief Technical and IT Officer of Magyar Telekom.

Magyar Telekom's intensive network development continued in 2019 and as a result the operator covered more than 1.7 million access points with its gigabit speed network, either on fibre and cable technology by September.

Magyar Telekom started the transition to an agile way of working in 2019. The aim of the corporate-level agile transformation was to respond more quickly and effectively to customer needs and the changing market environment.

=== 2020 ===
On March 1, Darja Dodonova, former vice president of Europe segment Technology Controlling at Deutsche Telekom, became the chief financial officer of Magyar Telekom.

Magyar Telekom's board of directors extended Rékasi's contract as CEO for until June 30, 2024. On November 2, Gábor Gonda became CEO of T-Systems Hungary Zrt. and a member of Magyar Telekom's executive management.

Magyar Telekom was successful in the auction for frequency usage rights for 5G and mobile broadband services and launched its commercial 5G service in April. By the end of August, the service reached another milestone with dozens of new stations connected in 23 municipalities - Budapest, Budaörs, Zalaegerszeg, Debrecen, Kecskemét, Szeged and parts of Szombathely, as well as in 16 localities around Lake Balaton.

=== 2021 ===
Magyar Telekom acquired frequency usage rights in the auction for the 900 MHz and 1800 MHz frequency bands.

Based on the company's 2020 sustainability results, Magyar Telekom was nominated among the best performing companies in the telecommunications sector by ISS Corporate Solutions.

Based on PwC Hungary's annual research, Magyar Telekom won the Most Attractive Workplace Award in the telecom sector for the fourth year in a row in 2021.

=== 2022 ===
Magyar Telekom renewed its sponsorship contract with the Telekom Veszprém men's handball team. According to the agreement, Telekom continues to support the men's adult and junior teams of the Veszprém club for another four years, until the end of the 2025–2026 championship season.

Magyar Telekom switched off its 3G network on 1 July 2022.

=== 2023 ===
From February 1, 2023, Magyar Telekom provides new IT and telecommunications services from a single source for its customers of medium and large companies. Magyar Telekom's medium-sized and large company customers can use the telecommunications and IT services under the Telekom brand name, in the form of a monthly fee, from one source, from one service provider. The unique system integration needs of domestic companies are supported in the usual form, in a separate company, by Telekom Rendszerintegráció Zrt.

== Controversies ==
In July 2017, T-Systems Hungary, a subsidiary of Magyar Telekom, launched an online ticket service for BKK, the unified transport operator of Budapest, Hungary. The application allegedly contained multiple security bugs. T-Systems Hungary reported online attacks on the application to the local authorities. One major bug was reported to BKK by an 18-year-old student, who was later detained by the police in the middle of the night, causing a public outcry, as it was revealed that the detention was ordered after the report by T-Systems. Many comments and negative ratings were added to T-Systems and BKK's social media pages.
