= MOL (company) =

Hungarian Oil and Gas Public Limited Company

MOL Plc.

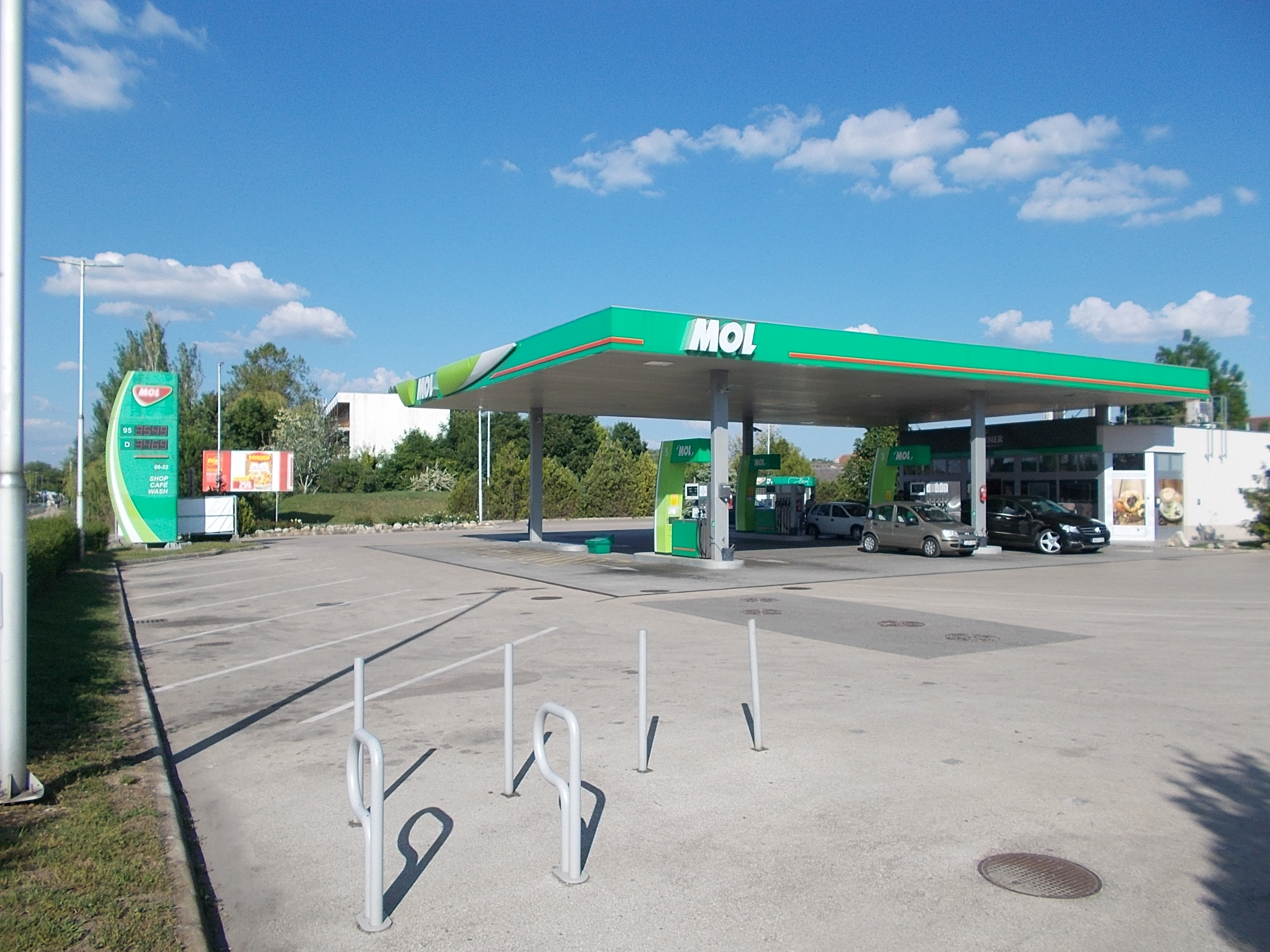
- Type: Public
- Traded as: BPSE: MOL; WSE: MOL; BUX Component; CETOP20 Component
- Industry: Oil and gas Retail; Mobility
- Founded: 1957 (National Oil and Gas Trust); 1 October 1991 (current company)
- Headquarters: Budapest, Hungary
- Area served: Worldwide
- Key people: Zsolt Hernádi (Chairman & CEO); József Molnár (GCEO)
- Products: Oil and gas exploration and production, natural gas, oil and LNG trading and transportation, oil refining and chemicals
- Services: Bicycle sharing Carsharing; Fuel stations Fleet management
- Revenue: ▼US$ 24.7 billion (2025)
- Operating income: ▼US$ 1.2 billion (2025)
- Net income: ▼US$ 810 million (2025)
- Total assets: US$ 23.3 billion (2025)
- Total equity: ▼US$ 12.9 billion (2025)
- Number of employees: 28,743 (2025)
- Subsidiaries: INA; Slovnaft; MOL Group Italy
- Website: molgroup.info mol.hu

MOL Plc. (Hungarian: Magyar OLaj- és Gázipari Részvénytársaság, lit. 'Hungarian Oil and Gas Public Limited Company'), also known as MOL Group, is a Hungarian multinational oil and gas company headquartered in Budapest, Hungary. Members of MOL Group include among others the Croatian and Slovak formerly state-owned oil and gas companies, INA and Slovnaft. MOL is Hungary's second most profitable enterprise, with net profits of $810 million in 2025. The company is also the third most valuable company in Central and Eastern Europe and placed 402 on the Fortune Global 500 list of the world's largest companies in 2013.

As of August 2026, the largest shareholder is the Hungarian State with 15.24%, ahead of the Maecenas Universitatis Corvini Foundation with 10%, MOL Plc. SESOP Organization with 7.95%, OTP Bank with 4.91% and ING Bank with 3.75%. Over 45% of shares are free floated.

MOL is active in exploration and production, refining, distribution and marketing, petrochemicals, power generation, trading and retail. As of 2025, MOL has operations in over 30 countries worldwide, employs 28,743 people and has 2,400 service stations in ten countries. MOL's downstream operations in Central and Eastern Europe manufacture and sell products such as fuels, lubricants, additives and petrochemicals. The company's most significant areas of operations are Central and Eastern Europe, Southern Europe, North Sea, Middle East, Africa, Pakistan, Russia and Kazakhstan.

MOL has a primary listing on the Budapest Stock Exchange and is a constituent of the BUX Index. In September 2025, it was the second largest company listed on the Budapest Stock Exchange. By January 2026, it had a market capitalization of $7.7 billion. MOL also has a secondary listing on the Warsaw Stock Exchange.

== History ==
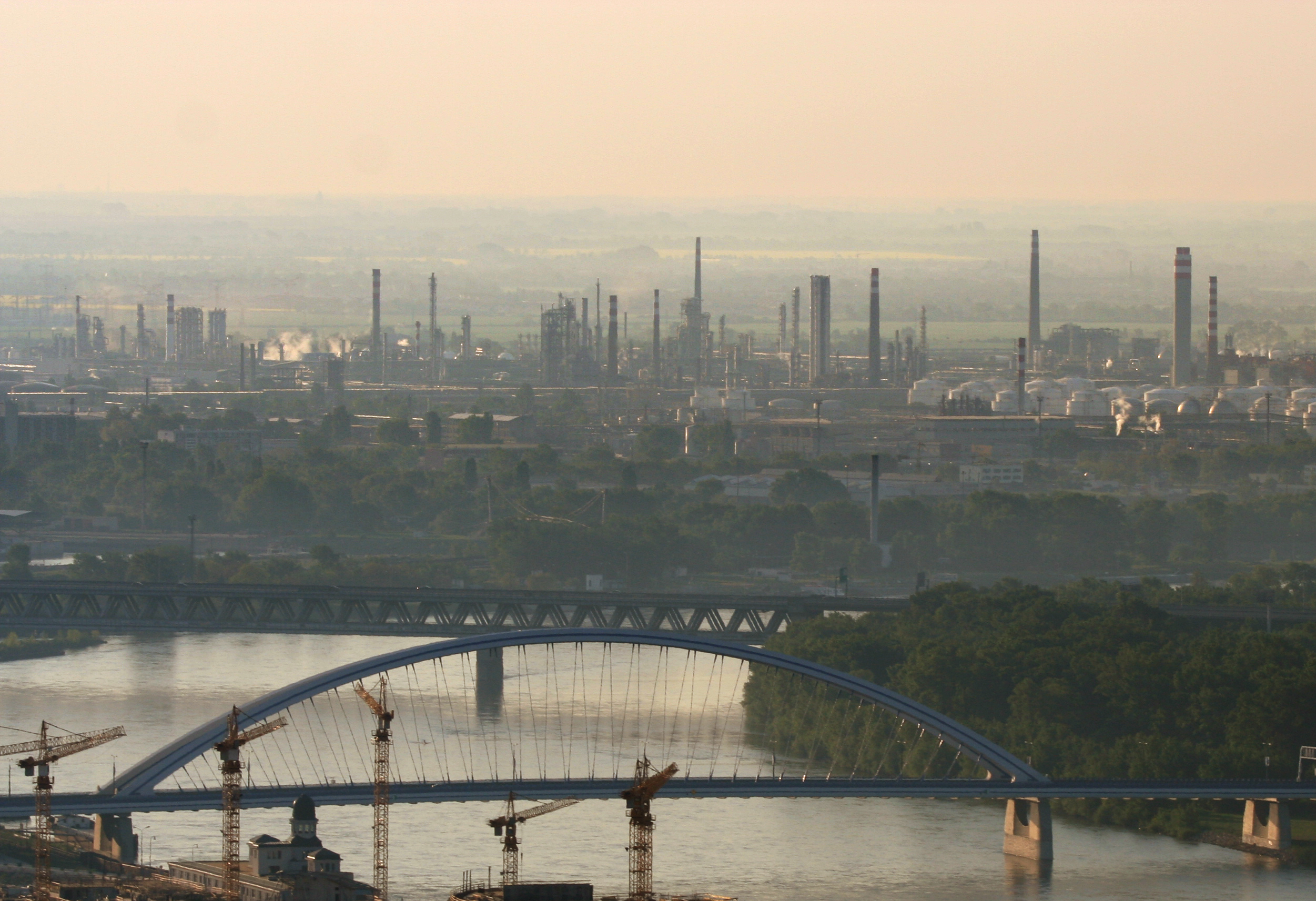
MOL subsidiary Slovnaft oil refinery in Bratislava

=== Foundation (1994–1995) ===
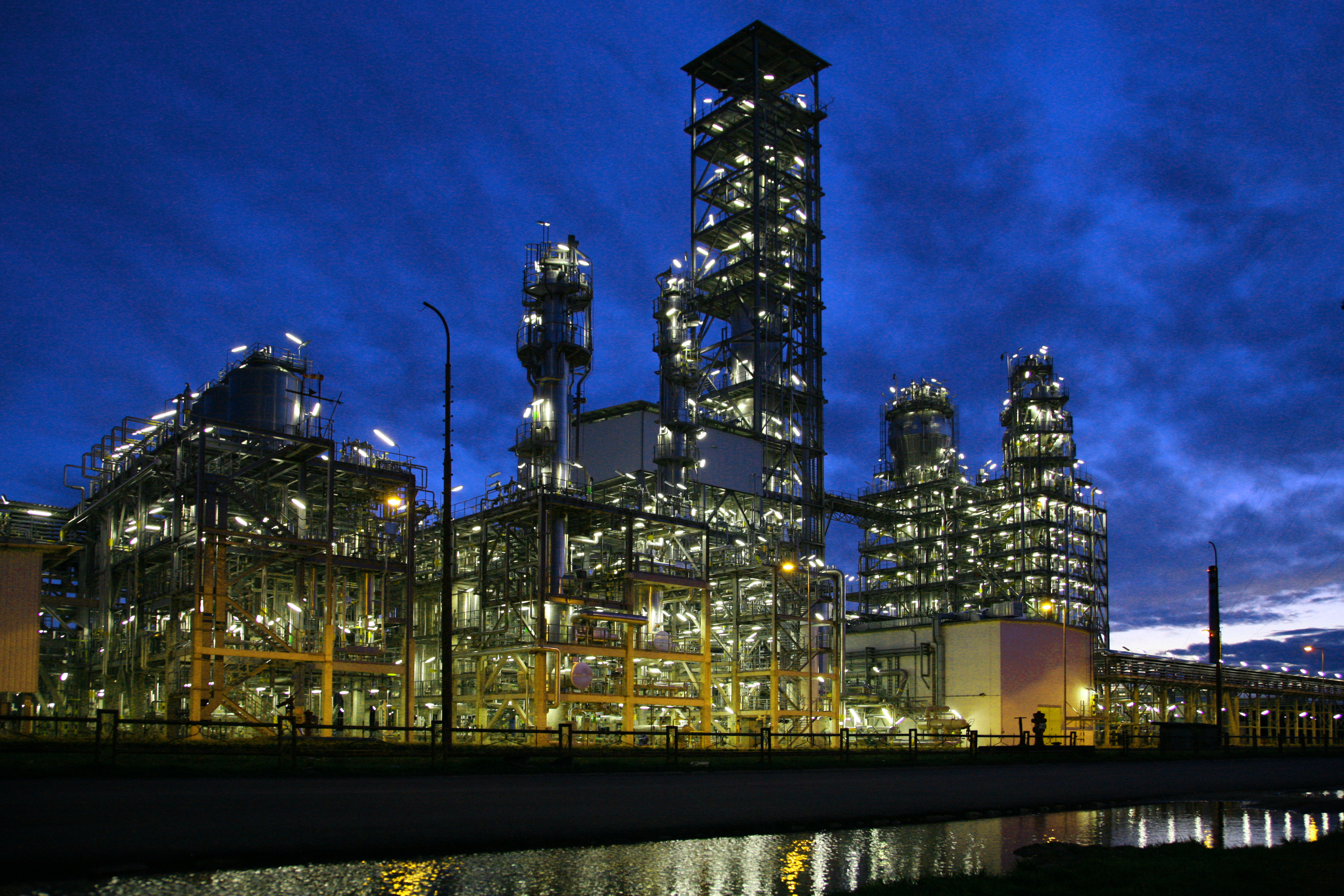
New polypropylene plant of Slovnaft in Bratislava

On 1 October 1991, MOL was established as a legal successor, merging nine former members of the National Oil and Gas Trust, which had been established in 1957. By 1995, the actual integration of companies was completed, and the previously separated entities started to operate within one joint organization. MOL decided on a privatization strategy, in order to respond to international market, political and legal challenges, which the company was facing following the turmoil of the end of the Soviet Union.

=== Regional expansion (1995–2001) ===
In 1995, the company opened filling stations in Transylvania, Romania. In 2000 it acquired a 36% stake in Slovnaft, Slovakia's national oil company. The company thus became the first oil company in Central Europe to establish a cross-border partnership and also launched a new business branch by procuring 32.9% of Hungary's petrochemical company TVK.

In 1999, MOL entered Pakistan, becoming the operator of TAL Block (with 8.42% stake in production), one of the largest hydrocarbon producing blocks of the country.

=== International expansion (2002–2007) ===
As a result of the 2002 INA Privatization Act, the open public tender for the privatization of a 25%+1 share stake in INA, Croatia's national oil company, was launched in May 2002. MOL won the tender with a bid of $505 million against OMV's offer of $420 million.

By 2004, MOL had fully acquired, in several steps, Slovakia's national refiner Slovnaft, and Hungary's leading producer of ethylene and polypropylene TVK, over which MOL gained control with increasing their stake to 34.5% in 2001. Subsequently, MOL further increased its stake in TVK to 86.56% in 2006. In 2015, MOL then raised its shareholding in TVK to 100%.

Between 2003 and 2005, MOL had acquired all Shell filling stations in Romania. In 2004, MOL entered the Austrian market by purchasing a fuel storage facility in Korneuburg, and a year later acquired the Roth filling station chain. In August 2007, MOL purchased Italiana Energia e Servizi S.p.A. (IES), owner of the Mantua refinery and a chain of 165 retail stations in Italy.

=== International expansion II (2007–2016) ===
In 2007, MOL entered the Kurdistan Region of Iraq, where its subsidiary MOL Kalegran owns 20% in Shaikan PSC. Further in 2009, MOL acquired a 10% stake in the Pearl Petroleum consortium (Pearl) from Crescent Petroleum and Dana Gas PJSC.

In November 2007, MOL reported a new regional initiative to create a joint regional gas pipeline system called New European Transmission System (NETS). On 20 December 2007, MOL announced a strategic cooperation with Czech power utility CEZ. The joint venture with CEZ focuses on gas-fired power generation and related gas infrastructure in Central and Southeastern Europe, first launching two 800 MW power plants in Hungary and Slovakia. After selling 7% of its shares to CEZ within the scopes of a strategic partnership, MOL announced on 10 March 2008 the sale of an 8% stake to the Oman Oil Company for the same reason.

On 9 May 2008, MOL signed an agreement to acquire a 35% interest in a block in India operated by the Indian ONGC. In the same year MOL further acquired 22.16% of INA's shares through its general public offer on the Zagreb Stock Exchange.

On 24 May 2011, the second Orbán-cabinet bought the Russian Surgutneftegas's shares, thus the Hungarian state acquired 21.2% of the shares within the company. In 2012, MOL began installing EV chargers at their gas stations. By 2025, MOL reported a total of 296 chargers across its stations.

In late 2013, MOL entered the North Sea by acquiring Wintershall's portfolio, which included a mix of producing fields and undeveloped projects. It also acquired a position in the Scott hub in the central North Sea. MOL further expanded its exploration portfolio by entering Norway in 2015, after acquiring Ithaca Petroleum Norge.

On May 8, 2014, MOL announced the acquisition of the Italian Eni's subsidiaries in the Czech Republic, Slovakia and Romania, including the retail network of 208 petrol stations previously operated under the Agip brand. The transaction also included the takeover of Eni's wholesale interests in the Czech Republic, Slovakia and Romania. In the Czech Republic, MOL's retail market share exceeded 10 percent thanks to 125 new gas stations and 24 Slovnaft and 125 PAP Oil filling stations, also belonging to the group. With 274 service stations, the MOL Group is the second largest retailer of fuel in the country. In Slovakia, 253 petrol stations were already part of the entire network, with 41 filling stations purchased at the time. In Romania, the existing network expanded by 42 wells, adding 189 items, accounting for 12% of retail sales.

=== Diversification (2016–2020) ===
In 2016, MOL announced its long-term strategy "MOL 2030". According to the company, its integrated upstream-downstream business model would continue to provide stable and robust profitability for the next 10–15 years, but new investments are seen to be essential for MOL's future. As part of the strategy, the company intends to diversify the classical Oil & Gas business and develop into the region's leading chemical and consumer goods and services company.

Through 2030, MOL scheduled investments of US$4.5 billion to expand its petrochemical business and to extend away from the commodity segment into higher value-added chemical products. One of the first projects following the new strategy was the Polyol chemical project. In September 2018, MOL reached final investment on the project and signed engineering, procurement and construction (EPC) contracts with ThyssenKrupp.

The company formed a partnership for plastic recycling with German APK in 2018, and in 2019 acquired Aurora, a German recycled plastic compounding company.

In 2017, MOL launched fleet management, e-mobility and car sharing ventures.

In September 2019, MOL Serbia opened a new fuel storage depot in Sremski Karlovci. The compound is MOL's largest investment into Serbia over the last 15 years. In November 2019, MOL signed an agreement with Chevron, acquiring their 9.57% interest in the Azeri-Chirag-Gunashli (ACG) oil field and an 8.9% stake in the Baku-Tbilisi-Ceyhan (BTC) pipeline. The pipeline transports crude oil from ACG to the Mediterranean port of Ceyhan. The total transaction was valued at $1.57 billion. In November 2019, MOL Group announced it had acquired 100% shareholding in German plastic compounder company Aurora.

In 2014 as a strategic goal, MOL started investigating the ways of diversifying its crude oil supply and to adapt its refineries to process non-Russian alternative crude oil, in order to reach greater flexibility. Until 2022 MOL invested more than US$170 million on building up the alternative logistics on the Adria pipeline. This allows more seaborne deliveries to supply the Duna and Slovnaft refineries in Hungary and Slovakia. Due to the crude diversification efforts, Duna refinery can currently process about 35% of non-REB feedstock, mixed in with Urals crude. The Russian invasion of Ukraine has accelerated this process of planning. MOL needs an investment-cycle of up to $700million and at least 2–4 years to be able to switch to 100% alternative crude processing.

=== International expansion (2021–present) ===
In June 2021, MOL Group reached an agreement to acquire OMV's 92.25% stake in OMV Slovenija d.o.o., the Slovenian arm of Austrian oil and gas giant OMV AG for €301million. The agreement made MOL the second biggest fuel supplier in Slovenia. It was approved by the European Commission in 2023 on the condition that MOL would sell 39 gas stations to Shell. MOL expanded into Poland in December 2022, by completing the purchase of 417 Lotos gas stations, which were sold as part of an regulatory requirement for PKN Orlen's takeover of Lotos. The purchase made MOL the third largest operator of gas stations in Poland at the time. By June 2024, MOL had rebranded all 273 company operated stations in Poland, while also expanding its Fresh Corner shops. By December 2025, the total number of stations sunk to 370, which represented a 7% market share.

In October 2019, the foundation stone for a polyol complex in Tiszaújváros, Hungary, was laid by Zsolt Hernádi, Ferenc Koncz, Sami Pelkonen and Mihály Varga. The €1.3 billion complex opened in 2024 with an annual production capacity of 200,000 tonnes of polyol. In the same year, MOL started producing green hydrogen at a 10-MW facility at the Százhalombatta refinery. The facility can produce up to 1,600 tonnes of hydrogen per year, which is used primarily in fuel production. In November 2024, MOL Fleet Solution and the Mercarius company merged to form MOL Mercarius, a fleet management firm.

MOL announced in 2024 to invest over $4 billion in the renewable energy and low carbon sector with an aim of making production carbon-neutral by 2050 as part of their "Shape Tomorrow" strategy.

In January 2026, it was announced that MOL Group had signed a heads of agreement to acquire Gazprom Neft’s 56.15 per cent stake in Naftna Industrija Srbije for an undisclosed sum. The transaction would give MOL control of Serbia's sole oil refinery at Pančevo, subject to regulatory approvals and the conclusion of a final sale and purchase agreement. In July 2026, MOL bought BG Cyprus from Shell for $720 million. The agreement included a 35% interest in the Aphrodite gas field.

== Corporate affairs ==
=== Organizational structure ===
MOL has multiple subsidiaries across all areas of its business operations. Its most important subsidiaries include Slovnaft, INA and MOL Group Italy. In November 2025, MOL's board of directors agreed to restructure the company to a holding-group.

=== Leadership structure ===
MOL Group's chief governing body is the board of directors, which has 10 members, out of which three are executive and seven are non-executive. The three executive members of the board are its Chairman Zsolt Hernádi, who is chief executive officer, József Molnár, Group Chief Executive Officer and Oszkár Világi, Group Innovative Businesses and Services Executive Vice President. The supervisory board is led by Zoltán Áldott, who is also the chairman of the supervisory board of Slovnaft.

=== Shareholder structure ===
As of August 31, 2026, MOL's shareholder structure was as follows:

- 29,59% – Foreign investors (mainly institutional)
- 11.41% – Domestic institutional investors
- 15.24% – Hungarian State
- 10.00% – Maecenas Universitatis Corvini Foundation
- 7.95% – MOL Plc. SESOP Organization
- 5.41% – Domestic private investors
- 4.91% – OTP Bank Plc.
- 3.75% – ING Bank N.V.
- 3.62% – UniCredit Bank AG
- 7.32% – MOL Plc. (treasury shares)
- 0.81% – Commerzbank AG

=== MOL campus ===
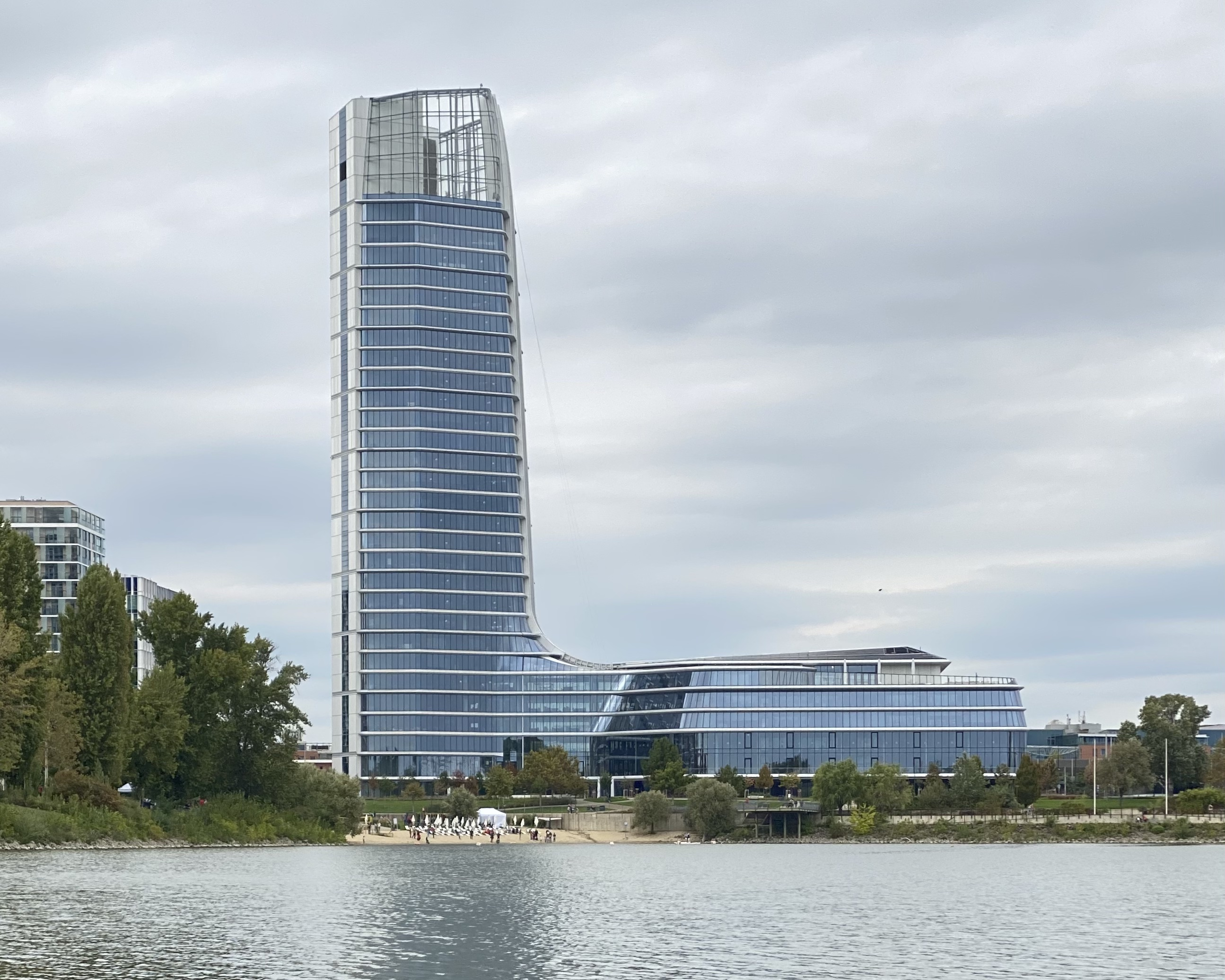
MOL Campus

In 2017, MOL announced the relocation of their corporate headquarters, which are based in various buildings throughout Budapest. The complex consists of a 120m tower, connected podium, buildings and outside spaces, which are designed by Foster + Partners. The campus spans 86,000 sqm at the bank of the Danube and accommodate up to 2,500 people. The tower is the highest building in Budapest.

In June 2019, MOL revealed first interior design visualizations, that were created by the Berlin-based interior design company KINZO. In December 2022, MOL Campus was opened.

== Operations ==
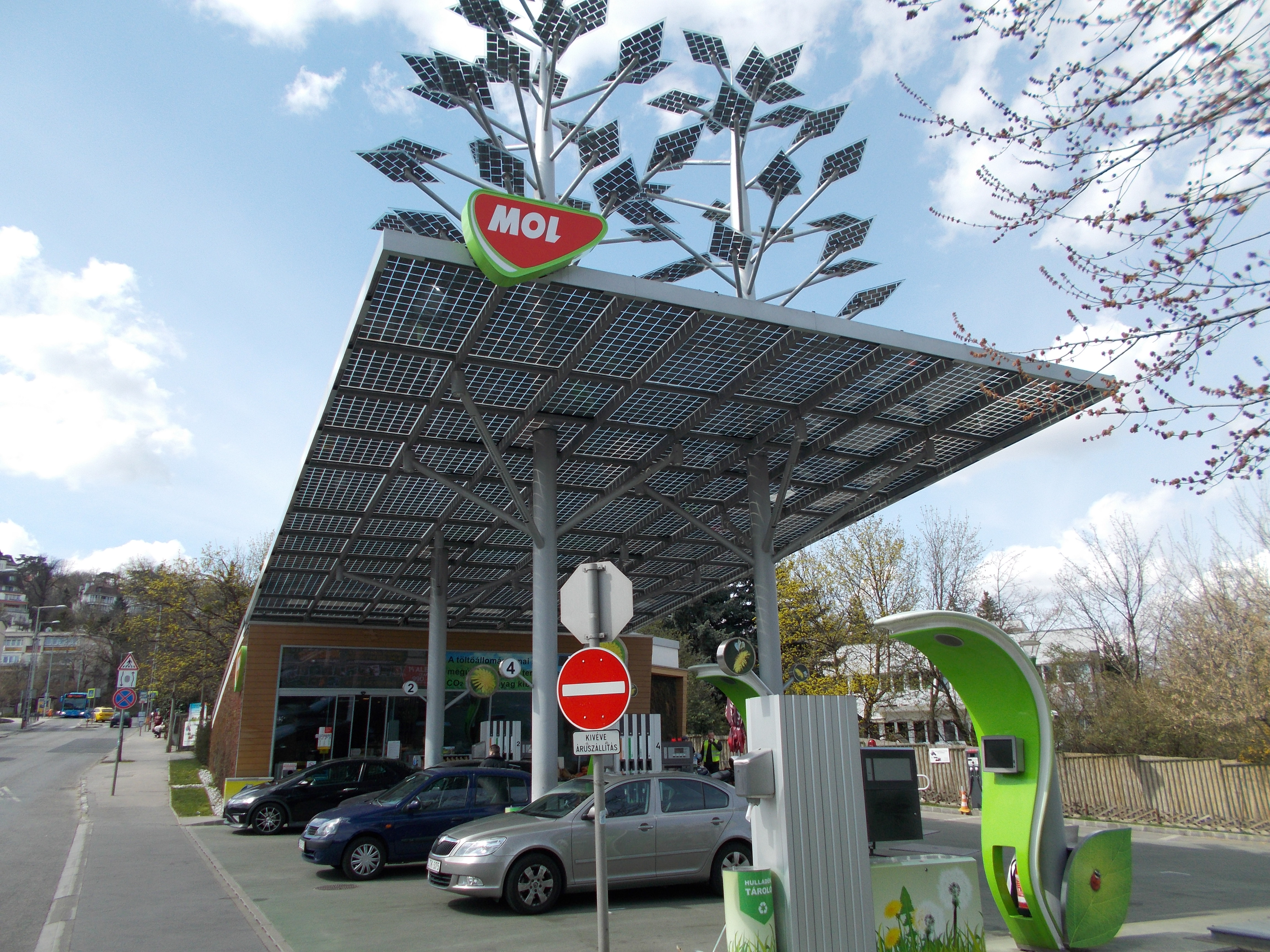
MOL Eco solar powered filling station in Budapest, Hungary

=== International upstream operations ===
MOL Group has a current Upstream presence in 13 countries with production activities in 8. Besides Central and Eastern Europe (Hungary and Croatia), its core regions, MOL has a presence and partnerships in the CIS region (Russia, Kazakhstan), the Middle East, Africa and Pakistan as well as the North Sea region (UK, Norway). The group's total oil and gas reserves stood at 356 million barrels (56.6 million cubic metres) of oil equivalent at the end of 2017 and the daily average hydrocarbon production is 109 thousand barrels (17.3 thousand cubic metres) per day of oil equivalent.

MOL derives nearly three-quarters of its oil and gas production from Hungary and Croatia.

The company has a 20% interest in the Catcher area oil and gas block in the North Sea, in company with Premier Oil (50%) and Cairn Energy (30%). In June 2014, the UK Department of Energy and Climate Change gave final approval for the £1 billion development. First oil was achieved from the field's FPSO (Floating Production Storage and Offloading) in December 2017. In November 2022, MOL sold the stake alongside its 50% stake in Scolty and Crathes and its 21,8% stake in Scott.

Norway is part of in MOL Group's portfolio. The company entered Norway in 2015, after acquiring Ithaca Petroleum Norge, and is present in three of the North Sea's core areas (Central Graben South, South Viking Graben and Northern North Sea). In late 2018, MOL Norge started its first operated drilling in the Oppdal/Driva prospect. In 2025, MOL announced an agreement with the Azerbaijani state-owned company SOCAR for the exploration, development, and production of an area in the Shamakhi-Gobustan region, in which MOL will be the operator and hold a 65% stake.

MOL has foreign exploration licences in (with date of announcement):

- Yemen, Exploration Blocks '48' and '49', 2002
- Kazakhstan, Federovskoye Block, 2004; North Karpovsky, 2012
- Croatia and Hungary, Slatina and Zaláta, 2006
- Russia, Baituganskoe Oilfield, Surgut-7 block and Matjushkinsky block 2006–2007
- Cameroon, Ngosso Permit Block, 2007
- Iraq, Akri Bijeel Block, 2007

MOL has foreign production facilities in (with date of announcement):

- Russia, Zapadno-Malobalyk oil field (with Yukos, later Russneft) 2002
- Pakistan, Tal Block, 2004

=== Downstream operations ===
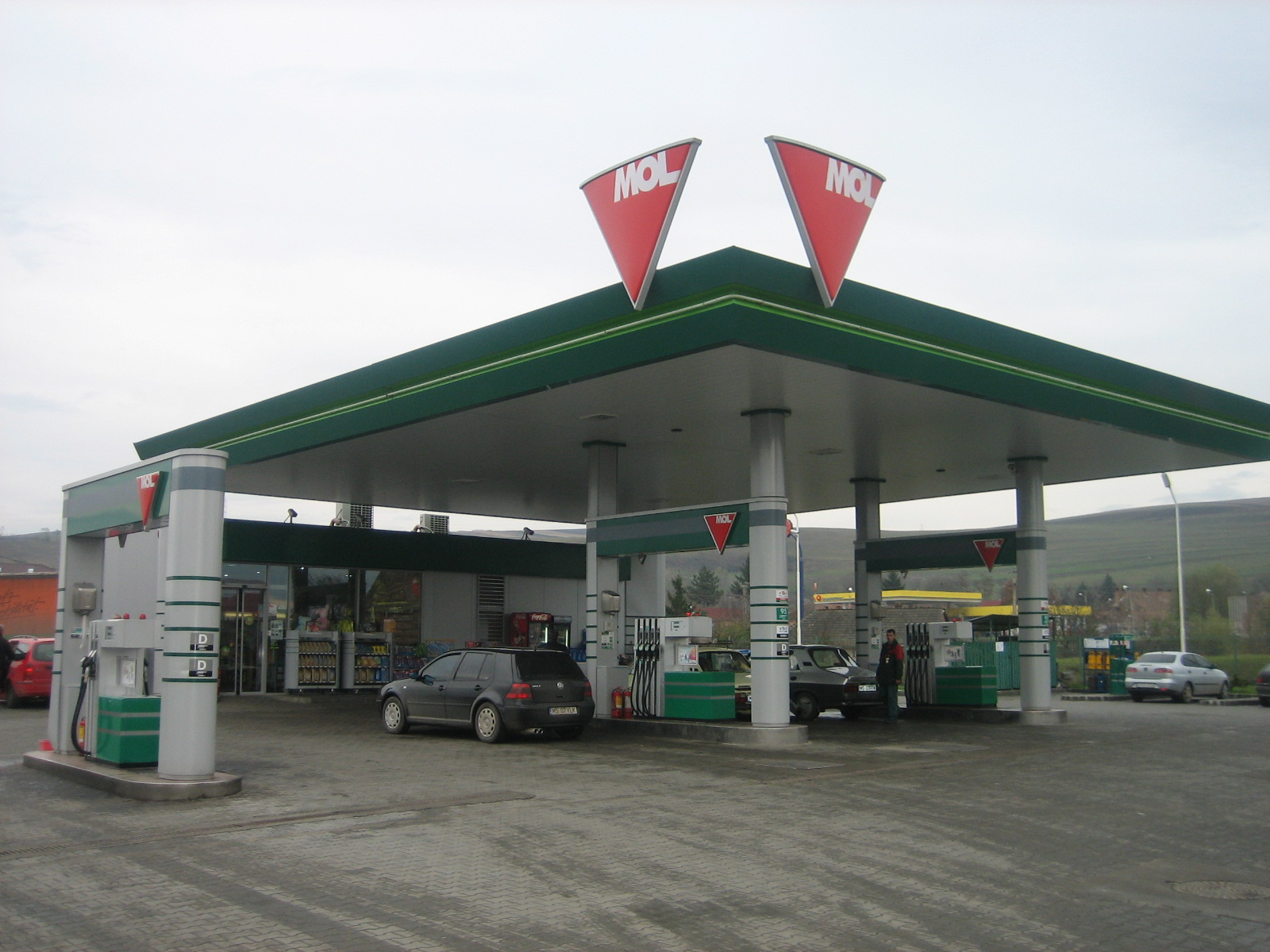
MOL fuel station in Transylvania, Romania

MOL Group operates assets with a total of 20.9 mtpa refining and 2.2 mtpa petrochemicals capacity. Its downstream asset base includes 6 production units: 4 refineries and 2 petrochemical sites, and an extended regional logistics and wholesales network as an integrated value chain. Its refineries at Százhalombatta, Hungary and Bratislava, Slovakia, are among the most profitable ones in Europe, with Nelson complexity indexes of 10.6 and 11.5 respectively.

MOL also produces and sells petrochemicals worldwide and is a leading petrochemical company in the Central Eastern Europe region. Its products are sold in more than 40 countries. MOL's petrochemical portfolio consists of high-quality polyolefin products (high- and low-density polyethylene, polypropylene) as well as butadiene.

As part of its 2030 strategy, MOL targets a gradual increase of the share of valuable non-motor fuel products to above 50% by 2030 from below 30% currently. MOL intends to increase the feedstock for its petrochemical plants, whilst also taking advantage of the growing demand for profitable products as jet fuel, lubricants and base oils.

In 2015, MOL and Transpetrol AS finished a capacity expansion of the Adria oil pipeline between Százhalombatta, Hungary, and Ipolyság, Slovakia, increasing the capacity by 2.5 million tons/year to a total of 6 million tons/year. At the same time, the pipeline section in Hungary leading to Slovakia also had its capacity increased to 14 million tons/year. According to MOL, the expansions were "enhancing the regional security of supply." In September 2025, MOL and the Adria pipeline operator Janaf conducted capacity tests at the section between the Sisak terminal and the Hungarian border, in an effort to reduce dependency on the Druzhba pipeline. According to Janaf, the second test established a safe operating rate of 2,100 m^{3}/h of oil, a third test however was only run at 1,650 m^{3}/h, with both companies giving different reason as to why the flow rate was lower than before. A pipeline linking MOLs Hungarian refinery in Százhalombatta and its Slovakian refinery in Bratislava was announced in January 2026.

As MOL aims to expand its petrochemical business, the company has earmarked EUR 1.2bn for investment in propylene-oxide based polyols, a high-value product applied in the automotive industry, packaging and furniture manufacturing. In 2018, it made a final investment decision on its Polyol Project, the biggest single investment of the company until 2021.

To expand their petrochemical portfolio, MOL has signed a partnership with German APK in 2018, supporting the completion of APK's plastic-recycling plant in Merseburg. As part of circular-economy and sustainability endeavors, the plant pilots a process dubbed "Newcycling", recovering high-quality materials from plastic waste.

For the natural gas division, the main focus is gas transmission via an extensive high pressure gas pipeline, which length exceeds 5,700 kilometres (3,500 mi). MOL was a member of the Nabucco pipeline project.

In the field of renewable energy MOL develops geothermal power production through the, CEGE Central European Geothermal Energy Production, a partnership with Australian-based Green Rock Energy Limited. The company supports the research of second generation biofuels at the University of Pannonia.

=== Retail Consumer Services ===
MOL gas station logo since 2012

In 2015, MOL launched the Fresh Corner brand, which is intended to compete with other gas station convenience stores, as well as small supermarkets. The brand first had stores only at gas stations but later expanded to standalone cafés and stores. By 2025 the brand had over 1,400 locations in ten countries.

As of 2018, MOL Group owns a network of nearly 2,000 service stations under six brands across ten countries in Central and Southern Europe.

In 2018, the company launched a car-sharing service in Budapest, MOL Limo.

=== Renewable and low carbon energy operations ===
In 2023, MOL acquired the Szarvas Biogas Plant from BayWa AG, which can produces 12.5 million cubic meters of biogas from 53,000 tonnes of agricultural waste as well as 40,000 tonnes of waste from meat production per year. In December 2024, MOL acquired Naperőmű Farm Kft., which was in development of a 66 MWp solar park at Ballószög in Hungary. At the time, MOL had six solar parks in Hungary with a combined capacity of 31.5 MW and a further 13.6 MW of solar capacity in Croatia. In June 2025, MOL began developing a project comprising a 37.4 MW solar farm and an energy storage facility with a capacity of 40 MWh at its Algyő site, which was opened in August 2026. In December 2025, MOL signed an agreement to acquire Polsolar Kft., which owned five solar parks near Mezőcsát with a combined capacity of 304 MW. In March 2026, MOL opened an energy storage facility with a capacity of 40 MWh at the Tiszaújváros site, where the company is also constructing a 48 MW solar farm.

=== Waste management operations ===
In June 2022, the Hungarian government announced that MOHU MOL Hulladékgazdálkodási Zrt., a subsidiary of MOL established for the tender, had been granted a 35-year waste management concession beginning in July 2023. As part of the concession, MOL announced it would invest more than $1.15 billion within the first ten years, including a waste-to-energy plant processing 100,000 tons of waste per year. In January 2024, MOHU introduced a deposit-refund system for single-use aluminum cans as well as plastic and glass bottles, which had a return rate of 88.8% in 2025.

In 2023, MOL and Lummus announced a partnership, which included a plastic waste recycling plant capable of processing 40,000 tonnes of plastic waste each year.

== Awards ==
At the 2016 Petroleum Economist Awards, MOL Group was named the Downstream Company of the Year and in 2018, it was awarded the Energy Company of the Year – Mid Cap prize.

== Controversies ==
=== Takeover attempt by OMV ===
In June 2007, Austrian energy company OMV made a bid to take over MOL, which was rejected by the Hungarian company. On 6 March 2008, the European Commission launched an investigation of OMV's bid. On 24 June 2008, OMV received a 'Statement of Objections' from the European Commission regarding the company's attempted takeover of MOL. In March 2009, OMV sold its 21% stake in MOL to Surgutneftegas. MOL called this move "unfriendly" and claimed OMV had acted as a front for Russian interests.

=== Surgutneftegas shares ===
Following the OMV's sale of its 21% stake of MOL to Surgutneftgas in 2009, MOL refused to register the Russian company as a shareholder with full rights, due to non-transparent ownership structure of Surgutneftegas. As a result, Surgutneftegas did not have its representatives in the board and the right to vote at general assemblies of shareholders. MOL defended its decision to block Surgut by arguing that the Russian company had not made its intentions towards the company clear. In May 2011, the Hungarian government bought the Russian Surgutneftegas's shares, thus the Hungarian state acquired 21.2% of the shares of MOL.

=== Legal dispute over INA ===
In 2011, Croatia started an investigation of ex-prime minister Ivo Sanader for allegedly accepting a €10 million bribe from MOL, in exchange for the Croatian Government approving the First Amendment to the Shareholders Agreement and thus MOL securing management rights, accusing also the company's chairman, Zsolt Hernádi. MOL repeatedly denied all the accusations. Soon after, the Hungarian prosecution launched investigation on suspicion of bribery and in 2012 dismissed allegations of criminal activity in this matter.

=== MOL received compensation after winning its legal dispute with Croatia ===
In the complex and lengthy disagreement involving MOL and INA, the International Centre for Settlement of Investment Disputes (ICSID) based in Washington ruled in favor of MOL. The dispute originated in 2013 when MOL initiated an arbitration case, alleging that Croatia had not fulfilled its contractual obligations. This marked the second time Croatia had found itself on the losing side of an arbitration case with MOL. The first instance was in 2014, with an award of €14.5 million granted by a Swiss court

With the ICSID ruling, MOL was practically declared the winner of the arbitration dispute against Croatia, and compensation in the amount of $250–300 million was given to MOL. This sum is far lower than MOL's initial claim of $1 billion. Additionally, the court dismissed Croatia's allegations of corruption against MOL, where the Hungarian company was accused of obtaining managerial control over INA through illicit means.

The ICSID decision highlighted Croatia's breach of contract, notably with regard to issues like gas trade regulation and natural gas pricing. This disregard for the law significantly harmed INA and, inadvertently, MOL. Further compensation was granted to MOL due to the compelled sale of stored natural gas by an INA subsidiary at lower prices.

Zdravko Maric, the Croatian Finance Minister, submitted his resignation after the ICSID's decision, claiming personal reasons. It remains unclear, though, exactly how his departure relates to the court's decision.

The ICSID decision is an important turning point in the prolonged legal fight between MOL and Croatia and a significant shift in their tumultuous history.

=== Croatia's request for review was denied by the Swiss court ===
In a related matter, opposition parties within the Croatian parliament were disappointment following the Swiss Federal Supreme Court's decision to reject Croatia's application for a review of the 2016 INA arbitration case. Ivo Sanader and Zsolt Tamas Hernádi were found guilty of bribery in a judgment that was upheld by the Croatian Supreme Court in February 2022, at the time when a request for a review was made.

Significant differences in the testimony of various people, most notably Robert Jezic, influenced the Swiss court's ruling. This outcome drew frustration among Croatian officials, with MP Dalija Oreskovic (Centre) asserting that the situation highlighted the nation's vulnerability and the potential inadequacy of its representation.

Some MPs contended that the Swiss Federal Supreme Court's verdict indicated concerns about the independence of Croatia's judiciary. Nikola Grmoja (Most party) suggested that the outcome of the INA case influenced the arbitration's result and the subsequent review request. He raised concerns about systemic flaws within Croatia's judicial system, casting doubt on the notion of an impartial judiciary.

=== Operations in Russia ===
According to a list maintained by the Yale School of Management, as of September 2025, the company suspended activities in Russia after the Russian invasion of Ukraine.

== See also ==
- List of oil exploration and production companies
- List of companies based in Budapest
