= Attila Szalay-Berzeviczy =

Hungarian economist

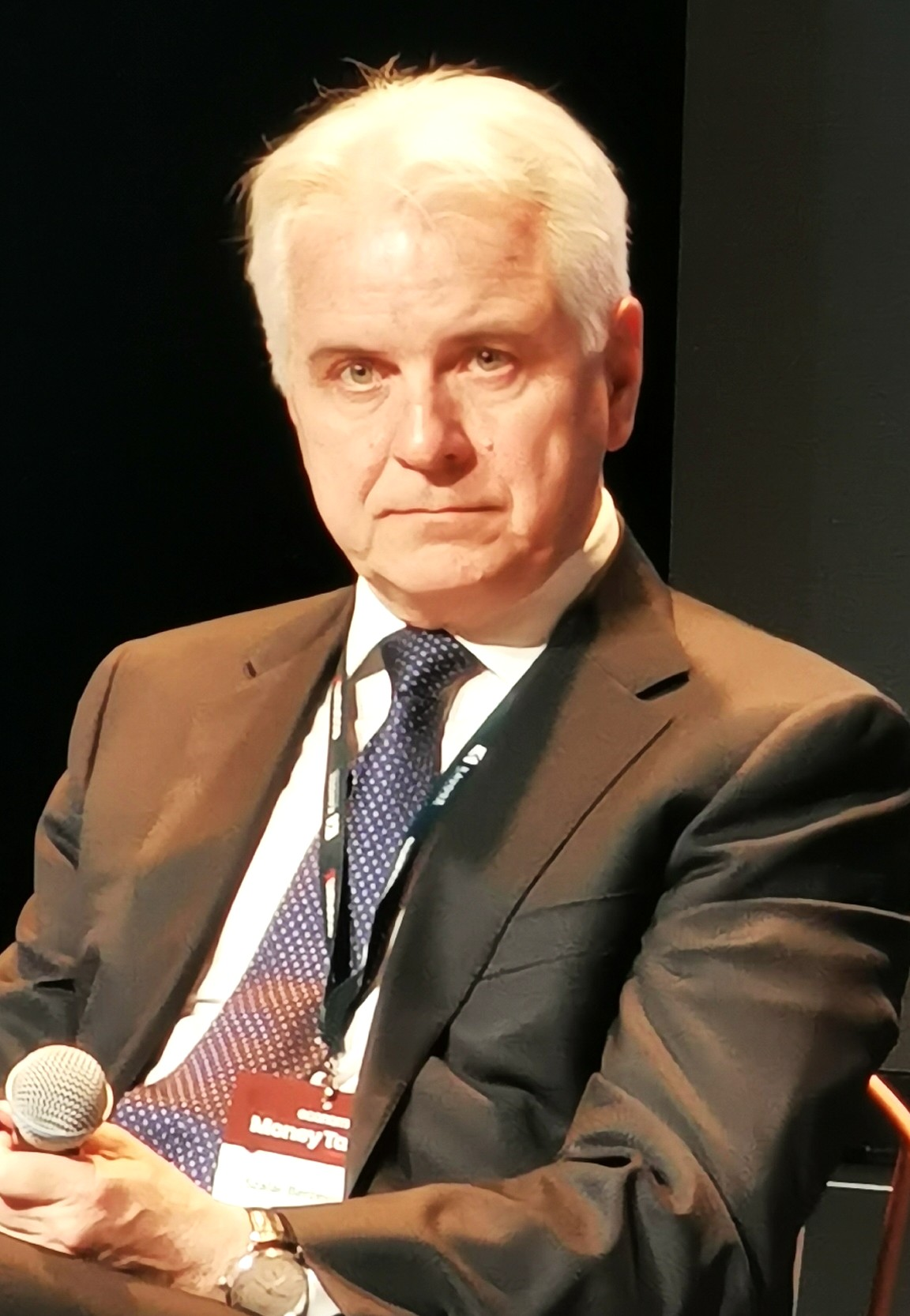
In 2025

Attila Szalay-Berzeviczy (born May 6, 1972) is a Hungarian economist and global head of Global Securities Services at UniCredit Group in Milan. He is the president of the Budapest Olympic Movement civil association and co-chairman of the Hungarian Fencing Federation.

== Studies and career ==
After graduating from the College of Modern Business Studies, he received an MSc in international business and economics at the University of Economic Sciences in Budapest. He spent one year in Istanbul with a scholarship of The Banks’ Association of Turkey. Szalay-Berzeviczy started his career at Budapest Bank's Foreign Operations Division in 1990 before joining Bank Austria Creditanstalt's International Markets Division. He was appointed managing director of UniCredit Hungary in 1999. Between 2004 and 2008, he was the chairman of the Budapest Stock Exchange and the Hungarian member of the board of the Federation of European Securities Exchanges.

In his tenure as the chairman of the Hungarian bourse, he played a role in the integration of the Budapest Commodity Exchange and the Budapest Stock Exchange, he developed and protected the Hungarian capital market as well as publicly promoted stock investments. He made efforts to establish the CEE union of national stock exchanges to serve as individual pillars with national exchanges. In June 2008, Szalay-Berzeviczy tendered his resignation after the Vienna Bourse announced it would purchase a 12.5pc stake in the Budapest Stock Exchange from UniCredit Bank Hungary to make it the stock exchange's biggest owner with a 37.7% stake.

The media projected Szalay-Berzeviczy became the front-runner candidate for the post of Minister of Economic Affairs in 2007; however he pulled out of the race, saying he would not take the job. In March 2009, his name was mentioned as a possible successor to the outgoing Prime Minister, Ferenc Gyurcsány.

== Budapest Olympics Movement ==
Since childhood, Szalay-Berzeviczy has been a keen sportsman and he is also engaged in sport matters. In 2005, with fifteen companies that play a decisive role in the Hungarian economy and a group of a hundred successful managing directors, media experts, well-known public figures and famous sportsmen, he founded the expressly non-political and non-profit civic organisation Budapest Olympics Movement (BOM).

Szalay-Berzeviczy's goal - whose great-grandfather was the founder and the first president of the Hungarian Olympic Committee between 1895 and 1904 - is to join respected forces who are convinced that the Summer Olympics and Paralympic Games being staged in Hungary would be extremely beneficial to the development and international respect of both the country and the capital, as well as to the lives of the people living there.

== Family ==
He was born into an old noble family, descended from the Ostffy branch from the age of the Árpád kings. A seven-generation family gave nine Members of Parliament and a minister to the country. Szalay-Berzeviczy's ancestors include Pál Szinyei Merse, Ágoston Trefort and László Szalay. His great-grandfather was Albert Berzeviczy, who was Speaker of the House of Representatives and Minister of Religion and Education in the first István Tisza cabinet, President of the Hungarian Academy of Sciences and of the Hungarian Olympic Committee. Szalay-Berzeviczy is a son of Gábor Szalay-Berzeviczy, a former Hungarian MP and SZDSZ member.
