= Zavarovalnica Triglav =

Slovenian multinational insurance company

Zavarovalnica Triglav d.d.
- Type: Listed
- Traded as: LJSE: ZVTG; SBI TOP Component
- Industry: Insurance
- Founded: 5 July 1900; 126 years ago
- Headquarters: Ljubljana, Slovenia
- Area served: Central and Southeastern Europe
- Key people: Andrej Slapar (CEO); Igor Stebernak (chairman of the supervisory board)
- Products: Insurance, asset management
- Revenue: ▲€1,184.2 million (2019)
- Net income: ▲€100.9 million (2019)
- Total assets: ▲€3,937 million (2019)
- Total equity: ▲€791.9 million (2019)
- Number of employees: 5,281 (2019)
- Subsidiaries: Triglav, zdravstvena zavarovalnica d.d. Skupna pokojninska družba, d.d. Pozavarovalnica Triglav Re d.d. Triglav Skladi, družba za upravljanje, d.o.o. Triglav INT, holdinška družba d.d. Triglav, Upravljanje nepremičnin d.d. Triglav Svetovanje, zavarovalno zastopanje, d.o.o. Triglav Avtoservis, d.o.o. Triglav osiguranje d.d. Triglav osiguranje a.d. Triglav osiguranje d.d. Triglav Osiguranje a.d.o. Lovćen Osiguranje a.d. Triglav Osiguruvanje AD Triglav Osiguruvanje Život AD
- Website: www.triglav.eu/en

Zavarovalnica Triglav d.d. (English: Triglav Insurance Company PLC) is a Slovenian multinational insurance company headquartered in Ljubljana, Slovenia. Its core businesses are insurance, reinsurance and asset management. In year 2019 it generated a net income of €100.9 million. It is the largest insurance company in Slovenia with a market share of 36%, and has subsidiaries in Croatia, Bosnia and Herzegovina, Serbia, Montenegro and North Macedonia.

Zavarovalnica Triglav is publicly traded on Ljubljana Stock Exchange, and it is a component of SBI TOP index which is a main share index of companies listed on Ljubljana Stock Exchange.

== History ==
=== Foundation ===
Zavarovalnica Triglav was founded in Ljubljana on 5 July 1900 with initial capital of 100,000 Austrian krone. Its first president and one of its founders was Ivan Vencajz, member of Austrian empire council, lawyer and judge. The company commenced operations on 1 August 1900. At the beginning, it provided mostly fire and church bell insurance.

During the first few years, Triglav encountered multiple difficulties due to the negative reaction of rival insurance companies to its foundation. In an attempt to prevent it from growing further, they decreased their premiums and urged reinsurance firms against providing reinsurance to Triglav. Eventually, Triglav had to find reinsurance in Czech Republic.

=== 20th-century developments ===
After the end of World War I, Triglav faced high inflation and loss of portfolio. In order to survive inflationary times, they had to offer new products to their clients. In year 1919, it began providing life insurance and twelve years later, in 1931, they commenced with non-life insurance business as well. It was then, when they expanded their operations outside of Slovenia, to the countries that were then a part of Kingdom SHS. After the start of World War II and subsequent occupation of Slovenia, the vast majority of Slovenian insurance businesses were forced to transfer their clients to their Austrian, Italian and German counterparts.

In 1945, the majority of insurance companies were nationalised, but Triglav avoided this wave of nationalisation. Instead, it transformed into the Slovenian insurance institute with headquarters in Belgrade and was a primary provider of insurance for all of the state's wealth. They were operating in this way until 1961.

Many small insurers realised that more effective risk management could only be achieved with a formation of a bigger insurance company. This has led them to merge into two big insurance firms: Zavarovalnica Sava with its headquarters in Ljubljana and Zavarovalnica Maribor based in Maribor. In 1976, both firms have merged into Triglav insurance group headquartered in Ljubljana. Sava reinsurance firm, the first reinsurance company in Slovenia was also created in that time. By 1990, Triglav had 95% market share in Slovenia and was a third biggest insurance firm in Yugoslavia.

In 1990, Zavarovalnica Triglav transformed into public limited company under the name Zavarovalnica Triglav, d.d., which commenced operations on 1 January 1991. Triglav asset management was founded in 1994, and Triglav Reinsurance company was formed in 1998.

=== 21st-century developments ===
In early 2000s, Triglav began intensive business expansion by entering the banking sector through acquisition of Abanka d.d. and started to broaden its operations into foreign markets.

In 2000, the subsidiary was established in Brno, the Czech Republic, and in 2001 it expanded its operations into Bosnia and Herzegovina. In November 2002, Triglav Health Insurance was founded through the reorganisation of the Concordia life insurance company. In the following years, numerous insurance businesses all over the Southeastern Europe joined Triglav Group either through acquisitions or mergers.

In 2008, the shares of Triglav Group were first quoted on the Ljubljana Stock Exchange. The same year, the company was awarded an “A” rating by the Standard & Poor's Rating Services. Since 2009, Triglav has been focused on the profitability of its core business, careful monitoring of underwriting risk, consolidation of business functions and transfer of knowledge. All along, this has been underpinned by a continued development of the effective risk management system.

By signing the agreement to acquire the Croatian pension insurer Raiffeisen Mirovinsko Insurance Club in 2018, the Triglav Group entered the Croatian pension insurance market. In March 2019, the Group also entered North Macedonia's pension insurance market. In April 2019, Triglav Skladi became the owner of ALTA Skladi investment firm. As a result, the Triglav Group has emerged as the leading provider of mutual funds in the Slovene market, and that has further strengthened its assets management activity, which is its second strategic business pillar in addition to insurance.

== Company ==
=== Operations ===
The Triglav Group consists of 28 different companies that operate in six countries in Central and Southeastern Europe. Insurance is the primary business of twelve of those companies, four of them are asset management firms and eleven conduct other operations, ranging from advising to car maintenance. The Group also has a reinsurance company, which primary business is reinsurance. Currently, the company is present in Slovenia, Croatia, Serbia, Montenegro, Bosnia and Herzegovina and North Macedonia. As of 2019, the Group has 5,281 employees.

=== Finances ===
As of 2019, the Triglav Group is the largest insurance company in Slovenia with market share of 35.5%, Montenegro with market share of 38.7% and North Macedonia with 13.8%. Its 2019 revenue was €1,184.2 million and its net income was €100.9 million. Both figures increased from the previous year. As of August 30, 2019 its market capitalisation stood at €716.16 million.

Year	Revenue in millions €	Net income in millions €	Total Assets in millions €	Employees
2010	1,013.6	43.3	3,024.4	5,247
2011	989.4	57.9	2,962	5,064
2012	936.3	89.7	3,123.8	5,379
2013	900.9	83.6	3,077.1	5,351
2014	888.2	100.4	3,275.4	5,406
2015	919.1	102.5	3,493.4	5,379
2016	936	95.1	3,574.8	5,046
2017	999.9	84.4	3,674.6	5,151
2018	1,068.4	97.5	3,645	5,166
2019	1,184.2	100.9	3,937	5,281

== Management ==
The current CEO of the company is Andrej Slapar. In the management board, there are also Barbara Smolnikar, Tadej Čoroli, Uroš Ivanc and Marica Makoter, who is also the employee representative. Igor Stebernak serves as the chairman of the supervisory board.
