= Manfred Gotta =

German entrepreneur (born 1947)

- Born: 24 August 1947 (age 79); Nieder-Roden, Hesse
- Education: Goethe University Frankfurt
- Occupation: Businessman

Manfred Gotta is a German businessman who coined automobile brand names Mégane, Twingo, Smart, Cayenne and Vectra. He also coined the names of Xetra, Congstar and Megaperls.

== Early life ==
Gotta was born on 24 August 1947 in Nieder-Roden, Hesse. He began studying business administration at the Goethe University Frankfurt but did not complete his degree, working for a period as a gas station attendant and a postal worker before joining a Frankfurt advertising agency in his late thirties.

== Career ==
Gotta founded his own naming agency in Frankfurt on 1 April 1986, initially as the Institut für Markennamenentwicklung. The company, now known as GOTTA Brands, later relocated to Forbach-Hundsbach in the Black Forest, near Baden-Baden. In addition to the automobile names he is best known for, Gotta has also coined names for products and companies including Panamera, the *Porsche Panamera*, and the corporate name Evonik Industries, created for the former RAG mining group.

Gotta has been referred to in German media as the "king of names" ("König der Namen") for his prominence in the branding industry
