= Nicola Tricarico =

Italian opera singer

Nicolò Tricarico (Venice, fl. 1690s) was an early Italian contralto opera singer, well known as a singer of comic parts. A possible relationship to the composer Giuseppe Tricarico and his brother the musician Antonio Tricarico has been proposed in some studies, but without firm evidence.
