= Budapest Stock Exchange =

Stock exchange in Budapest, Hungary

Coordinates: 47°29′51″N 19°01′44″E

- Budapesti Értéktőzsde
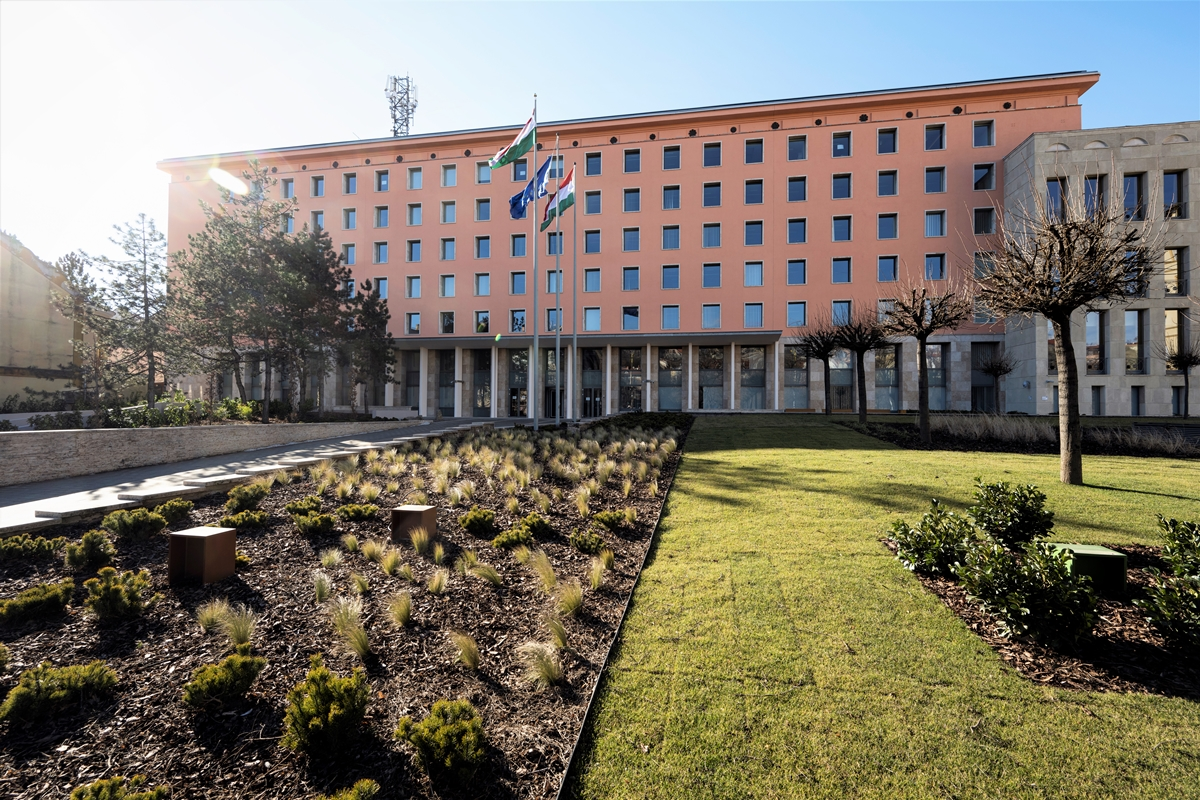
- Type: Stock exchange
- Location: 55 Krisztina boulevard, Budapest, Hungary
- Founded: January 18, 1864; 161 years ago (original incarnation); June 21, 1990; 35 years ago (reinstated)
- Owner: Hungarian private investors and the central bank
- Key people: Tibor Tóth (CEO)
- Currency: Hungarian forint
- No. of listings: 156 (November 2025)
- Market cap: US$ 66 billion equities (November 2025)
- Volume: US$ 47,1 million daily (October 2025)
- Indices: BUX; BUMIX; CETOP; XTEND
- Website: bse.hu

Budapest Stock Exchange (BSE) (Hungarian: Budapesti Értéktőzsde, pronounced [ˈbudɒpɛʃti ˈeːrteːktøːʒdɛ] (BÉT)) is the third largest stock exchange in Central and Eastern Europe by market capitalization and liquidity. It is located at 55 Krisztina Boulevard, Budapest, Hungary, in the Buda Centre of the Hungarian National Bank Previously, from 1864, during the Austro-Hungarian Empire it was located in the Budapest Stock Exchange Palace building, until a large trading floor was necessary.

The Hungarian National Bank holds an equity stake of 81.35 percent in the Budapest Stock Exchange, following a takeover transaction in 2015. The BSE is member of the World Federation of Exchanges and the Federation of European Securities Exchanges.

Since its reinstatement in 1990, the Budapest Stock Exchange accounts for all the turnover in the Hungarian market and a large share of the Central and Eastern European market. In 2007, BSE agreed to move to abolish floor trading, the trading today takes place via the Xetra system, with redundant floor brokers taking on the role of market-makers. Xetra is the reference market for all exchange trading in Hungarian equities and exchange traded funds. The prices on Xetra serve as the basis for calculating the BUX, the best-known Hungarian share index. Xetra has 60 per cent market share throughout Europe with over 230 trading participants from 18 European countries, plus Hong Kong and the United Arab Emirates are connected via Xetra. Xetra trading at Budapest runs from 09:00 to 17:00 with closing auction from 17:00-17:05, and post-trading trading times until 17:20. BSE was introduced a pre market trading from 08:15 to 08:30 and an opening auction call from 08:30 to 09:00.

== History ==
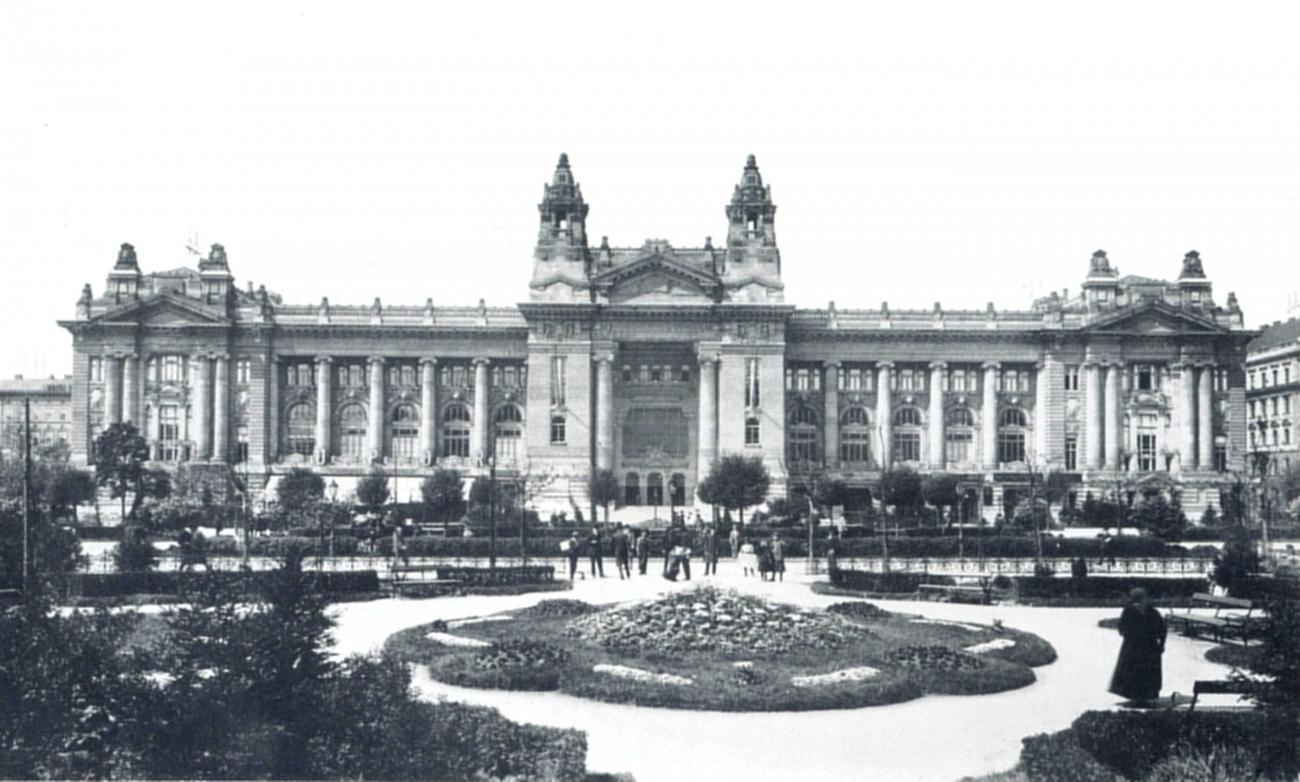
Budapest Stock Exchange's Liberty Square building in 1905

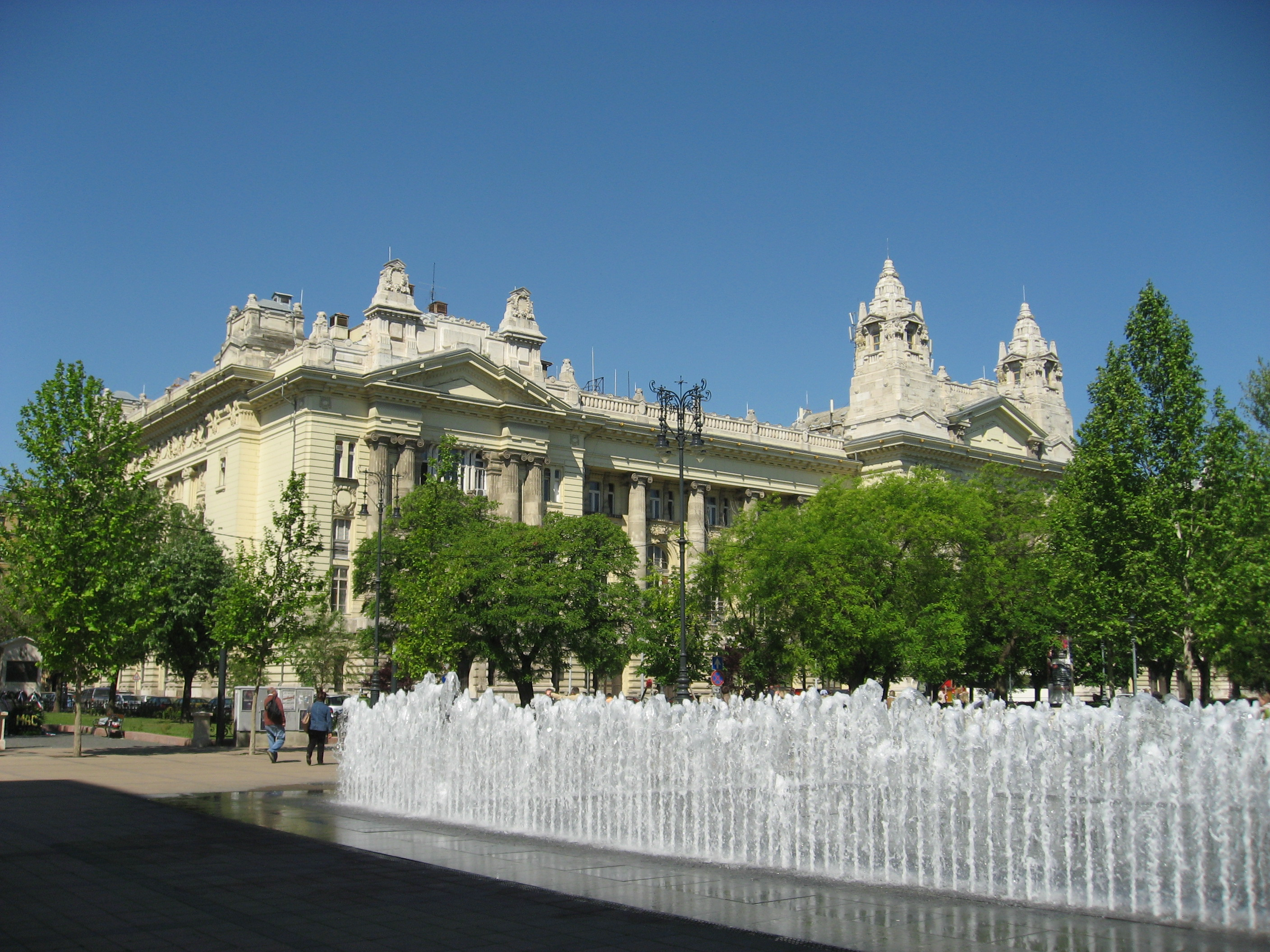
Budapest Stock Exchange's ex Liberty Square building in 2017

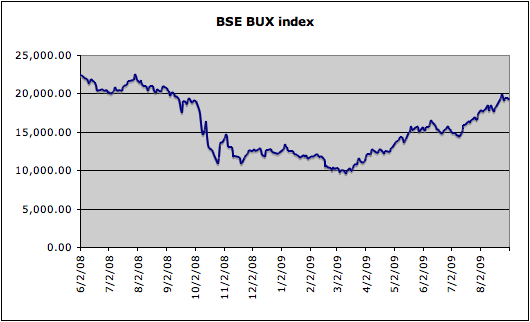
The performance of the BUX index during the 2008 crisis

The Hungarian Stock Exchange, the ancestor of today's Budapest Stock Exchange (BSE) started its operation on 18 January 1864 in Pest on the banks of the Danube, in a building of the Lloyd Insurance Company. The committee in charge of setting up the exchange was led by Frigyes Kochmeister, who was also elected as the first chairman of the exchange (1864–1900). When the exchange was launched in 1864, there were 17 equities, one debenture, 11 foreign currencies and 9 bills of exchange listed. After a few years of slow growth, 1872 saw the first significant market boom, when the Minister of Trade approved the articles of incorporation of 15 industrial and 550 financial companies whose shares were then listed on the exchange. The BSCE moved into a new building in 1873 and until 1905 continued its operations in a building on the corner of Wurm Street (now Szende Pál Street). In 1905 it relocated to the Exchange Palace on Liberty Square.

The first real market crash of the exchange occurred in May 1873. The early 1890s marked another period of spectacular market boom in the exchange's history, partially fuelled by a general investment optimism that was characteristic of the Millennium years, and by recent trends in the international stock markets. Following 1889 the stock prices of companies listed on the Budapest Stock Exchange were also published in Vienna, Frankfurt, London and Paris. From the 1890s Hungarian government bonds were regularly traded on the stock exchanges of London, Paris, Amsterdam and Berlin.

By the turn of the century, there were already 310 securities traded on the exchange; by the beginning of World War I, this increased to almost 500. The annual turnover in 1913 reached one million shares and the turnover of the Budapest Giro and Mutual Society amounted to 2.7 billion Crowns (the ancestor of the Forint). At the same time there was also a dynamic expansion in grain trading with almost 400,000 tons in 1875, growing to one million tons by the turn of the century and close to one and a half million tons by WWI. As a result of this expansion the BSCE was propelled to become the leading grain exchange in Europe.

As in most European countries, the outbreak of World War I brought about the exchange's closure on 27 July 1914, although trading did not cease. Brokers continued trading during the war and equity prices showed a massive increase starting in 1914. By 1918 over 7.2 million securities had been traded in a year. The exchange reopened after the war were, the post-war inflationary environment pushed exchange turnover to exceptional highs, tempered only by the introduction in 1925 of the country's new currency, the pengő. The following four years leading to the market crash of the New York Stock Exchange in October 1929 saw the downturn of the BSCE. On 14 July 1931, the BSCE was closed down again as a result of a German banking moratorium and a series of financial collapses of the continent's major banks. Bond trading officially resumed only in 1932, followed by trading in the 18 most traded equities. Following a short period of recovery, the market entered an expansionary phase in 1934, reaching its peak in 1936. Gustav Szabo became the youngest person ever to have a seat on Budapest Stock exchange at 18 years old when his father died in 1939.

When Hungary entered World War II, the exchange saw a period of unprecedented boom, and equity prices in the heavy and military industries increased manifold. In 1942 the government applied stricter measures for the BSCE articles of incorporation and set maximum values on daily price changes. Despite these restrictions the exchange was able to continue its operations until the start of the city's siege in mid-December 1944. World War II was followed by a period of hyperinflation, characterized by a lively private stock and real exchange trading in currencies and precious metals, conducted partially in the damaged building of the exchange. The exchange officially re-opened in August 1946, following the launch of the forint on August 1. As companies defaulted on their payments of bonds issued previously in the crown and pengő currencies, and since limited companies failed to pay dividends on their stocks due to the war damages they suffered, prices kept falling. Two months after the 1948 nationalisation of the majority of private Hungarian firms, the government officially dissolved the Budapest Stock and Commodity Exchange, and the exchange's assets became state property.

The first milestone in the re-open of Budapest Stock Exchange was the Government of Hungary's decision to give green light for the preparation of the Securities Act of 1989. The draft bill was submitted to Parliament in January 1990 and came into force on 1 March. At the same time that the bill came into force on 21 June 1990, the BSE held its statutory general meeting and the Exchange re-opened its doors. With 41 founding members and one single equity, IBUSZ, the Budapest Stock Exchange was set up as a sui generis organisation, an independent legal entity. The re-establishment of the market economy during the same time and the privatisation of businesses played a decisive role in the exchange's operations. Even though the sale of the larger state-owned businesses often involved the assistance of strategic investors, the BSE played a significant role in the privatisation of many leading Hungarian companies including Rába, MOL Group, OTP Bank, Magyar Telekom, Danubius Hotels Group, Richter Gedeon Co., IBUSZ, Skála-Coop, Globus and more.

The first trading floor was in the Trade Center on Váci Street, followed by its move in 1992 to the atmospheric old building at Deák Ferenc Street in Belváros-Lipótváros, where it continued its operations for 15 years. In March, 2007 the BSE moved to the former Herczog Palace at 93 Andrássy Avenue. The Open outcry system of the physical trading floor that characterized the spot market functioned with partial electronic support until 1995. From 1995 until November, 1998 securities trading took place concurrently on the trading floor and in a remote trading system, when the new MultiMarket Trading System (MMTS), based entirely on remote trading was launched. The traditional “battlefield rumble” of the physical trading floor ceased within a year by September 1999, at which time physical trading was entirely replaced by the electronic remote trading platform of the derivatives market. Derivatives market of the BSE in futures and options contracts has been available to investors since 1995. BUX contracts have been available for trading since the start of the futures market on 31 March 1995. In July, 1998 the BSE was among the first exchanges in the world to introduce contracts based on individual equities. Another series of standardised derivatives in the options market appeared in February, 2000 and on 6 September 2004 trading commenced in the exchange's second index, the BUMIX. In January, 2010, BSE became a member of the CEE Stock Exchange Group.

On 6 December 2013, on the occasion of the exchange's new trading platform launch the stock exchange trading was ceremonially opened by Mihály Varga, Minister of National Economy. That day the new Xetra trading system replaced the system that has been in use for 15 years. In February 2015 the BSE moved to new premises in Liberty Square. On 20 November 2015 the Hungarian National Bank concluded a sales contract with the Austrian CEESEG AG and Österreichische Kontrollbank AG, the entities that to date held a 68.8 per cent ownership in BSE. The BSE currently operates in the Buda Centre of the Hungarian National Bank on Krisztina Boulevard.

In its strategy for the period 2021–2025, the Budapest Stock Exchange outlined its earlier efforts to develop the domestic capital markets. According to this, the BSE's goal remains to increase the role of capital markets in Hungary and to support the growth and competitiveness of companies, taking into account sustainability aspects, thus ensuring the prosperity of Hungarian households.

On 21 June 2023, the 33rd anniversary of its re-establishment, the Budapest Stock Exchange went public. The purpose of the listing is to promote the benefits of public operation among domestic medium-sized companies, while supporting the objectives of ownership and the international ambitions of the Exchange. The Hungarian National Bank, however, maintained its dominant equity stake at 81.35 percent, unchanged from its level before listing.

On 23 August 2023, the company formed EuroCTP as a joint venture with 13 other bourses, in an effort to provide a consolidated tape for the European Union, as part of the Capital Markets Union proposed by the European Commission.

== Organisation ==
The Exchange's organisation, internal trading supervision, implementation of the Board's decisions, publication of information on the exchange and the Exchange's overall business administration are duties of the chief executive officer. The Exchange shall comply with the principles established by the Capital Market Act and shall ensure that investment service providers trading on the Exchange, issuers and investors should have the power to issue their opinion while equally participating in the decision-making process affecting the Exchange. In order to ensure this, the Exchange operates committees for the representation of interests. Committee members are elected by traders and issuers, and their mandates expire at the same time as the mandates of the Board of the Exchange.

The Trading Committee formulates the professional view of the vendors, represents vendors' interests in professional issues and ensures the institutional possibility of professional control of decisions. The Committee of Issuers formulates the professional view of the issuers, represents issuers' interests in professional issues and ensures the institutional possibility of professional control of decisions. The representative promoting investors' interests is authorized to issue an opinion on all proposals concerning the interests of investors. The representative is elected by the organisations and associations representing investors' interests. The Settlement Committee participates in the preparation of decisions regarding the Exchange's settlement system and ensures effective professional oversight. Its members and chairman are elected by the BSE Board based on vendor recommendations. The Index Committee was set up to oversee the expansion and ongoing maintenance of the BSE's main indexes. In addition, it is charged with developing and publishing the Exchange's other indicators. The members of the committee are independent market experts appointed by the board of directors.

=== Listing ===
Listing of equity series takes place on Prime or Standard Markets. In September 2017, BSE also launched a market tailored to medium-sized companies called Xtend. On the Standard Market, in addition to the basic requirements of the law, BSE prescribes a public transaction to be carried out, with regard to the equity series to be listed. In case admission is sought to the Prime Market, the company and the series of securities to be listed shall comply with certain further requirements (size of the series, free float, completed business years, etc.). A public transaction, involving the securities series to be listed is mandatory on the Prime Market as well, however, in this category, issuers may request a one-year postponement to fulfill this obligation.

In July 2019 the Budapest Stock Exchange launched BÉT Xbond, which is closely related to the Bond Funding for Growth Scheme (BGS) of the Hungarian National Bank and offers an alternative trading venue for companies planning to issue bonds.

=== Trading ===
On the Exchange, the right to trade is ensured exclusively for persons to whom the Exchange has given the respective licence, the so-called trading licence. Investors can realize their deals on the exchange through these exchange-trading companies. Exchange trading takes place in sections, at present there are four such sections: equities section, debt securities section, derivatives section, commodity section.

Current exchange trading members are provided here: List of Exchange Members

=== Market surveillance and protective mechanisms ===
Trading at the Budapest Stock Exchange is governed by clear rules, which apply equally for all trading participants. Independent market surveillance is made by Hungarian National Bank's Market Supervision Board. It holds primary responsibility for enforcing the securities laws, proposing securities rules, and regulating the securities industry, the country's stock and options exchanges, and other activities and organizations, including the electronic securities markets in Hungary.

With a view to improving the continuity of prices and to avoid mistrades, several protective mechanisms are in place for the trading venues Xetra and Budapest Stock Exchange. These include volatility interruption, market order interruption, and liquidity interruption measures.

== Leadership ==
=== Chairmen ===
| Name | Period |
|---|---|
| Lajos Bokros | 1990–1995 |
| Sándor Czirják | 1995–1995 |
| János Száz | 1995–1996 |
| Zsigmond Járai | 1996–1998 |
| Lotfi Farbod | 1998–1998 |
| András Simor | 1998–2002 |
| György Jaksity | 2002–2004 |
| Attila Szalay-Berzeviczy | 2004–2008 |
| Mihály Patai | 2008–2011 |
| Michael Buhl | 2011–2015 |
| Márton Nagy | 2015–2017 |
| Richárd Végh | 2017–2019 |
| Mihály Patai | 2019–2023 |
| Barnabás Virág | 2023- |

=== Board of directors ===
| Barnabás Virág | Chairman |
| Tibor Tóth | Member |
| György Bacsa | Member |
| Attila Bánfi | Member |
| Zoltán Kurali | Member |
| Zsolt Kuti | Member |
| Attila Simon Tóth | Member |

=== Stock Exchange Advisory Body ===
The Stock Exchange Advisory Board was founded in 2016. With 12 members, the body is responsible for preparing, establishing and commenting on BSE's strategic and business decisions.

| Ilona Hardy, President | Aranykor Önkéntes Nyugdíjpénztár |
| Tamás Bánfi | Corvinus University of Budapest |
| Róbert Cselovszki | Erste Befektetési Zrt. |
| Ádám Hegyi | K&H Bank Ltd. |
| György Jaksity | Concorde Securities Ltd. |
| Zsigmond Járai | MOL Plc. |
| Kálmán Nagy | Concorde MB Partners |
| András Nemescsói | DLA Piper Hungary |
| Gábor Orbán | Gedeon Richter Plc. |
| Bálint Szécsényi | Equilor Befektetési Zrt. |
| Sándor Vízkeleti | Association of Hungarian Investment Fund and Asset Management Companies |
| Levente Zsembery | Lamassu Capital |

== Index Tracking and International Connectivity ==
Passive exposure for international investors to the main equity index BUX is possible through an exchange-traded fund - Expat Hungary BUX UCITS ETF - listed in Frankfurt on Xetra and traded in euro (ticker: HUBE, ISIN: BGHUBUX01189). The fund acts as a conduit for capital flows between the international financial markets and the Hungarian capital market.

== See also ==
- BUX
- Economy of Hungary
- Economy of Budapest
- List of companies of Hungary
- List of European stock exchanges
- List of stock exchange opening times
- Hungarian National Bank (Securities and exchange surveillance)
- New York Stock Exchange
