= Ljubljana Stock Exchange =

Stock exchange located in Ljubljana, Slovenia

- Ljubljanska borza
- Type: Stock Exchange
- Location: Ljubljana, Slovenia
- Founded: 1989
- Owner: Zagreb Stock Exchange
- Key people: Aleš Ipavec (President of the Management Board); Nina Vičar (Member of the Management Board)
- Currency: EUR (€)
- No. of listings: 58 (Dec 2025)
- Market cap: €56.0 billion (31 Dec 2025)
- Volume: €834.63 million (2025)
- Website: ljse.si/en

Ljubljana Stock Exchange or LJSE (Slovene: Ljubljanska borza, pronounced [ljubljanska boɾza]) is a stock exchange located in Ljubljana, Slovenia. It is Slovenia's only stock exchange and a wholly-owned subsidiary of Zagreb Stock Exchange. The exchange trades shares of Slovenian companies, as well as bonds and commercial papers.

The core business of the Ljubljana stock exchange is to ensure a secure, efficient and successful operation of the regulated segment of the Slovene capital market, in accordance with the law and other regulations.

LJSE performs the following business activities:

- operates the stock exchange market in financial instruments, for which it had obtained authorization from the Agency,
- provides the prices of financial instruments,
- provides information on supply and demand, market values and other data on financial instruments,
- provides technical services to support trading,
- operates a CSI.

Additional activities include the services for trading members and listed companies.

On 23 August 2023, the company formed EuroCTP as a joint venture with 13 other bourses, in an effort to provide a consolidated tape for the European Union, as part of the Capital Markets Union proposed by the European Commission.

== History ==
The existing Ljubljana Stock Exchange was established in 1989. However, brokerage in Slovenia has a much longer tradition: the first stock exchange in Ljubljana existed as early as in the period between 1924 and 1942. Unfortunately, during the Second World War the trading on the old exchange was suspended, and after the war also officially banned by a decree by the new communist regime which replaced monarchy in Yugoslavia. Slovenians were thus left without a stock exchange for almost half a century. Then in 1989, the Ljubljana Stock Exchange was officially established. In 1993, LJSE introduced electronic trading on BTS - on complex Stock Exchange Information System three times a week, floor trading still remained on Tuesdays and Thursdays. The new system of electronic information dissemination - SEOnet was launched in 2002. Three years later LJSE introduced the elite segment of the official market, listing Slovenia's prime companies, and named it Prime Market.

In the middle of 2008, the first regional road-show of SE Europe, organized by all 8 exchanges from the region, was held in Zagreb.

In 2008, the Wiener Börse (Vienna Stock Exchange) bought an 81% stake in the exchange. In 2010, ATVP, the Slovene market regulator, restricted the Wiener Börse's voting rights. The rights would be restored only by either purchasing full ownership or no more than 25% stake. The case was taken to the Slovene Supreme Court, which upheld the ATVP ruling. The Wiener Börse bought the remaining shares.

In 2009, the CEE Stock Exchange Group (CEESEG) was established, including the Wiener Börse and the stock exchanges of Budapest, Ljubljana and Prague.

In 2010, there were three major events. The SBITOP Index as the first genuine LJSE blue-chip index became a benchmark index. The exchange launched INFO HRAMBA - the new information system for the central storage of regulated information of all issuers on the LJSE. The exchange published the Slovene Capital Market Development Strategy. This document prepared in cooperation with the capital market participants addressed changing economic and financial circumstances. This strategy proposed the introduction of 'P accounts' in the third pension pillar. The exchange started trading on the international trading system Xetra allowing it to be integrated into an international capital market.

In July 2015, the Wiener Börse sold the Ljubljana Stock Exchange to the Zagreb Stock Exchange (Zagrebačka burza).

On 22 February 2016, the Ljubljana Stock Exchange, along with the Belgrade Stock Exchange, decided to join SEE Link, and an EBRD-sponsored regional network for trading securities.

== Trading ==
Trading on the Ljubljana Stock Exchange operates through an electronic order book in the Xetra trading system. Xetra trading system was implemented at the Ljubljana Stock Exchange on December 6, 2010. The Slovene capital market is now more easily accessible, internationally comparable and competitive market. The exchange has pre-market sessions from 08:00am to 09:30am and normal trading sessions from 09:30am to 01:00pm on all days of the week except Saturdays, Sundays and holidays declared by the Exchange in advance.

On the basis of meeting the LJSE liquidity criteria, securities are traded in the continuous or auction trading methods.

The two trading methods ensure greater market integrity, improve best-price-forming mechanisms, and enable the Exchange and its members to set up internal controls and thus help identify potential cases of market manipulation.

=== Stock indices ===
SBI TOP is the first genuine LJSE blue-chip index and serves as the Slovene capital market benchmark index. It measures the performance of the most liquid and highly capitalized stocks on the LJSE Market. It is designed as a tradable index. Due to the liquidity of the constituents, it is intended to serve as underlying for index-linked financial instruments.

== Index Trackers and International Connectivity ==
Passive exposure to the SBI TOP index for international investors is possible through an exchange-traded fund - Expat Slovenia SBI TOP UCITS ETF - listed in Frankfurt on Xetra (ticker SLQX, ISIN: BGSLOBI02187) and traded in euro. The fund acts as a conduit for capital flows between the international financial markets and the Slovenian capital market.

== See also ==
- List of stock exchanges
- List of European stock exchanges
