= Troglav =

Troglav may refer to:

- Troglav (mythology), deity in Slavic mythology whose three heads were believed to represent sky, earth and the underworld
- Troglav (Bosnia and Herzegovina), a mountain massif and peak in western Bosnia and Herzegovina on the border with Croatia
  - NK Troglav Livno, a football club named after the aforementioned peak
- Troglav (Serbia), a mountain in central Serbia
