= Central European Blue Chip Index =

Central European stock market index

CETOP
- Foundation: January 1, 2001
- Operator: Budapest Stock Exchange
- Exchanges: Central Europe
- Constituents: 25
- Type: Large-cap
- Weighting method: Free-float capitalization-weighted
- Website: CETOP

The Central European Blue Chip Index (CETOP) is a stock market index which reflects the performance of the companies with the biggest market value and turnover in the Central European region.

The aim of the CETOP index is to serve as a benchmark for the portfolio managers who invest in the region. Blue chip equities of the Central European region are included in the index basket selected on the basis of global ranking, taking into account that a maximum of 7 securities from one stock exchange may be simultaneously included in the index. The index is reviewed twice a year, in March and September.

The eligible securities are those shares that are listed on at least one of the following Exchanges:

- Budapest Stock Exchange
- Warsaw Stock Exchange
- Prague Stock Exchange
- Bratislava Stock Exchange
- Ljubljana Stock Exchange
- Zagreb Stock Exchange
- Bucharest Stock Exchange

== Components ==
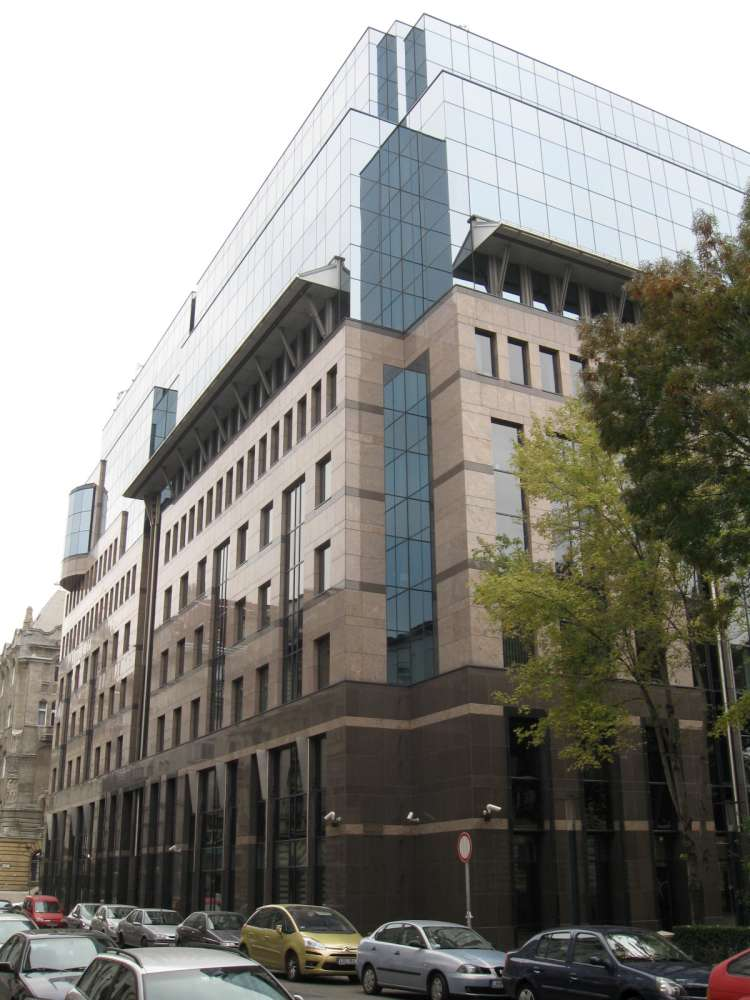
The Budapest Stock Exchange

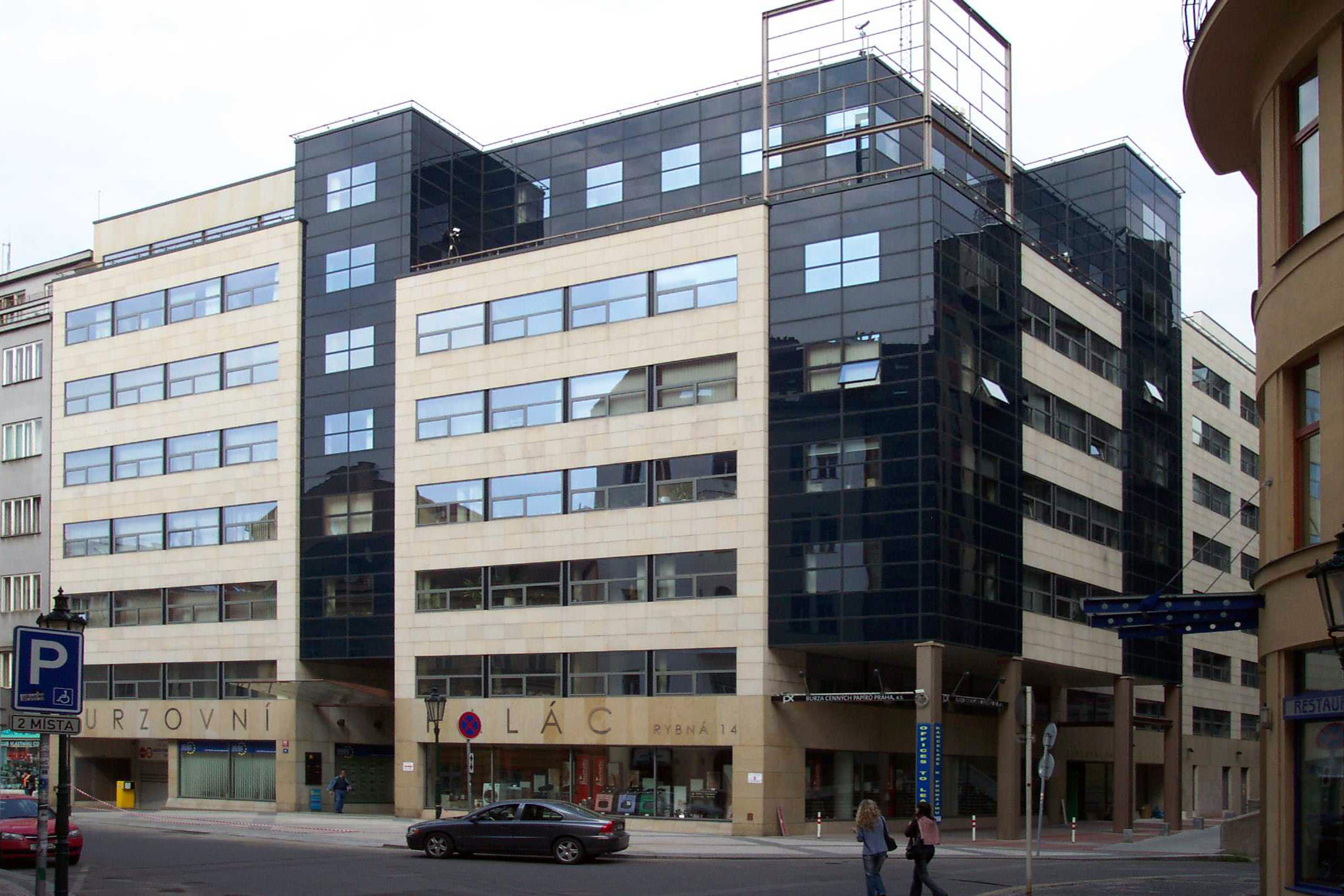
The Prague Stock Exchange

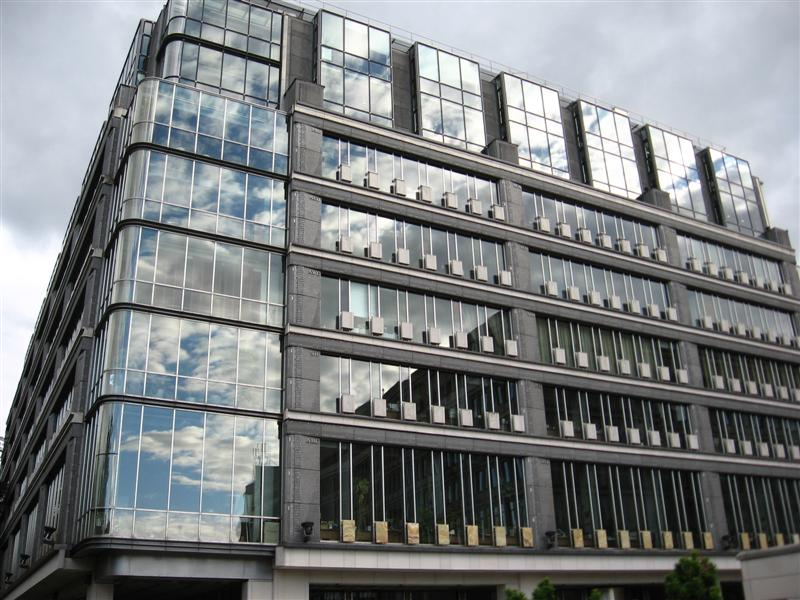
The Warsaw Stock Exchange

Index composition of CETOP as of October 2025
Country	Company	Index weighting (%)
(Poland)	PKN Orlen	7.17
(Poland)	PKO BP	8.06
(Poland)	Dino Polska	4.47
(Poland)	Bank Pekao	5.41
(Poland)	PZU	6.54
(Hungary)	OTP Bank	9.98
(Poland)	Allegro	5.47
(Poland)	KGHM	3.03
(Czech Republic)	CEZ	7.18
(Austria)	Erste Group	10.81
(Romania)	Hidroelectrica	1.97
(Czech Republic)	Komerční banka	2.90
(Hungary)	MOL	3.43
(Hungary)	Richter Gedeon	3.15
(Hungary)	Magyar Telekom	1.20
(Romania)	OMV Petrom	2.63
(Romania)	Banca Transilvania	4.06
(Romania)	Romgaz	1.33
(Slovenia)	KRKA	4.00
(Czech Republic)	Moneta Money Bank	1.49
(Romania)	BRD Groupe SG	0.84
(Austria)	Vienna Insurance Group	1.26
(Croatia)	Hrvatski Telekom	1.15
(Slovenia)	Nova Ljubljanska Banka	2.27
(Austria)	Vienna Insurance Group	1.47

== See also ==
- Economy of Hungary
- Economy of Budapest
- List of companies of Hungary
- List of European stock exchanges
- List of stock exchange opening times
- Hungarian National Bank (Securities and exchange surveillance)
