= Central and Eastern Europe Stock Exchange Group =

CEE Stock Exchange Group
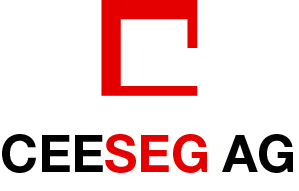
- Type: Stock and derivatives exchange
- Location: Vienna, Austria
- Founded: 2010
- Closed: 2020 Merged with Vienna Stock Exchange
- Key people: Christoph Boschan, Petr Koblic

Central and Eastern Europe Stock Exchange Group (CEESEG) was a holding company comprising the stock exchanges of Vienna and Prague until 2020. In 2020 the Vienna Stock Exchange decided to simplify its group structure and merged with the former group holding company CEESEG AG taking control of both stock exchanges.

== History ==
The CEESEG emerged as the outcome of a series of acquisitions of Central European stock exchanges by the Vienna Stock Exchange after the fall of the Iron Curtain in 1989. In addition to the investees under the umbrella of the holding company, the Vienna Stock Exchange also built up a network of cooperation exchanges in the region of Central and Southeast Europe. The cooperative ventures are mainly in the area of IT (shared trading platform), the dissemination of exchange data and the calculation of exchange indices. These synergy and the common brand make it possible for the local markets to attract international investors.

Until 2020 the holding company was responsible for the administration of the equity interests, while the day-to-day operation of the exchanges were taken care of locally by the two subsidiaries. In 2020 the Vienna Stock Exchange decided to simplify its group structure. In order to reduce expenses and costs, Wiener Börse AG merged with the former group holding company CEESEG AG. The Prague Stock Exchange became a 99.54% subsidiary of Wiener Börse AG.

== See also ==
- Wiener Börse (Vienna Stock Exchange)
- Prague Stock Exchange
