= Giuseppe Tricarico =

Italian church and opera composer

Giuseppe Tricarico (1623 in Gallipoli – 1697) was an Italian church and opera composer. He served as Kapellmeister to the dowager empress Eleonora in Vienna 1660–1663.
