= Xetra (trading system) =

Trading venue based in Germany

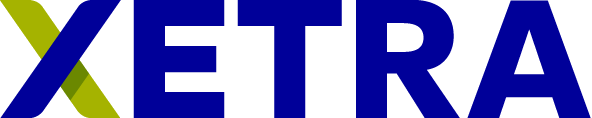
Logo

Xetra (Market Identifier Code: XETR) is a trading venue operated by the Frankfurt Stock Exchange based in Frankfurt, Germany.

In 2015, 90 percent of all trading in shares at all German exchanges was transacted through the Xetra trading venue. With regard to DAX listings, Xetra has 60 percent market share throughout Europe. Trading times on trading days are from 9.00 a.m. to 5.30 p.m. The prices on Xetra serve as the basis for calculating the DAX, the best-known German share index.

Over 200 trading participants from 16 European countries, plus Hong Kong and the United Arab Emirates, are connected via Xetra servers in Frankfurt am Main.

Given the high turnover (market liquidity) on the Xetra trading venue, orders for securities are executed swiftly and at prices in line with the market. Moreover, this principle is supported by Designated Sponsors who post binding purchase and selling prices (quotes) on a continuous basis and thus ensure additional liquidity and fair prices.

As all the exchange trading is transacted electronically, there can be partial execution of orders on the Xetra trading venue. However, banks and online brokers do not face additional transaction costs for same-day partial executions and therefore most of them do not bill their clients additionally for partial executions.

All listings are in euro including shares of secondary listings from issuers whose primary listing is in an other currency than the euro.

== Protective mechanisms and market surveillance ==
With a view to improving the continuity of prices and to avoid mistrades (clearly erroneous trades), several protective mechanisms are in place for the Xetra trading venue. These include volatility interruption, market order interruption, and liquidity interruption measures. Trading on the Xetra trading venue is governed by clear rules, which apply equally for all trading participants. Independent market surveillance is made up of the Trading Surveillance Office (HÜSt), the Exchange Supervisory Authority attached to the Hessian Ministry of Economic Affairs, Transportation, and Regional Development, and the Federal Financial Supervisory Authority (BaFin).

== Admission of securities ==
The admission of securities to the Frankfurt Stock Exchange and its trading venues Xetra and Börse Frankfurt does not require separate admission. Newly listed securities at the Xetra trading venue are automatically included in Börse Frankfurt trading.

The organising companies of the Frankfurt Stock Exchange are Deutsche Börse AG and Börse Frankfurt Zertifikate AG.

Xetra is a registered trademark of Deutsche Börse AG.

== Development ==
The Xetra trading technology was positioned as a brand product while it was still being developed. The intention was to be able to better position Xetra among trading participants and in the public eye, and to license it to other exchange operators. The trading technology of Xetra was designed and implemented on the basis of Eurex trading technology; this was undertaken on behalf of Deutsche Börse AG by Andersen Consulting (nowadays Accenture) and Deutsche Börse Systems.

== Co-operation partners ==
Through its Deutsche Börse Cash Market business section, Deutsche Börse AG in Frankfurt/Main now operates two trading venues based on the trading technology of Xetra:

- Xetra (XETR) is the reference market for German equities and exchange traded funds. Active exchange traded funds, exchange traded commodities and exchange traded notes can also be traded.
- Börse Frankfurt (XFRA), with the Börse Frankfurt Zertifikate AG (formerly Scoach) derivatives exchange, which migrated on 28 April 2008. The Börse Frankfurt trading venue was migrated to the trading technology of Xetra on 20 May 2011.

Furthermore, the trading technology of Xetra has also been in use at the Vienna Stock Exchange since November 1999. In December 2010, the Vienna Stock Exchange similarly introduced Xetra at the Ljubljana Stock Exchange. The trading technology is also in operation at the Prague Stock Exchange (since November 2012), the Budapest Stock Exchange (since December 2013), the Irish Stock Exchange (since 2000), the Bulgarian Stock Exchange (since 2008), the Malta Stock Exchange (since 2012), the Cayman Islands Stock Exchange (since 2013) and the Zagreb Stock Exchange (since 2017). Eurex Bonds, the Deutsche Börse trading platform for government bonds, relies on the trading technology of Xetra. The New Generation Trading System in operation at the Shanghai Stock Exchange was also developed on the basis of the trading technology of Xetra.

== History ==
The trading technology of Xetra replaced the Integriertes Börsenhandels- und Informations-System (IBIS) trading platform on 28 November 1997. Advocates cited execution prices in line with the market, low transaction costs, equality, geographical location, and the anonymity of trading partners in its favour. The main challenges discerned were to ensure system stability and availability, scalability, latency, and long-term growth in market activity.

The name Xetra was coined by Manfred Gotta.

Xetra Release	Release date	Description
1.0	10 June 1997	Release of the Xetra GUI frontend only, to enable the familiarisation process. The backend was still IBIS.
2.0	28 November 1997	The Xetra back-end goes operational.
2.1	30 March 1998	Minor adjustments to the frontend and backend
3.0	12 October 1998	Introduction of intraday auctions, Designated Sponsors, and stop orders. Introduction of bond and OTC trading and lowering of minimum order sizes
3.1	30 May 1999	General improvements to functionality (incl. extended volatility interruption, maximum order validity 90 days), pricing of an IPO possible for the first time
4.0	17 April 2000	Possibility of trading warrants, preparation for evening trading, improved auction transparency, several clearing accounts possible
5.0	1 October 2000	Introduction of iceberg and market-to-limit orders, as well as block crossing
6.0	30 April 2001	Functionality for the Equity Central Counterparty, intraday closing auction
6.5	19 November 2001	Change over from C++ to Java API, new Java-based frontend
7.0	20 August 2002	Introduction of Xetra BEST, abolition of the C++ frontend, enhanced performance, calculation of increased user fees in the event of possible excessive system load
7.1	3 January 2005	Market model for EEX (manual intraday auction), introduction of subscription rights trading, display of last trades possible
8.0	23 April 2007	Greater speed through split market data streams and increased caching, better transparency
8.1	22 October 2007	MiFID conformity assured in particular with regard to OTC trades executed via Xetra
9.0	28 April 2008	Introduction of certificates trading, minor changes to the front-end and a few small changes to the implemented features
9.1	24 November 2008	Introduction of trading in actively managed funds on Xetra, new “MidPoint Order” order type launched, basic multi-currency capability
10.0	18 December 2008	Changes to the market models, minor changes to the API
10.1	1 October 2009	Introduction of Xetra International Market
11.0	28 June 2010	Changes to the market models, minor changes to the API
11.1	9 May 2011	Migration of all shares and bonds previously tradable via Börse Frankfurt trading venue
12.0	28 November 2011	Interface for FIX protocol, multi-exchange capability, new order types “Strike Match” and “Top of the Book” introduced, execution of bilateral trades now possible through the Order Book
13.0	26 November 2012	New order types, improved risk management for OTC trades, more efficient access to the Xetra trading technology
14.0	30 September 2013	Adjustments in line with the German High Frequency Trading Act, introduction of system-based risk management for market makers, expansion of the FIX Gateway
15.0	1 December 2014	Expanded risk management functions
16.0	30 November 2015	Lower latency, introduction of the “Volume Discovery Order” for block trading in conformity with MiFID II, quote request for ETF orders, new optional “Self-Match Prevention” functionality
