= List of countries by unemployment rate =

Unemployment rate (2021)

This is a list of countries by unemployment rate. Methods of calculation and presentation of unemployment rate vary from country to country. Some countries count insured unemployed only, some count those in receipt of welfare benefit only, some count disabled people and other permanently unemployable people, some countries count those who choose (and are financially able) not to work, supported by their spouses and caring for a family, some count students at college and so on. There may also be differences in the minimum requirements and some consider people employed even if only marginally associated with employment market (for example, working only one hour per week).

There can be differences in the age limit. For example, Eurostat uses 15 to 74 years old when calculating unemployment rate, and the Bureau of Labor Statistics uses anyone 16 years of age or older (in both cases, people who are under education, retired, on maternity/paternity leave, prevented from working due to health, or do not work but have been inactive in seeking employment in the last four weeks are excluded from the workforce, and therefore not counted as unemployed). Unemployment rates are often seasonally adjusted to avoid variations that depend on time of year. The employment-to-population ratio or employment rate is distinct from the unemployment rate.

For purposes of comparison, harmonized values are published by International Labour Organization (ILO) and by OECD. The ILO harmonized unemployment rate refers to those who are currently not working but are willing and able to work for pay, currently available to work, and have actively searched for work. The OECD harmonized unemployment rate gives the number of unemployed persons as a percentage of the labour force. Most unemployment rates given in the table below are derived from national statistics and therefore not directly comparable.

== List ==
List of countries by unemployment rate
Country/Territory	Unemployment rate (%)			
Country/Territory	CIA (2024)	WB (2024)	IMF (2026)	GE (2024)
Afghanistan *	13.3	13.3	–	13.30
Albania *	10.3	10.3	8.7	10.25
Algeria *	11.5	11.4	–	11.43
Andorra	–	–	1.1	–
Angola *	14.5	14.5	–	14.46
Argentina *	7.9	7.9	7.2	7.88
Armenia *	13.4	13.3	12.8	13.33
Aruba	–	–	4.3	–
Australia *	4.1	4.1	4.2	4.07
Austria *	5.5	5.4	5.7	5.44
Azerbaijan *	5.6	5.6	5.3	5.59
Bahamas *	8.5	8.5	9.4	8.46
Bahrain *	1.2	1.1	–	1.10
Bangladesh *	4.7	10.27	–	5.98
Barbados *	7.6	7.5	6.8	7.53
Belarus *	3.4	3.4	2.9	3.36
Belgium *	5.5	5.5	6.2	5.49
Belize *	7.0	7.0	2.6	7.00
Benin *	1.8	1.7	–	1.72
Bhutan *	2.9	2.9	–	2.86
Bolivia *	3.1	3.1	4.5	3.09
Bosnia and Herzegovina *	10.8	10.7	12.6	10.72
Botswana *	23.2	23.1	–	23.14
Brazil *	7.7	7.6	6.8	7.63
Brunei *	5.2	5.1	4.7	5.14
Bulgaria *	4.2	4.1	3.4	4.10
Burkina Faso *	5.2	5.2	–	5.17
Burundi *	1.0	0.9	–	0.90
Cambodia *	0.3	0.3	–	0.27
Cameroon *	3.6	3.6	–	3.6
Canada *	6.5	6.5	6.5	6.45
Cape Verde *	11.9	11.9	8.5	11.88
Central African Republic *	5.9	5.9	–	5.90
Chad *	1.1	1.1	–	1.09
Channel Islands	–	6.3	–	–
Chile *	9.1	9.1	8.1	9.06
China *	4.6	4.6	5.1	4.57
Colombia *	9.7	9.6	9.0	9.61
Comoros *	3.9	3.9	–	3.88
Congo *	19.7	19.7	–	19.69
Costa Rica *	7.9	7.8	7.0	7.85
Croatia *	5.3	5.2	4.6	5.24
Cuba *	1.6	1.5	–	–
Cyprus *	5.7	5.6	4.6	5.60
Czech Republic *	2.6	2.5	3.0	2.51
Denmark *	5.6	5.6	2.9	5.59
Djibouti *	25.9	25.9	–	25.88
Dominican Republic *	5.5	5.5	5.3	5.47
DR Congo *	4.6	4.6	–	4.56
Ecuador *	4.8	4.8	3.1	4.77
Egypt *	7.2	7.2	7.4	7.20
El Salvador *	2.9	2.8	4.3	2.84
Equatorial Guinea *	7.9	7.8	–	7.82
Eritrea *	5.6	5.6	–	5.55
Estonia *	7.9	7.8	7.3	7.83
Eswatini *	34.4	34.4	–	34.40
Ethiopia *	3.4	3.4	–	3.40
Fiji *	4.4	4.3	5.0	4.31
Finland *	8.3	8.3	9.6	8.26
France *	7.4	7.4	7.9	7.37
French Polynesia *	11.8	11.8	–	–
Gabon *	20.1	20.1	–	20.06
Gambia *	6.5	6.5	–	6.50
Georgia *	11.5	11.5	13.9	11.48
Germany *	3.5	3.4	3.9	3.41
Ghana *	3.1	3.0	–	3.01
Greece *	10.2	10.1	7.4	10.13
Guam *	5.6	5.6	–	–
Guatemala *	2.3	2.2	–	2.22
Guernsey *	6.3	–	–	–
Guinea *	5.3	5.2	–	5.23
Guinea-Bissau *	2.7	2.6	–	2.62
Guyana *	10.2	10.2	–	10.16
Haiti *	15.1	15.1	–	15.06
Honduras *	6.1	6.1	6.8	6.06
Hong Kong *	2.8	2.8	3.3	2.79
Hungary *	4.5	4.4	4.2	4.43
Iceland *	3.2	3.1	4.2	3.11
India *	4.3	4.2	4.9	4.20
Indonesia *	3.3	3.3	4.9	3.30
Iran *	9.2	9.2	9.2	9.19
Iraq *	15.6	15.5	–	15.52
Ireland *	4.4	4.4	4.8	4.37
Israel *	3.2	3.1	3.2	3.15
Italy *	6.8	6.8	6.0	6.78
Ivory Coast *	2.3	2.3	–	2.29
Jamaica *	4.9	4.9	–	4.89
Japan *	2.6	2.6	2.5	2.56
Jersey *	6.3	–	–	–
Jordan *	18.0	18.0	21.3	18.00
Kazakhstan *	4.8	4.8	4.6	4.79
Kenya *	5.5	5.4	–	5.43
Kuwait *	2.2	2.1	–	2.14
Kyrgyzstan *	3.3	3.3	4.0	3.29
Laos *	1.3	1.2	–	1.22
Latvia *	6.8	6.7	6.7	6.72
Lesotho *	16.2	16.1	–	16.15
Liberia *	2.9	2.9	–	2.88
Libya *	18.7	18.6	–	18.61
Liechtenstein	–	–	3.9	–
Lithuania *	7.6	7.5	6.5	7.50
Luxembourg *	6.0	5.9	5.9	5.93
Macau *	2.5	2.4	1.7	2.44
Madagascar *	3.1	3.0	–	3.01
Malawi *	5.1	5.0	–	5.05
Malaysia *	3.9	3.8	3.0	3.83
Maldives *	4.7	4.6	–	4.64
Mali *	3.1	3.1	–	3.06
Malta *	2.8	2.7	3.0	2.70
Mauritania *	10.4	10.4	–	10.37
Mauritius *	5.5	5.5	5.9	5.48
Mexico *	2.8	2.7	2.7	2.71
Moldova *	1.5	1.4	3.8	1.43
Mongolia *	5.5	5.4	5.0	5.42
Montenegro *	14.1	14.1	–	14.10
Morocco *	9.0	8.9	12.2	8.94
Mozambique *	3.6	3.5	–	3.53
Myanmar *	3.1	3.0	–	3.03
Namibia *	19.2	19.1	–	19.15
Nepal *	10.8	10.7	–	10.71
Netherlands *	3.6	3.6	4.1	3.60
New Caledonia *	11.2	11.2	–	11.15
New Zealand *	4.9	4.9	5.4	4.87
Nicaragua *	4.6	4.6	2.7	4.57
Niger *	0.4	0.4	–	0.35
Nigeria *	3.0	3.0	–	2.99
North Korea *	2.9	2.9	–	2.86
North Macedonia *	13.5	13.4	11.5	13.42
Norway *	4.0	4.0	4.2	3.97
Oman *	3.2	3.2	–	3.16
Pakistan *	5.5	5.5	6.9	5.47
Panama *	6.6	6.5	10.4	6.52
Papua New Guinea *	2.8	2.7	–	2.74
Paraguay *	6.1	6.1	5.2	6.09
Peru *	4.9	4.8	6.3	4.83
Philippines *	2.2	2.2	4.7	2.15
Poland *	2.5	2.5	3.4	2.47
Portugal *	6.4	6.4	5.9	6.38
Puerto Rico *	5.5	5.5	6.0	5.47
Qatar *	0.2	0.1	–	0.13
Romania *	5.4	5.4	6.0	5.38
Russia *	2.6	2.5	2.4	2.53
Rwanda *	12.0	12.0	–	11.99
Saint Lucia *	11.0	10.9	–	10.93
Saint Vincent and the Grenadines *	18.1	18.1	–	18.06
Samoa *	4.6	4.6	–	4.55
San Marino	–	–	4.4	–
São Tomé and Príncipe *	9.2	9.2	–	9.17
Saudi Arabia *	3.9	3.9	–	3.90
Senegal *	3.0	3.0	–	2.99
Serbia *	7.4	7.4	8.8	7.39
Seychelles	–	–	2.6	–
Sierra Leone *	3.2	3.1	–	3.13
Singapore *	3.2	3.2	2.0	3.18
Slovakia *	5.3	5.2	5.8	5.23
Slovenia *	3.4	3.4	3.9	3.36
Solomon Islands *	1.5	1.5	–	1.47
Somalia *	18.9	18.9	–	18.86
South Africa *	33.2	33.2	32.5	33.17
South Korea *	2.7	2.6	2.8	2.60
Spain *	9.93	9.93	9.8	9.93
Sri Lanka *	5.0	5.0	–	5.00
Sudan	–	–	61.3	–
Suriname *	7.4	7.3	9.0	7.32
Sweden *	8.6	8.5	8.6	8.53
Switzerland *	4.2	4.1	3.0	4.11
Syria *	13.0	13.0	–	12.96
Taiwan *	3.4	–	3.4	–
Tajikistan *	11.7	11.6	–	11.64
Tanzania *	2.6	2.6	–	2.58
Thailand *	0.7	0.7	1.0	0.69
Timor-Leste *	1.7	1.6	–	–
Togo *	2.0	1.9	–	1.94
Tonga *	2.2	2.2	–	2.19
Trinidad and Tobago *	4.6	4.5	4.2	4.55
Tunisia *	16.3	16.2	–	16.20
Turkey *	8.5	8.4	8.3	8.45
Turkmenistan *	4.4	4.3	–	4.30
Uganda *	3.0	2.9	–	2.94
Ukraine	–	–	10.2	–
United Arab Emirates *	2.2	2.1	–	2.13
United Kingdom *	4.2	4.1	5.6	4.11
United States *	4.2	4.1	4.4	4.11
Uruguay *	8.5	8.4	8.0	8.40
U.S. Virgin Islands *	12.1	12.0	–	–
Uzbekistan *	4.5	4.5	4.3	4.49
Vanuatu *	5.1	5.1	–	5.06
Venezuela *	5.5	5.5	–	5.47
Vietnam *	1.5	1.4	2.1	1.43
Yemen *	17.1	17.1	–	17.09
Zambia *	6.0	6.0	–	5.96
Zimbabwe *	8.6	8.6	–	8.55
World	–	4.9	–	–

* indicates "Unemployment in COUNTRY or TERRITORY" or "Economy of COUNTRY or TERRITORY" links.

== OECD ==
* indicates "Economy of COUNTRY or TERRITORY" links.

OECD: Nov 2023 or latest available
Country	Total	15–24 year-olds	25–70 year-olds
Colombia *	10.2	21.6	8.4
Spain *	9.93	23.01	8.93
Greece *	9.6	23.7	8.7
Chile *	8.8	21.6	7.8
Turkey *	8.5	16.3	7.1
Sweden *	7.9	21.7	6.1
Italy *	7.8	24.7	6.7
Costa Rica *	7.7	22.4	5.6
Finland *	7.5	18.9	6.0
France *	7.3	17.7	6.0
Portugal *	6.7	20.8	5.6
Latvia *	6.5	13.9	5.9
Lithuania *	6.5	13.3	5.9
Estonia *	6.3	20.7	5.1
Slovakia *	5.8	20.8	5.0
Canada *	5.8	11.6	4.8
Belgium *	5.6	17.5	4.3
Luxembourg *	5.5	19.3	4.4
Denmark *	5.4	14.0	3.9
Austria *	5.1	10.5	4.4
Ireland *	4.8	12.5	3.6
New Zealand *	4.8	14.1	3.2
United Kingdom *	4.3	12.7	3.1
Switzerland *	4.3	8.2	3.8
Hungary *	4.1	13.5	3.4
Slovenia *	4.1	11.8	3.4
Australia *	3.9	9.6	2.7
United States *	3.7	8.1	3.1
Norway *	3.6	11.1	2.4
Netherlands *	3.6	8.4	2.5
Iceland *	3.5	9.1	2.5
Israel *	3.1	6.5	2.9
Germany *	3.1	5.6	2.8
Czech Republic *	2.9	7.1	2.6
Poland *	2.8	10.5	2.3
South Korea *	2.8	6.4	2.6
Mexico *	2.7	5.4	2.1
Japan *	2.5	3.8	2.4
European Union (27 countries, 2020)	6.0	14.9	5.2
OECD - Total	4.8	10.7	4.1
G7	4.2	9.6	3.5

== See also ==
- List of sovereign states by employment rate
