= List of countries by employment rate =

This is a list of countries by employment rate, the proportion of employed adults at working age. The definition of "working age" varies: Many sources, including the OECD, use 15–64 years old, but EUROSTAT uses 20–64 years old, the United States Bureau of Labor Statistics uses 16 years old and older (no cut-off at 65 and up), and the Office for National Statistics of the United Kingdom uses 16–64 years old.

== List ==
* indicates "Unemployment in COUNTRY or TERRITORY" links.

Employment rate by country (ages 15–64)
Country	Rate (%)	Year	Source
Iceland	86.2	Q3 2025	
Netherlands	82.4	Q3 2025	
Malta *	81.3	Q3 2025	
Switzerland	79.8	Q3 2025	
Japan	79.3	Q2 2024	
New Zealand *	78.6	2024	
Cyprus	77.5	Q3 2025	
Sweden *	77.4	Q3 2025	
Australia *	77.1	2024	
Germany	77.1	Q3 2025	
Denmark *	77.1	Q3 2025	
Norway	77.0	Q3 2025	
Estonia *	76.7	Q3 2025	
Czech Republic	76.0	Q3 2025	
Singapore	75.5	2024	ILO
Hungary *	75.4	Q3 2025	
China *	75.1	2010	OECD
Lithuania	75.1	Q3 2025	
Thailand	75.0	2024	ILO
Austria	75.0	Q3 2025	
Canada *	74.7	2024	
Ireland	74.7	Q3 2025	
United Kingdom *	74.5	Q2 2024	
Portugal *	74.5	Q3 2025	
Slovenia	73.4	Q3 2025	
Poland *	73.3	Q3 2025	
Latvia	72.7	Q3 2025	
Finland *	72.3	Q3 2025	
Slovakia *	72.2	Q3 2025	
Russia *	72.2	2021	OECD
United States *	71.9	Q2 2024	
Bulgaria *	71.4	Q3 2025	
OECD Average	70.3	2024	
South Korea *	69.9	Q3 2025	
Luxembourg	69.5	Q3 2025	
France *	69.6	Q3 2025	
Croatia *	69.4	Q3 2025	
Israel	69.3	Q3 2025	
Serbia	68.3	2024	ILO
Belgium *	67.4	Q3 2025	
Spain *	67.4	Q3 2025	
Argentina	67.2	2023	OECD
Albania	67.0	2024	ILO
Georgia	66.3	2024	ILO
Ecuador	66.2	2025	ILO
Brazil *	66.1	2024	ILO
Indonesia	65.9	2019	OECD
Greece *	65.6	Q3 2025	
Saudi Arabia	65.2	2024	ILO
Ukraine	65.1	2024	ILO
Armenia	64.4	2023	ILO
Colombia	64.4	Q3 2025	
Chile *	64.2	2024	
Montenegro	64.2	2024	ILO
Romania	63.4	Q3 2025	
Mexico *	63.1	Q3 2025	
Italy	62.5	Q3 2025	
Philippines	61.3	2024	ILO
Costa Rica	61.0	2024	
Bangladesh	58.6	2024	ILO
Bosnia and Herzegovina	57.5	2024	ILO
India *	56.4	2024	OECD
Turkey *	55.2	2024	ILO
North Macedonia	54.7	2020	OECD
Pakistan	53.3	2025	ILO
Moldova	47.6	Q2 2021	
Egypt	47.0	2024	ILO
South Africa *	40.8	2024	OECD
Kosovo	39.0	2024	ILO
Palestine	32.9	2024	ILO

== See also ==
- List of U.S. states by employment rate
- List of countries by unemployment rate
- Female labor force in the Muslim world
