= List of Hungarian counties by GDP =

This is a list of Hungarian Counties by GDP and GDP per capita.

== List of Counties by GDP ==
Counties by GDP in 2022 according to data by the OECD.

Rank	County	GDP in mil HUF	GDP in mil USD (PPP)
1	Budapest	24 229 964	154 386
2	Pest	7 791 185	49 643
3	Győr-Moson-Sopron	3 366 057	21 447
4	Fejér	2 936 943	18 713
5	Borsod-Abaúj-Zemplén	2 893 427	18 436
6	Hajdú-Bihar	2 632 698	16 775
7	Bács-Kiskun	2 565 241	16 345
8	Csongrád-Csanád	2 142 356	13 650
9	Szabolcs-Szatmár-Bereg	2 132 051	13 585
10	Komárom-Esztergom	1 903 519	12 129
11	Veszprém	1 841 257	11 732
12	Baranya	1 694 605	10 797
13	Jász-Nagykun-Szolnok	1 579 668	10 065
14	Vas	1 422 240	9 062
15	Heves	1 418 129	9 036
16	Zala	1 305 973	8 321
17	Békés	1 304 663	8 313
18	Somogy	1 275 494	8 127
19	Tolna	1 066 952	6 798
20	Nógrád	572 767	3 649
	Hungary	66 075 189	421 009

== List of Counties by GDP per capita ==
Counties by GDP per capita in 2022 according to data by the OECD.

Rank	County	GDP per capita in HUF	GDP per capita in USD (PPP)
1	Budapest	14 346 340	91 410
2	Győr-Moson-Sopron	7 081 517	45 121
3	Fejér	7 008 408	44 655
4	Komárom-Esztergom	6 345 698	40 433
5	Pest	5 871 676	37 412
6	Vas	5 652 334	36 015
7	Csongrád-Csanád	5 462 965	34 808
8	Veszprém	5 434 322	34 626
9	Bács-Kiskun	5 170 710	32 946
10	Tolna	5 090 178	32 433
11	Hajdú-Bihar	5 039 043	32 107
12	Zala	4 964 355	31 631
13	Heves	4 911 439	31 294
14	Baranya	4 775 823	30 430
15	Borsod-Abaúj-Zemplén	4 626 892	29 481
16	Jász-Nagykun-Szolnok	4 408 047	28 087
17	Somogy	4 293 871	27 359
18	Békés	4 094 987	26 092
19	Szabolcs-Szatmár-Bereg	3 995 897	25 461
20	Nógrád	3 115 572	19 851
	Hungary	6 838 360	43 572
