= Export performance =

Export performance is the relative success or failure of the efforts of a firm or nation to sell domestically-produced goods and services in other nations.

Export performance can be described in objective terms such as sales, profits, or marketing measures or by subjective measures such as distributor or customer satisfaction.

== See also ==
- Performance improvement

== External links and references ==
See a review of the literature:

- Article from Academy of Marketing Science Review

See two empirical articles from Journal of International Marketing:

Lages, Luis Filipe, Carmen Lages & Cristiana Raquel Lages (2005), "Bringing export performance metrics into annual reports: The APEV scale and the PERFEX scorecard." Journal of International Marketing, 13(3), 79-104.

Lages, Luis Filipe & Cristiana Raquel Lages (2004), "The STEP scale: A measure of short-term export performance improvement." Journal of International Marketing, 12(1), 36-56.
