= Hungary and the International Monetary Fund =

Location of Hungary in Europe

Hungary and the International Monetary Fund are the international relations between Hungary and the International Monetary Fund (IMF). Hungary joined the IMF on May 6, 1982. Since joining, Hungary has requested and been approved to many IMF loans. Its quota as of 2018, is 1,940 million SDR. The country has had eight loan agreements with the IMF in the past, but most recently has received only Stand-by arrangements and currently has no outstanding payments. The most recent Stand-by loan arrangement was approved in 2008 to avoid a deepening of financial market pressures of the 2008 financial crisis and was repaid ahead of schedule in 2013.

== 1960s-1980s ==
In late 1960s Hungary's economy was often referred to as "the happiest barrack" within the Eastern Bloc. The country's GDP per capita was outperforming the neighboring states. The more liberal economy approach that has been introduced with the New Economic Mechanism in 1968, along with other reforms had resulted in a relatively higher standard of living, as compared to other Soviet-bloc states. However, the early 1980s recession has affected the Hungarian economy as well. As the crisis began to sweep through Eastern Europe, Poland and Romania failed to keep up with their credit repayments. Hungary was unable to respond to the external shocks adequately, and the country's creditworthiness and appeal to foreign investors began to worsen.

== 1980s-2000s ==
To prevent a financial collapse, the Hungarian government reached out to the IMF in 1982, and after three days of reaching out, Hungary became the second Soviet-bloc member to join the fund. After receiving financial and structural assistance, Hungary's economy stabilized, however, due to high domestic expenditures, and high external debts, Hungary was affected by the recession of the 1990s. High taxation and inefficiency in the public sector further damaged the Hungarian economy, leading to a significant, 10% deficit in the 1993-1994 GDP. Hungary began the consultation with the IMF to receive financial assistance, as well as guidance for structural reform. The government started the reform by devaluating the Hungarian currency, adjusting the policies in the public sector.

== 2000s-Present ==
After completing the repayment of the most recent Stand-by agreement in 2013, Hungary has not requested any further arrangements from the Fund. Furthermore, following a set of controversial reforms after his election, Hungary's prime minister Viktor Orbán has also asked for the closure of the IMF's office in Budapest.

Despite the office closure, the IMF still provides interim country reports and remarks. According to the 2018 Article IV country report, Hungary is showing a 4% projected growth in GDP, a modest decline in national debt and a continuous yearly decrease of around 10% in its international debt. Hungary's current position is correlating with the desirable policies and fundamentals of the IMF. However, the Article suggests the need for improvement in productivity and market competitiveness.
