= Unemployment in Hungary =

Causes and measures of Hungarian unemployment

Unemployment in Hungary measured by the Hungarian Central Statistical Office (Központi Statisztikai Hivatal, KSH) shows the rate of unemployed individuals out of the labor force. The European Union's own statistical office, Eurostat also makes reports and predictions about the Hungarian job market and the unemployment rate in the country. The KSH's most recent unemployment data shows the unemployment rate for men 15–74 to be 3.3% and 4.1% for women.

Article XII in Hungary's Constitution states: '(2) Hungary seeks to create the conditions for all people who have the ability to work and want to work to get work.' Furthermore, stands in Article XVIII: '(2) Hungary provides specific measures for the protection of young people and parents at work.' As well as according to Article XIX: '(1) Hungary seeks to provide social security for all of its citizens. In the case of maternity, sickness, disability, widowhood, orphanage and involuntary unemployment, all Hungarian citizens are entitled to a statutory allowance. "

== Unemployment benefits ==
To qualify for unemployment benefits in Hungary, a person must first qualify and be registered with their local County Government Office as a job-seeker. To qualify as a job-seeker, an individual must not be a full-time student, person seeking old-age pension, or receiving steady supplemental income. Once a job-seeker is verified to have worked at least 360 days in the past 3 years, they can receive 1 day's benefits for every 10 days worked. Job-seekers are entitled to pay at 60% of their previous average wage for a minimum 36 days and maximum 90 days, or at 130% of the minimum wage if the worker's average wage cannot be calculated.

Hungary implements both active and passive labor market policies to bring workers back into the labor market. Active labor market policy tools include job search tips, career counseling, local job offers, while passive tools include offering training or business start-up programs. Job-seekers that enroll in training programs are paid minimum wage through completion of the program. Employers are actively involved in many job training programs in order to both ensure that employees are being accurately trained and that they will be secured a job at that site.

== Public Works Scheme (PWS) ==
Following the 2008 financial crisis, Hungary created the Public Works Scheme (PWS) in 2010 to bring long-term unemployed individuals, particularly those with little to no education or professional skills, back into the labor market. Public employment programmes typically last 12 months, but can be extended by 6 months if necessary. Though wages for public employment are between social welfare levels and the minimum wage, employees are still eligible for social insurance and pensions.

Funding for public employment programs is granted based on each individual county's labor market performance and allocated to county's that may need more assistance. Public works programs may including road maintenance, agricultural tending, water drainage, or eliminating illegal waste dumps. Despite the good intention, surveys have shown that public works programs are not as effective as initially thought and may be trapping employees in low-wage low-skill work.

In late 2018, Hungary faced an extreme labor shortage and reached its lowest unemployment rate in 40 years. As a result, the private sector began seeking out "fostered workers", those on public employment, leading to a nearly 20% drop in workers on public employment.

== Employment discrimination for Roma ==
Roma in Hungary face employment discrimination, poverty, and social exclusion. Nearly one third of Roma are unemployed and two thirds are in low-skill or semi-skilled jobs. These unemployment rates can fluctuate from three to five times the unemployment rate for non-Roma. Roma often face employment discrimination in local labour offices, where they may not be allowed to apply for jobs or labour office officials adhere to employer's requests to not refer Roma job-seekers. In 2014, the Commissioner for Human Rights on the Council of Europe raised concerns that Roma in Hungary were not being given the opportunity to break out of cycles of poverty.

== See also ==
- Economy of Hungary
- Demographics of Hungary

== Sources ==
- Fundamental Law of Hungary
