= List of companies based in Budapest =

This is a list of major corporations headquartered or operating in Budapest, Hungary. The table is arranged alphabetically by company, but can also be sorted by industry.

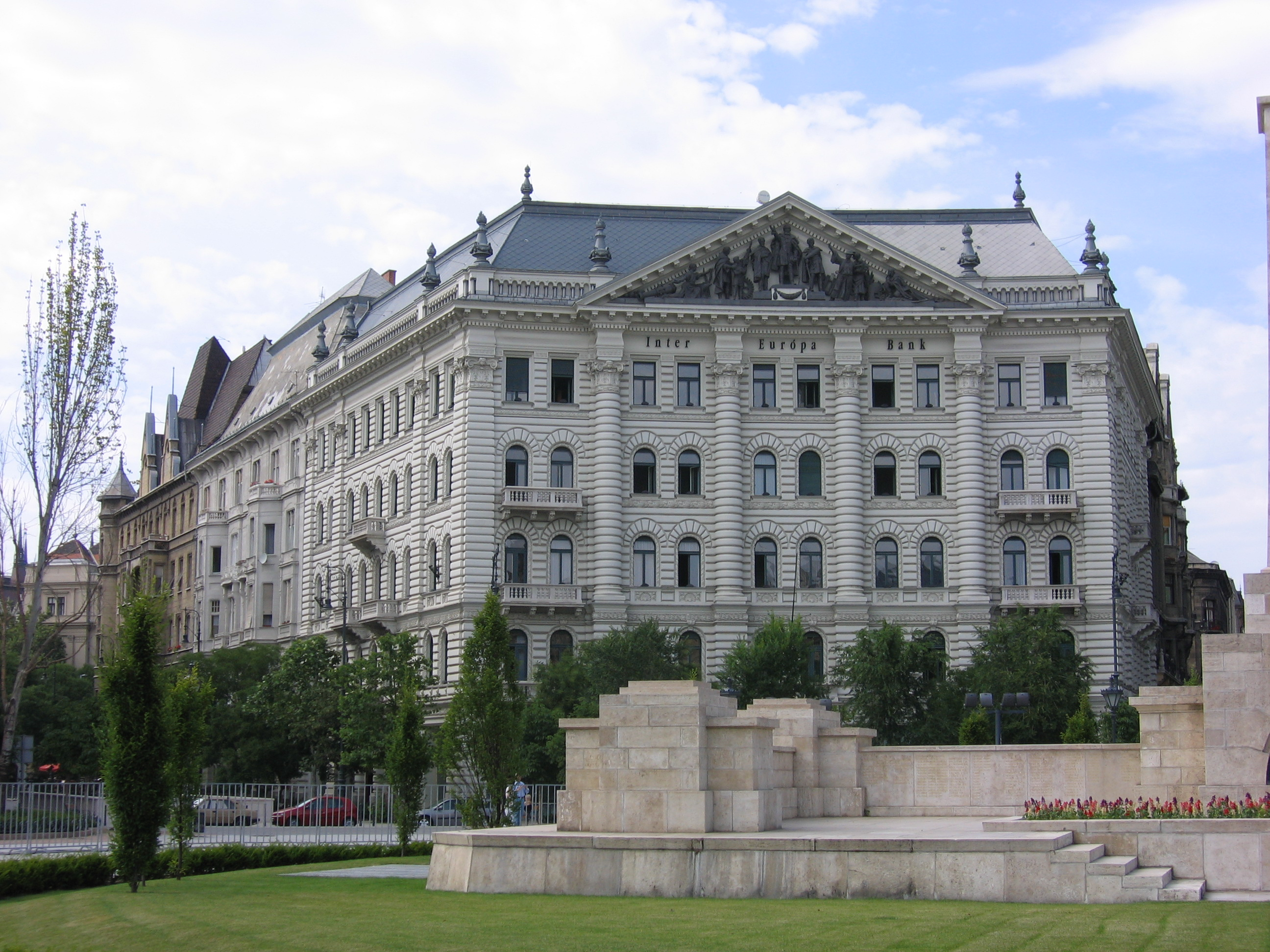
Seat of CIB Bank, the former Inter-Europe bank at Budapest Liberty Square.

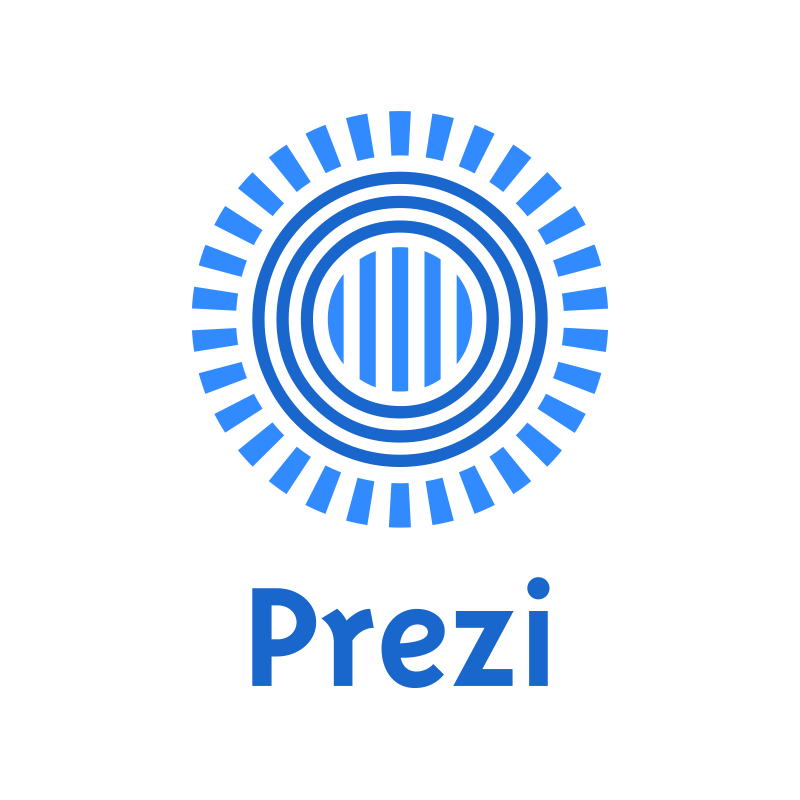
The logo of Prezi is one of the most well-known brand of Budapest's start-ups.

List of Companies	Classification
Alcoa	metal mining
Cloudera	Platform for machine learning and advanced analytics built on the latest open source technologies optimised for the cloud
MVM Group	energy industry
Mondelez International	Retail food
General Motors	automotive
BT Group	telecommunications
Flextronics	electronics
Panasonic Corp	electronics
Huawei	information technology
Tata Consultancy	consulting
Aegon	insurance
Nissan CEE	automotive
Volvo	automotive
Toyota	automotive
Saab	automotive
Ford	automotive
GE Capital	financial services
Sberbank	financial services
ING Group	financial services
Allianz	insurance
KBC Group	financial services
UniCredit	financial services
Bank of China	financial services
KDB Bank	financial services
Hanwha Bank	financial services
MOL Group	oil and gas
OTP Bank Group	financial services
FHB Bank	financial services
Gedeon Richter	biotechnology
Magyar Telekom	telecommunications
CIG Pannonia	insurance
Rába	automotive
Nokia	telecommunications
Ericsson	telecommunications
Continental	automotive supplier
Bosch	electronics
Microsoft	information technology
IBM	information technology
Teva	biotechnology
Novartis	biotechnology
Sanofi	biotechnology
American International Group	insurance
Avon Products	fashion
BlackRock	financial services
Bloomberg	business services
Citigroup	financial services
Cushman & Wakefield	real estate
Chevrolet	automotive
Diageo	beverages
Getronics	software development
Knorr-Bremse	general industrials
Norbert Dentressangle	logistics
SEI Investments Company	financial services
SIA Central Europe	financial services
Syngenta	agribusiness
Visteon	general industrials
Glencore	agribusiness
PricewaterhouseCoopers	accounting
Deloitte	accounting
Deutsche Bank	financial services
Ernst & Young	accounting
Estée Lauder Companies	fashion
KPMG	accounting
Marvel Entertainment	media
McKinsey & Company	consulting
MetLife	insurance
Moody's	business services
Morgan Stanley	financial services
MSCI	financial services
BDO International	accounting
MTV Networks	media
Liberty Global	media
CLS Music	music
Gramy Records	music
Hungaroton	music
Hunnia Film Studio	film
Pannonia Film Studio	film
Corvin Film	film
Time Warner	media
CIB Bank	financial services
Hungarian National Bank	central bank
International Training Center for Bankers	education
K&H Bank	financial services
MKB Bank	financial services
CBA	retail food
Borsod Brewery	beverages
Dreher Brewery	beverages
Győri Keksz	retail food
Pick Szeged	retail food
Törley	retail champagne
Traubi	retail food
Zwack	beverages
MAL Hungarian Aluminium	metal mining
Csepel (automobile)	automotive
Ganz Works	automotive
Ikarus Bus	automotive
Voestalpine	automotive
Vienna Insurance Group	insurance
Wienerberger	general industrials
Strabag	real estate
OMV	oil and gas
Raiffeisen International	financial services
Erste Bank	financial services
Andritz	general industrials
Samsung	electronics
LG	electronics
Misys	software development
EDF Energy	oil and gas
Nav N Go	software development
Inditex	fashion
BP	oil and gas
ExxonMobil	oil and gas
British American Tobacco	tobacco
British Airways	airlines
ThyssenKrupp	conglomerates
Pfizer	biotechnology
Philip Morris International	tobacco
Calvin Klein	fashion
Ralph Lauren	fashion
Reader's Digest Association	media
Rockstar Games	video games
Sony Music Entertainment	media
Thomson Reuters	media
Tiffany & Co	retail
Universal Music Group	media
Viacom	media
Digital Reality	video games
Graphisoft	software development
Invictus Games	video games
LogMeIn	software development
NeocoreGames	video games
Prezi	visual storytelling software development
VirusBuster	Information Technology Security Services
Zen Studios	video games
General Electric	conglomerates
Corvus Hungary	aerospace
BorsodChem	chemicals
Magyar Posta	postal services
TriGránit	real estate
Zsolnay	retail manufacturer
Budapest Aircraft Service	airlines
Cinema City Hungary	entertainment
CityLine Hungary	airlines
Danubius Hotels Group	tourism
Farnair Hungary	airlines
Gundel	restaurant
Szerencsejáték Zrt.	gambling industry
Travel Service	airlines
Wizz Air	airlines
Budapest Stock Exchange	financial exchanges
Hungarian Power Exchange	energy exchanges
SAP	software development
Lightware	audiovisual manufacturer

== See also ==
- Economy of Budapest
- Economy of Hungary
- List of companies of Hungary
