= Csepel D-350 =

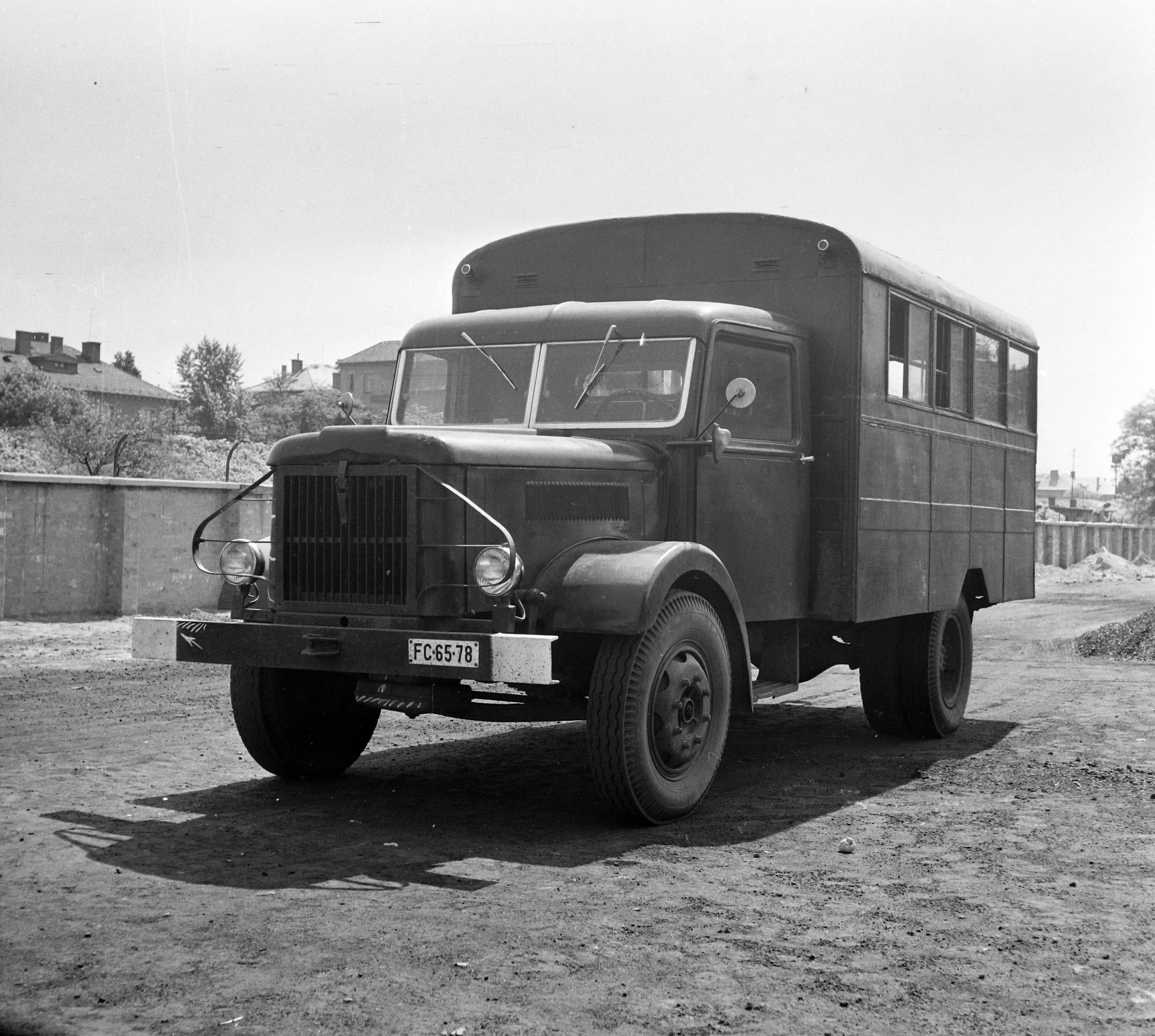
- A Csepel D-350-based bus

Overview
- Manufacturer: Csepel Autógyár
- Production: 1 February 1950 – 1958
- Assembly: Szigethalom, Hungary

Body and chassis
- Class: 3.5 tonne lorry
- Body style: bonnet lorry
- Layout: front engine, rear-wheel drive
- Platform: Steyr 380
- Related: Steyr 380

Powertrain
- Engine: Csepel D 413, Diesel, 5.3 dm³, 63 kW
- Transmission: five-speed manual gearbox
- Propulsion: air-filled tyres

Dimensions
- Wheelbase: 3,710 mm (146.1 in)
- Length: 6,735 mm (265.2 in)
- Width: 2,260 mm (89.0 in)
- Height: 2,740 mm (107.9 in)
- Kerb weight: 3,200 kg (7,055 lb)

Chronology
- Predecessor: none
- Successor: Csepel D-420

The Csepel D-350 is a lorry made by Hungarian manufacturer Csepel Autógyár from 1950 until 1958. It was the first series production Csepel vehicle, and a copy of the Austrian Steyr 380 lorry, built under licence.

== History ==
After World War II, Hungarian Center of Heavy Industy (Nehézipari Központ – NIK) acquired a licence for the Steyr 380 lorry, the Steyr WD-413 and WD-613 diesel engines, as well as the Steyr industrial four-cylinder petrol engine. At the time, the Steyr factory was in the Soviet occupied zone in Austria, and under Soviet control. Dezső Rankasz argues that the plans for the Steyr 380 lorry were effectively "taken over". The licence contract with Steyr was originally supposed to include a licence for the Steyr 180 agricultural tractor, but eventually, NIK acquired a licence for Steyr's WD-613 8-litre, six-cylinder diesel engine instead, because of the high power output it could provide for military vehicles. The contract also included a term which effectively transferred the rights to the Steyr patents – that were licensed in the contract – to the Hungarian state, from 1959 onwards, for a fee of US$380,000. This later allowed Csepel Autógyár to build modified versions of the original WD-413 engine.

On 3 November 1949, it was officially decided to establish a lorry factory in Szigethalom on Csepel Island, in a former 180 hm^{2} (2,200,000 yd^{2}) aircraft factory. Mihály Zsofinyecz, Hungarian minister of heavy industries, formally accepted the plans for the factory on 18 November 1949. It was registered as a national company on 21 November 1949. The wife of Ferenc Bíró, herself an engineer, served as the factory's first managing director.

The first engine, a Csepel D 413 four-cylinder diesel engine, was assembled on 21 December 1949; the first three lorries left the factory on 4 April 1950. At the time, the vehicle was still being hand-made, with several parts supplied and assembled by other vehicle manufacturers; the chassis was made by MVG in Győr, and the cab was made by Ikarus. Approximately the first 1000 engines made at Csepel Autógyár were assembled from Austrian-made parts. Production ended in 1958.

== Technical description ==
The Csepel D-350 is a copy of the Steyr 380, and thus shares many technical characteristics with the aforementioned lorry. The design is a conventional body-on-frame design with two axles, and a front engine. In front, the D-350 has single wheels, and in rear it has twin wheels; all wheels were fitted with 8.25 by 20 inch tyres, and hydraulically operated brake drums. Except for a single prototype, all Csepel D-350 lorries are rear-wheel drive.

Several different versions of the D-350 were made, in short- and long wheelbase forms, with the long-wheelbase, flatbed version being the most common. It has a wheelbase of 3710 mm, a length of 6735 mm, a width of 2260 mm, a height of 2740 mm, and a fording depth of 255 mm. The track width is 1740 mm in front, and 1650 mm in rear. The Csepel's mass is 3200 kg, and it has a payload of 3500 kg. The maximum permissible trailer payload is also 3500 kg. The flatbed measures 3920 by 2100 mm. The lorry can approach angles of up to 21° up front, and 17° up rear; the turning diameter measures 16.8 m. The specific ground pressure is 2.6 kp/cm^{2} (0.25 MPa).

Csepel Autógyár built versions of the D-350 with Otto (spark ignition) and Diesel (compression ignition) engines, albeit that the diesel versions were much more common. The diesel engine used is a Csepel D 413 four-cylinder OHV diesel engine, a direct copy of the Steyr WD 413 engine. It has a reverse-flow cylinder head, pre-combustion chamber injection, and is naturally aspirated. With its bore of 110 mm, and the stroke of 140 mm, it displaces 5322 cm^{3}. The rated power (DIN 70020) is 85 PS (63 kW) at 2200/min, the maximum torque of 30 kp·m (294 N·m) is reached at 1400/min. The lowest fuel consumption of 200 g/(PS·h) (272 g/(kW·h)) is reached at 1700/min, where the engine produces about 70 PS (51 kW).

The torque is sent from the engine through a single-disc dry clutch to a non-synchromesh five-speed manual gearbox. The top speed is 73.2 km/h in fifth gear. In a 1951 test, the average fuel consumption was found to be 20.3 L/100 km, with the lowest fuel consumption being 15.39 L/100 km on a flat concrete road at a speed of 50 km/h.

Throughout the vehicle's production run, various changes were made to the technical design, proposed by the Hungarian Vehicle Development Institute (JÁFI). The original Steyr-designed pistons were prone to failure, and thus soon replaced by pistons with an increased surface area and relocated upper piston ring groove, improving the overall wall thickness design. The sealing of the engine's pushrods was also improved, as well as the fan shaft nut's washer, and the securing of the clutch release lever.
