= Rába U26 =

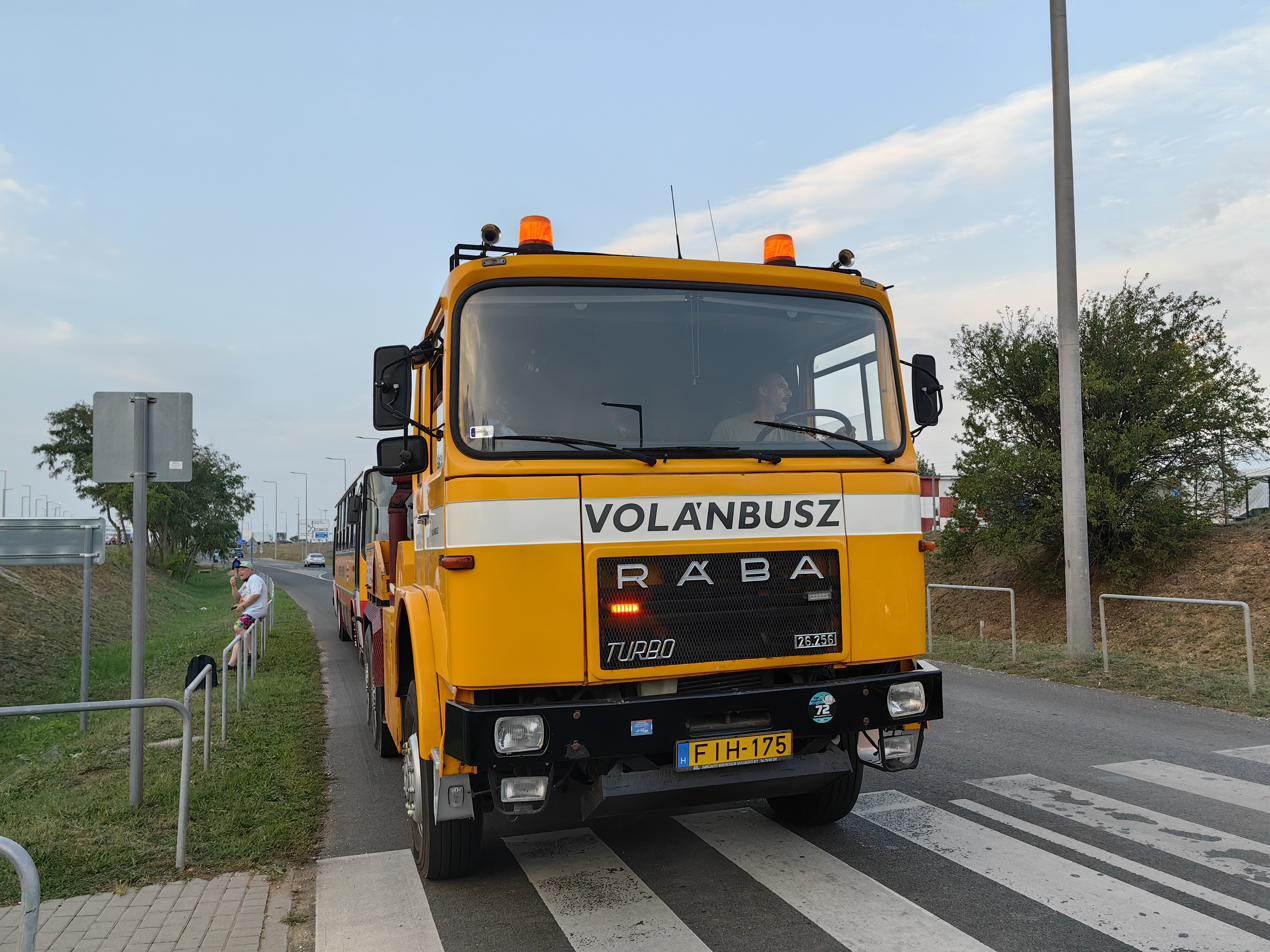

Overview
- Production: 1970–1990

The Rába U26 series was a family of heavy-duty trucks built by the Hungarian manufacturer RÁBA, primarily during the 1970s and 1980s. These models included a base version (U26) and a more powerful military variant designated U26.256.

== Overview ==
The cab used on the Rába U26.256 (and several other Rába trucks from that era) was licensed from the Romanian company ROMAN, which itself was producing vehicles based on MAN designs from the late 1960s and 1970s.

The angular, forward-control cab seen on the U26.256 is nearly identical to that found on Roman Diesel models like the Roman 19.215 or Roman 26.215, especially in military and heavy-haul configurations.
