= Audiovisual art =

Abstract art and music or sound set in relation to each other

Audiovisual art is the exploration of kinetic abstract art and music or sound set in relation to each other. It includes visual music, abstract film, audiovisual performances and installations.

== Overview ==
The book Art and the Senses cites the Italian Futurist artists, Fortunato Depero and Luigi Russolo as designing art machines in 1915 to create a multisensory experience of sound, movement and colour. In the 1970s Harry Bertoia created sound sculptures of objects to have a multisensory effect, exploring the relationships between the sound, the initiating event and the material properties of the objects. In an example with overt musical connections, The Oxford Handbook of New Audiovisual Aesthetics cites musician Brian Williams (a.k.a. Lustmord) as someone whose practise crosses audiovisual art and mainstream media, where his work is "not traditionally 'musical'" and has "clearly visual aspects".

== See also ==
- Abstract film
- Audiovisualogy
- Color organ
- Experimental film
- Sound art
- Sound installation
- Sound sculpture
- Synaesthesia
- Video art
- Visual music
- Audiovisual performance
- New media art
