= Volvo L3314 =

Swedish military vehicle family

Volvo L3314/C202
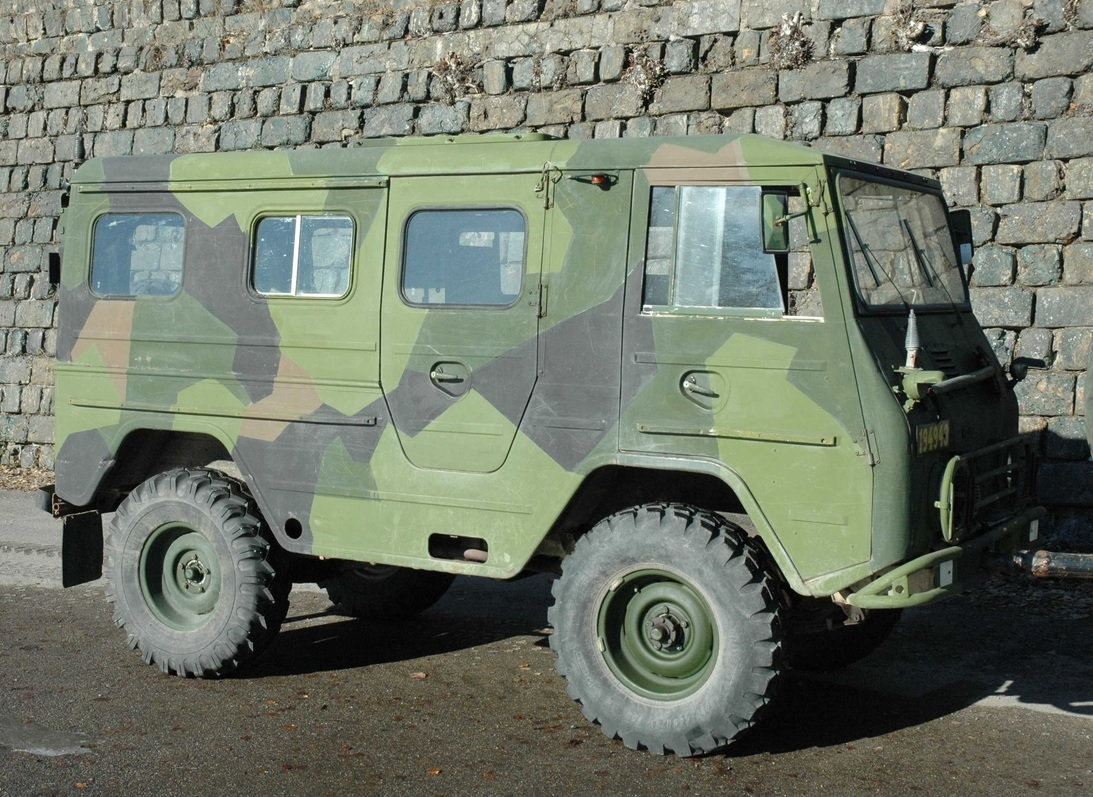
- Volvo L3315 Radiopersonterrängbil 9033

Overview
- Manufacturer: Volvo Cars
- Production: L3314: 1959–1967; C202: 1977–1981
- Assembly: L3314: Sweden (Lundby); C202 Laplander: Hungary (Csepel Automobile Factory Szigethalom)

Body and chassis
- Class: Military vehicle
- Body style: 5-door estate
- Layout: Mid-engine, four-wheel-drive
- Related: Volvo C303

Powertrain
- Engine: L2304: 1583 cc B16 I4; L3314: 1778 cc B18 I4; C202: 1986 cc B20A I4
- Transmission: L3314: 4-speed M42 manual; C202: 4-speed M45 manual

Dimensions
- Wheelbase: 2,100 mm (83 in)
- Length: 4,015 mm (158 in)
- Width: 1,680 mm (66 in)
- Height: 2,145 mm (84 in)
- Curb weight: Pickup: 1,600 kg (3,527 lb); Hardtop: 1,795 kg (3,957 lb)

Chronology
- Predecessor: TP21
- Successor: Volvo C303

The Volvo L3314 is a range of military vehicles produced by Volvo.

In the early 1950s Volvo received an order to develop a new utility vehicle for the Swedish Army. A pre-run series of 90 vehicles, named the L2304, was delivered between 1959 and 1961. It was powered by a Volvo B16 engine. Full scale deliveries of the somewhat improved L3314 began in 1963. The L3314 was powered by the 1.8L B18.

The L33-series was offered with different body-variants such as hard-top, half-cab, soft-top, or special versions mounting anti-tank weapons. All vehicles are forward control (where the cab is located over the front axle), except the open L3304. The base version was the L3314SU softtop. Other versions were the L3314HT hardtop with mechanical winch, the L3304 anti-tank gun vehicle and the L3315 communications version, with a shielded 24V system. The L3314 was succeeded by the Volvo C303 in the late 1970s.

An upgraded version of the L3314 was offered on the civilian market in 1977 as the C202 Laplander. It was a hard-top with the more powerful B20 engine instead of the B18, but with less robust axles and no differential brake. The C202 was manufactured exclusively in Hungary Csepel Car Factory as a cheaper alternative to the more expensive C303. Civilian versions of the L3314 series, as well as the C202, are often called the Volvo "LAPLANDER".

== Military use ==
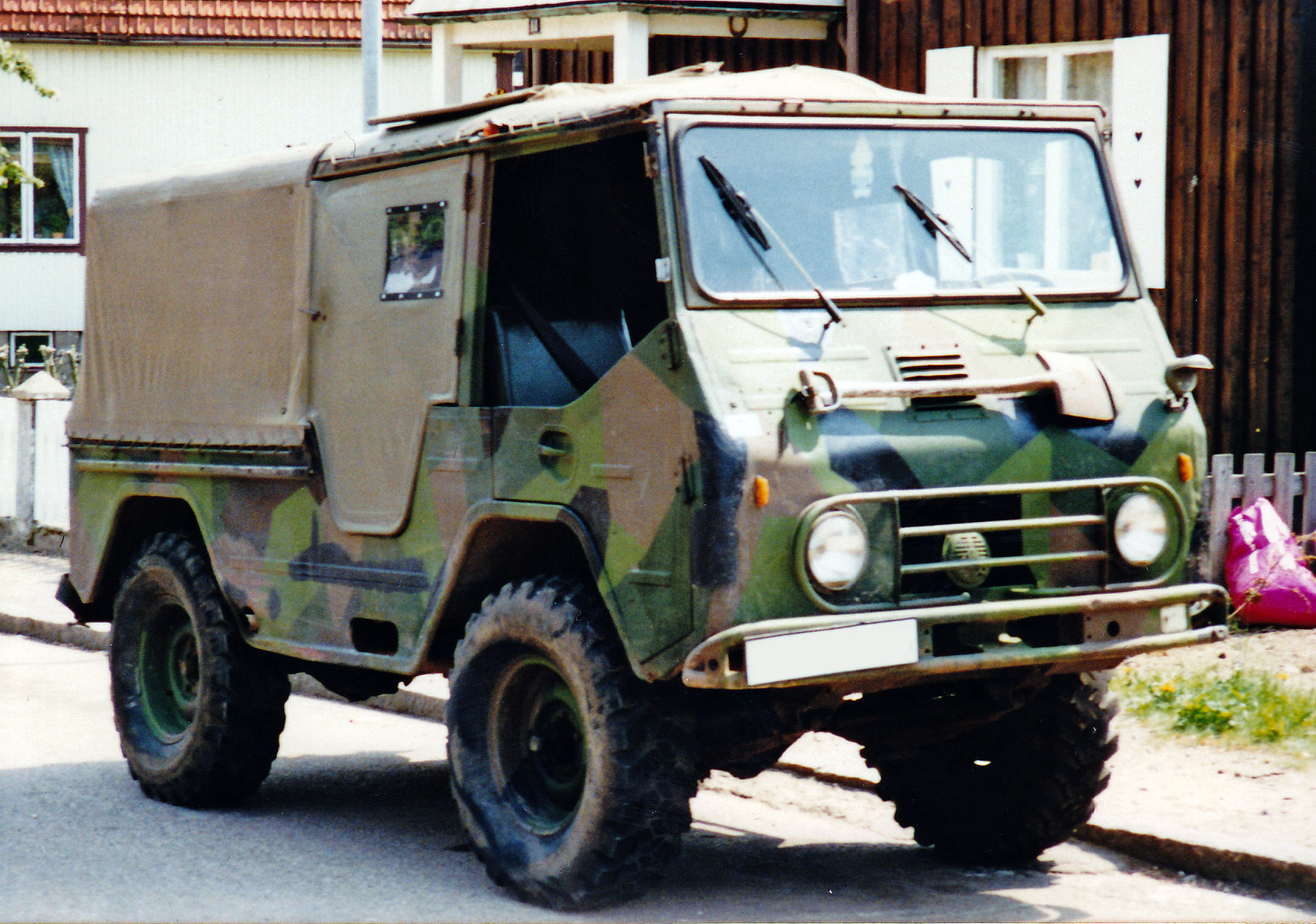
A 1963 Volvo L3314A (ex Swedish armed forces)

=== Sweden ===
The L3314SU was adopted by the Swedish Army in 1959 as the Personlastterrängbil 903 (Pltgb 903) and the L3314HT as the Pltgb 903B. The hard-top L3315 communications and command version was named the Radiopersonterrängbil 9033 (Raptgb 9033). (The L3315 was soon nicknamed Valp, meaning "puppy", from its clumsy looks.) The L3304 low profile open bodywork version was called the Pansarvärnspjästerrängbil 9031 (Pvpjtgb 9031) and armed with a Pvpj 1110 90 mm recoil-less antitank gun. The Swedish Army also used a few half-cabs, designated the Pansarvärnsrobotterrängbil 9032 (Pvrbtgb 9032) and fitted with a Bofors Bantam ATGM. There were some deliveries of a version for fire fighting, called the Brandterrängbil 921. These could be connected to a trailer via a power take-off at the rear of the vehicle.

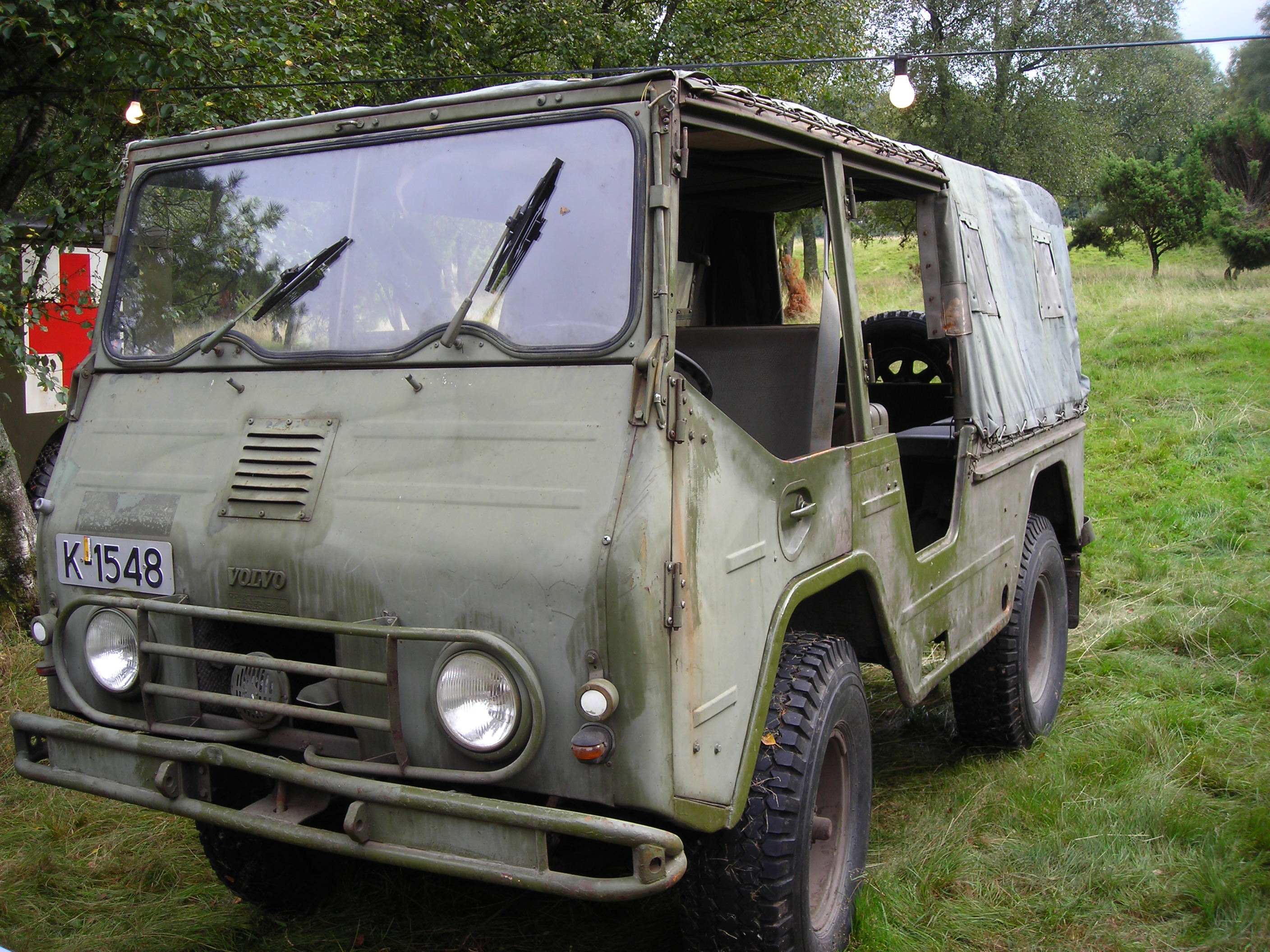
A 1968 Volvo L3314N, manufactured since 1962

=== Norway ===
The Norwegian Army adopted a version called the L3314N with a fold-down windscreen and 24 volt electrical system to comply with NATO regulations. About 2,000 vehicles were purchased and assembled at Raufoss in Norway. In Norway the L3314 is commonly known as "Felt", meaning "field", from its Norwegian military designation: Vogn, felt, 1/2 tonn, 4x4, Volvo, modell L3314N.

=== Netherlands ===
The Royal Netherlands Army bought a special version able to ford extra deep water (compared to the standard 0.5 metre limit).

=== Saudi Arabia ===
Saudi Arabia took delivery of some 200 L3314N Öken (Desert), which was an adapted version of the Norwegian version, the L3314N. A curious fact is that these desert-bound vehicles retained the Norwegian ski-racks.

== Civilian use ==
Both versions are employed by civilians for rescue services and private use. Many L3314s have been sold as military surplus and are used by off-road enthusiasts.

== Technology ==
The Laplander used constant velocity joints, of the type invented by Alfred H. Rzeppa, in its front axle.

== Data L3314 ==
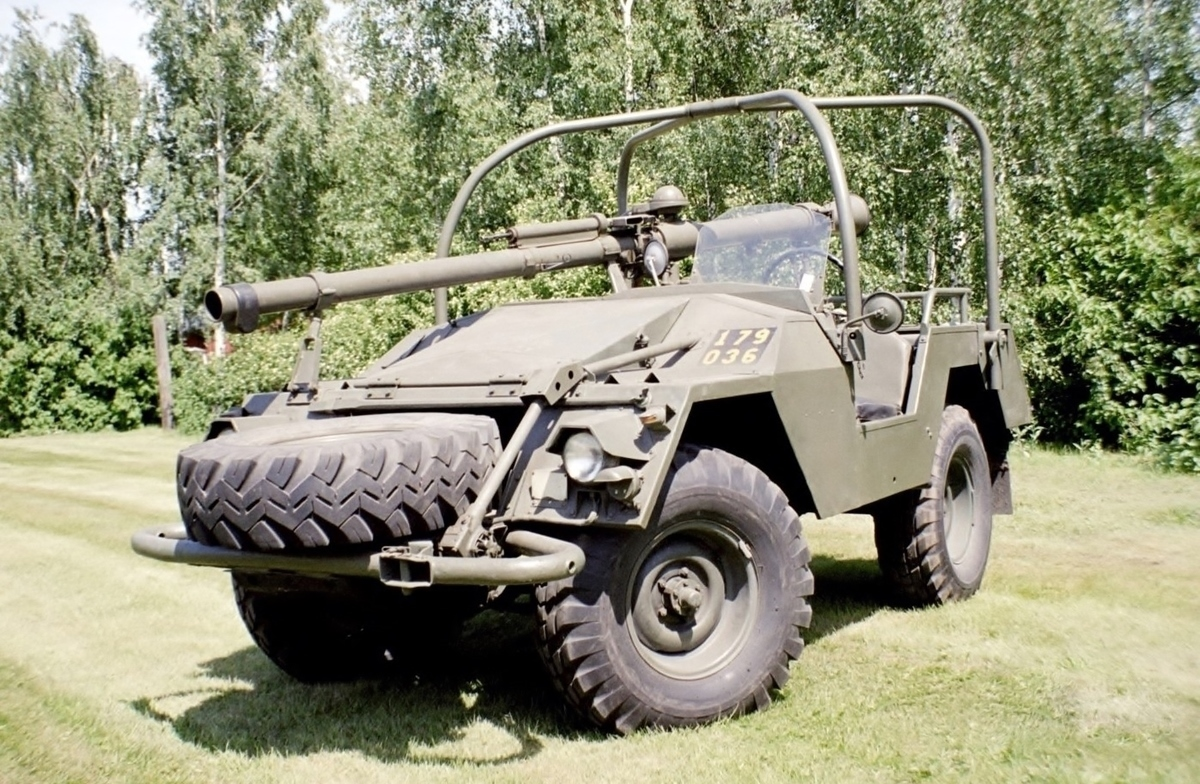
Pansarvärnspjästerrängbil 9031 (Pvpjtgb 9031) with Pansarvärnspjäs 1110 in place.

=== Engine ===
- Engine: B 18 A
- Fuel: leaded petrol
- Power: 65 hp (DIN) at 4500 rpm
- Volume: 1778 cc
- Compression ratio: 8,5:1

=== Transmission ===
- Gearbox: Modified Volvo M 40
- Transfer case: ZF VG 50
- Front axle: Salisbury 4HS-001-85
- Rear axle: Salisbury 4HA-00-92 with POWR-LOK differential brake

=== Wheel ===
- Rim: 6,50"×16"
- Tyre: 8,90"×16, modern designation 280/85R16"

== C 202 Laplander ==
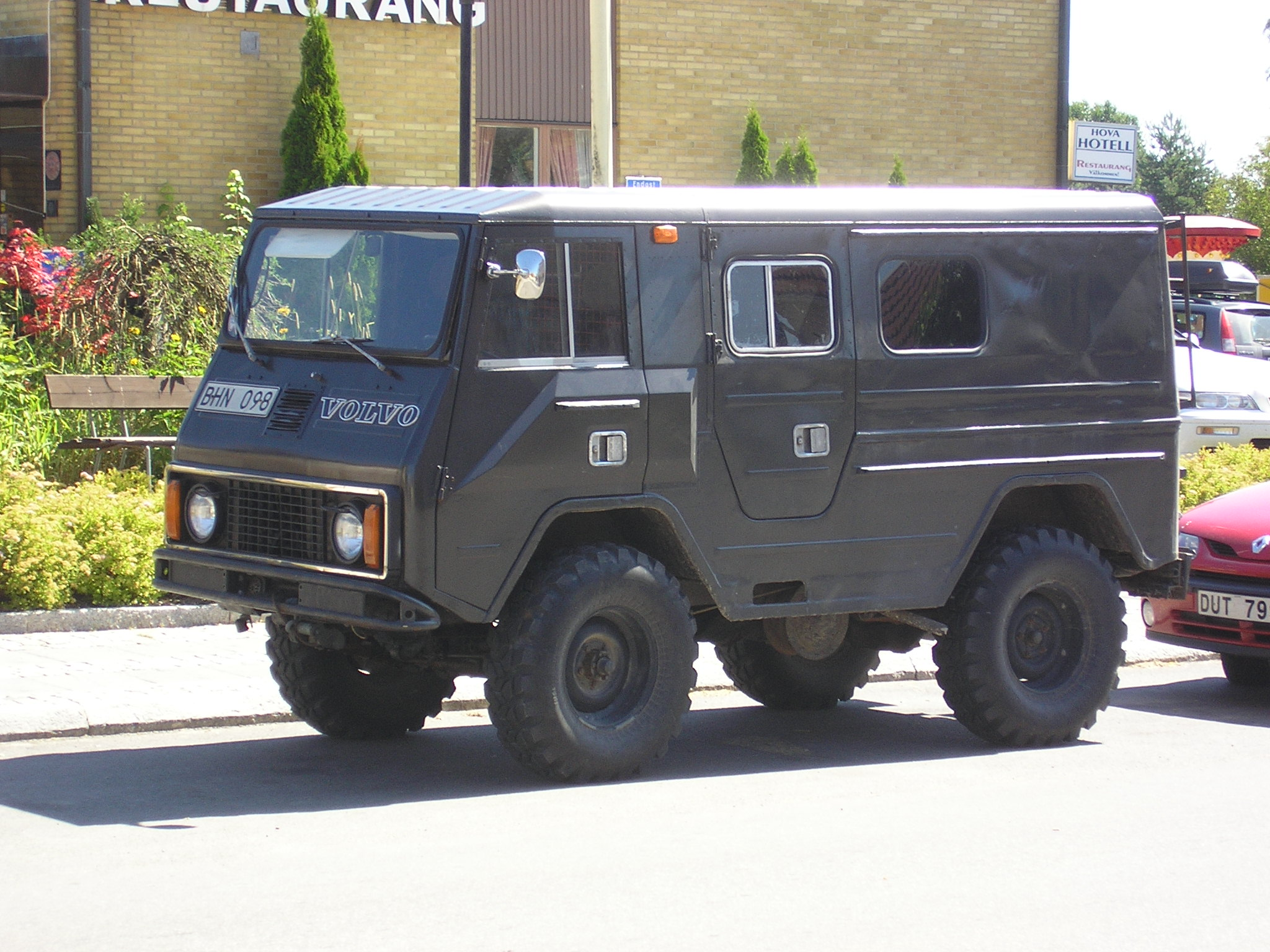
A 1977 Volvo C202 Laplander Hard Top

=== Engine ===
- Engine: B 20A
- Configuration: inline 4-cylinder
- Carburettor: 1 SU HIF-6
- Fuel: leaded petrol 93 octane
- Power: 82 hp
- Volume: 1978 cc
- Compression ratio: 8,7:1

=== Transmission ===
- Gearbox: Volvo M 45
- Transfer case: Volvo FD51 (part-time 4x4)
- Front axle: Salisbury 4HS-001-294 B
- Rear axle: Salisbury 4HA-001-293 B (sperr differential, without differential lock)

=== Other ===
- Tyre: 285/80 R16
- Top speed: 116 km/h (72 mph)
- Weight: Hard top 1,795 kg (3,957 lb), Pickup 1,600 kg (3,527 lb), Total (both)2,525 kg (5,567 lb)
- Dimensions: length 4,015 mm (158.1 in), width 1,680 mm (66.1 in), height 2,145 mm (84.4 in)

== Production ==
The L3314 and the L3315 were manufactured at Volvo's Lundby plant in Gothenburg.

- L3314: 7737
- L3315: 1116
- L3304: 367
- C202: 3322 (3324)
