= Csepel Automobile Factory =

Hungarian truck manufacturer

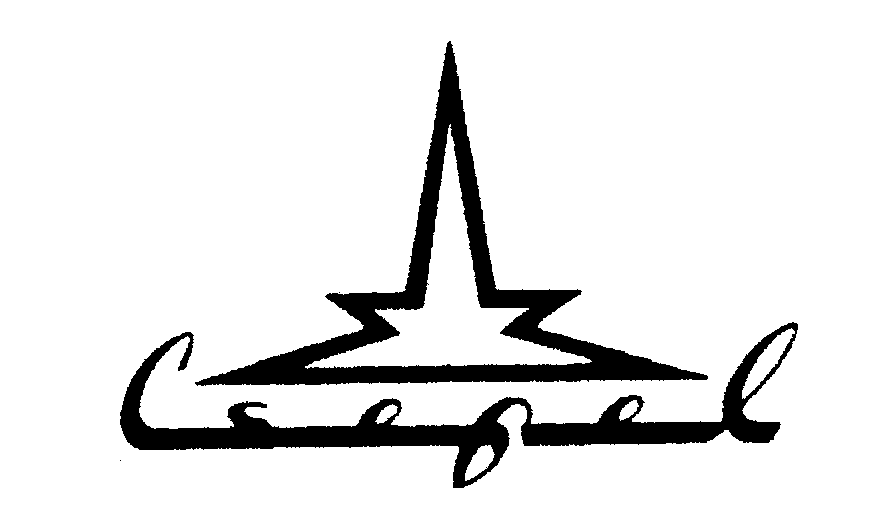
- Native name: Csepel Autógyár
- Industry: Vehicle industry
- Headquarters: Hungary, Szigetszentmiklós
- Products: Lorries and vehicle parts
- Production output: 1949–1996

Csepel (Hungarian pronunciation: [ˈt͡ʃɛpɛl]) was a Hungarian manufacturer of trucks for industrial use.

== History ==
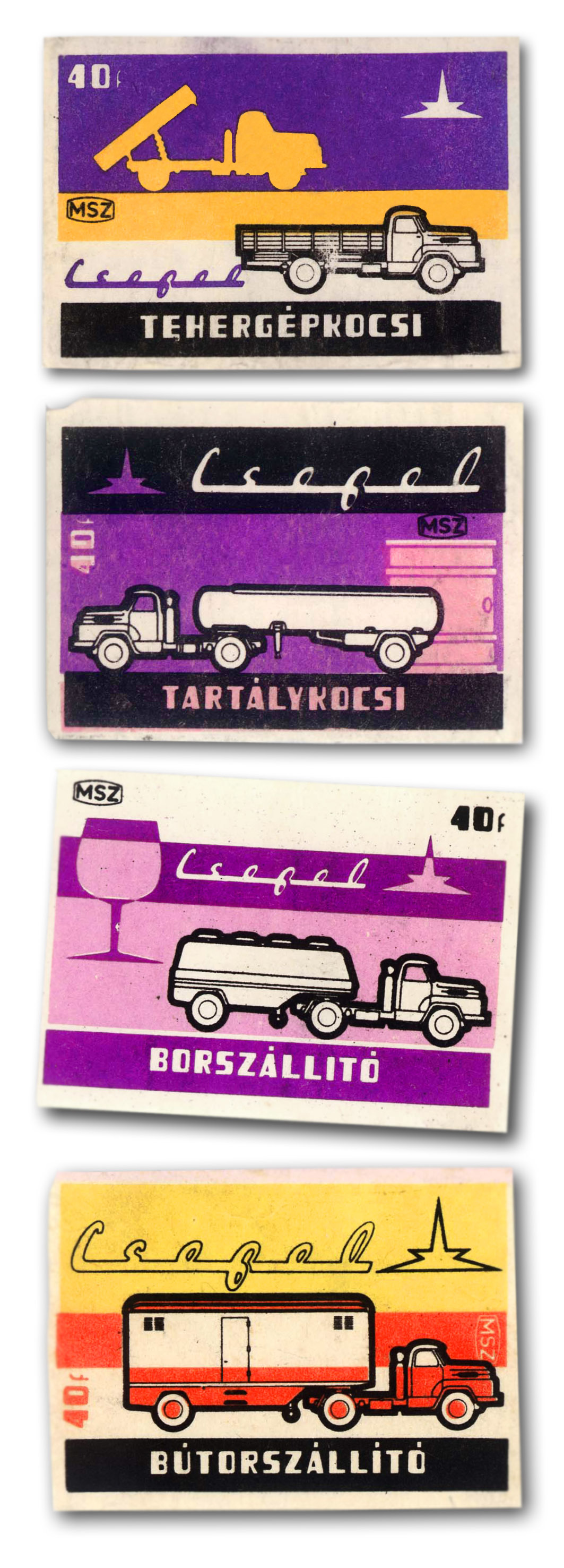
Different Csepel lorries on contemporary matchboxes, in the 1960s

In 1944 the Steyr 380 truck was designed in Austria, licensing Csepel lorries and engines. Production of the MÁVAG and the RÁBA lorries stopped after nationalization in 1946. In 1947 Hungary bought the licence for the Steyr 380 lorry, D413 and D613 engines from the USSR. At this time, the Soviets occupied the Eastern part of Austria.

In 1949 an automobile factory was established in the NIK (Nehéz Ipari Központ—en: Heavy Industry Center) at the earlier Dunai Repülőgépgyár—en: Danube Aircraft Factory place at Szigethalom. The first Csepel (NIK) engine was ready on 7 November.

The first director of the factory was Ferencné Bíró. She was a mechanical engineer and had studied in Moscow, sister-in-law of Mátyás Rákosi.

The first 3 Csepel D-350 were ready on 3 April 1950. The D-350 and B-350 types were produced between 1950 and 1958. The B-130 4x4 rover pickup lorry began production in 1949. The prototypes were made in Győr and Ikarus. It won a lorry race in Poland in 1950.

During 1968–1975 the evolution of Comecon (Council for Mutual Economic Assistance) changed the way Csepel operated. Csepel began shipping the undercarriage of the Ikarus to other factories for completion. Labor-MIM in Esztergom and later the Polish Jelcz & Star performed the final assembly.

In 1968 the Csepel started a new generation of RÁBA lorries incorporating the MAN engine (licensed).

In 1975 the Csepel stopped engine production entirely, instead using the RÁBA engine.

From 1976 to 1980 the factory built 1000 Volvo C202 Laplanders.

In 1996 Csepel went bankrupt because Ikarus had not paid for the transported undercarriages, having not been paid by its own customers.

In 2007 a D344 EZF lorry arrived with success on the Budapest-Bamako Rally in the touring category.

In 2009 a D420 fire-engine body built on a D344 undercarriage lorry arrived with success on the Budapest-Bamako Rally in the touring category.

Csepel trucks
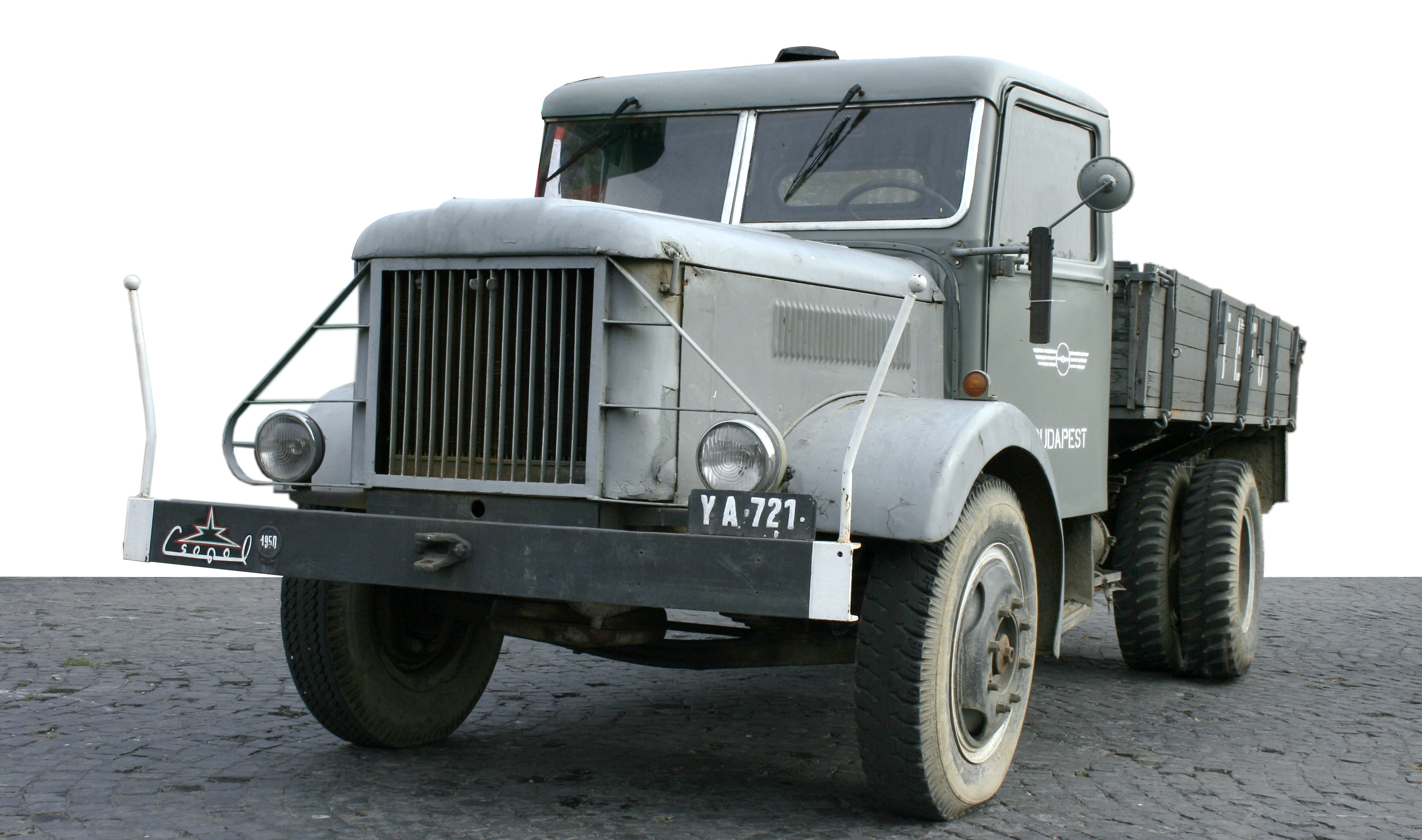
Made for TEFU (Teher Fuvarozási Vállalat – en: Freight Transport Company) Csepel D-350 in 1952.

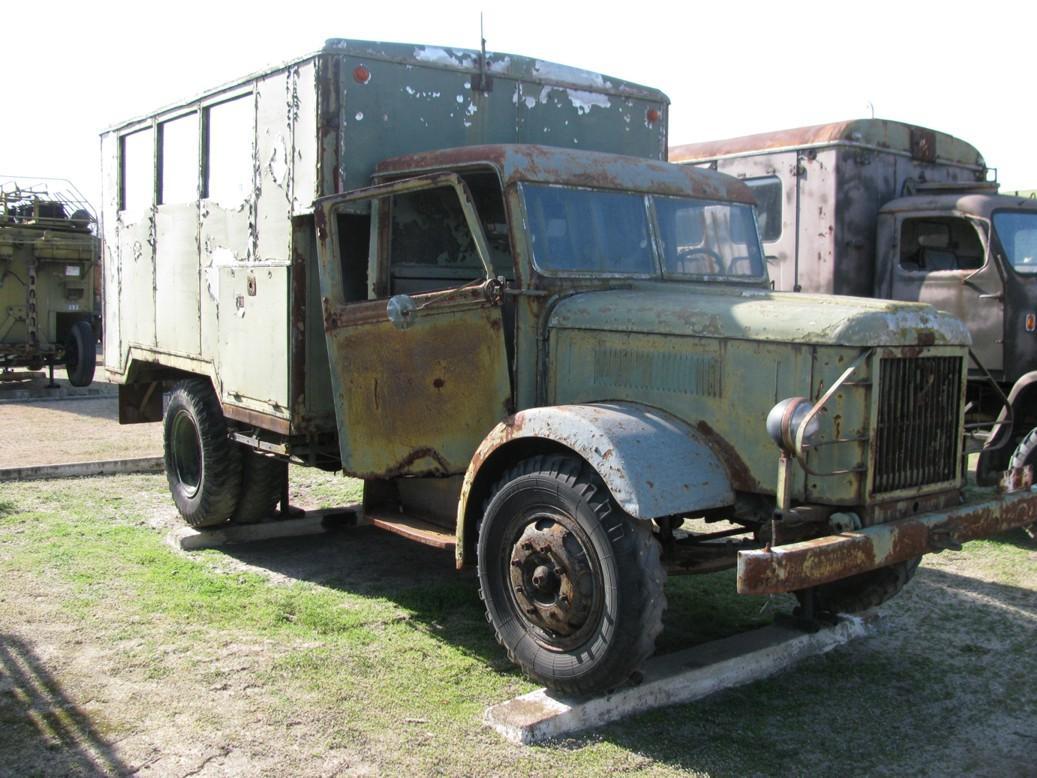
Csepel D-350 military lorry with special structure in Kecel, Military Park, Hungary (2012)

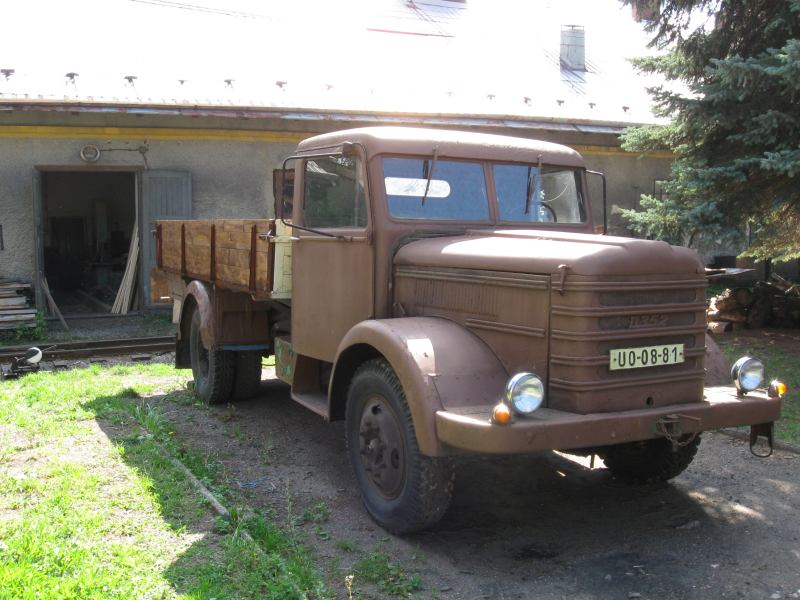
Today used Csepel D-352 in Czech Republic

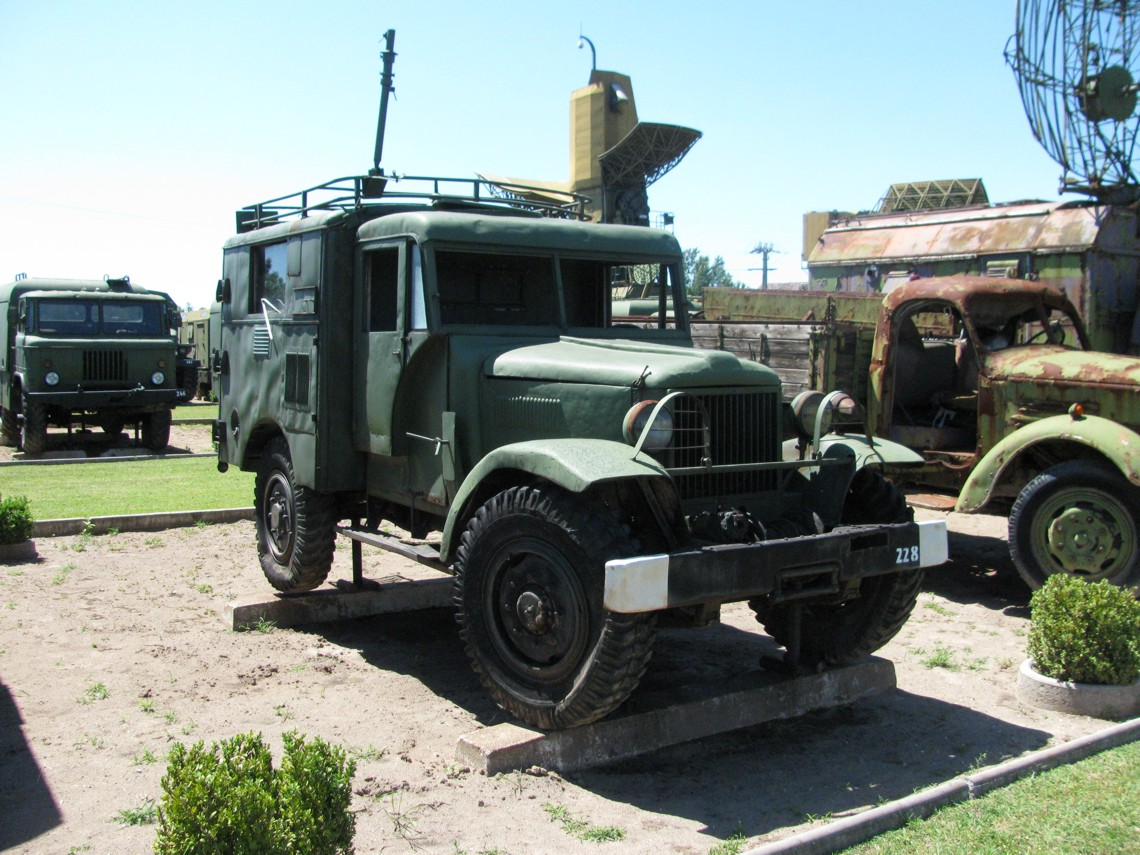
Csepel 130 signalman car in Kecel, Military Park, Hungary (2012)

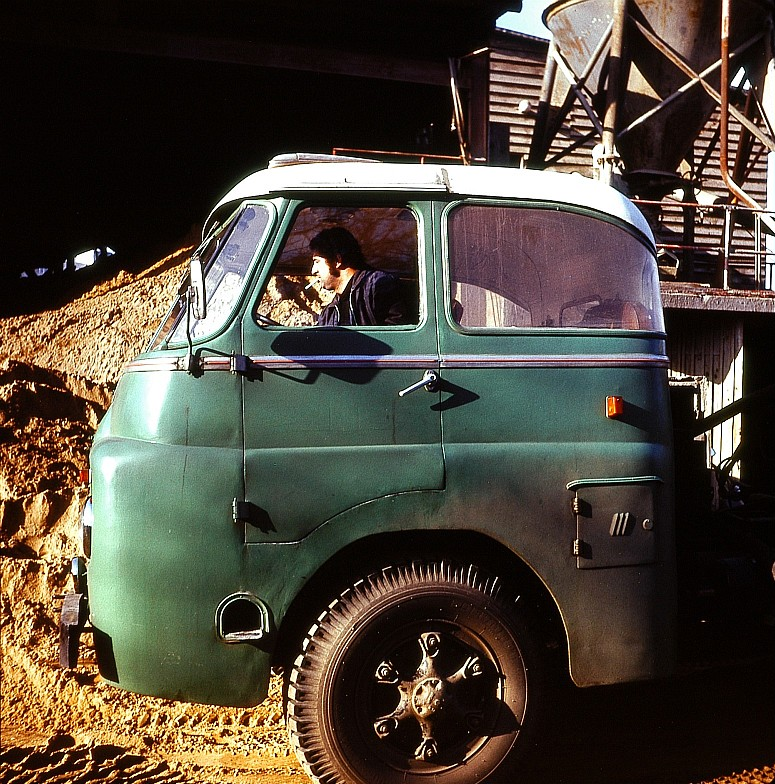
Csepel D-705 in 1972

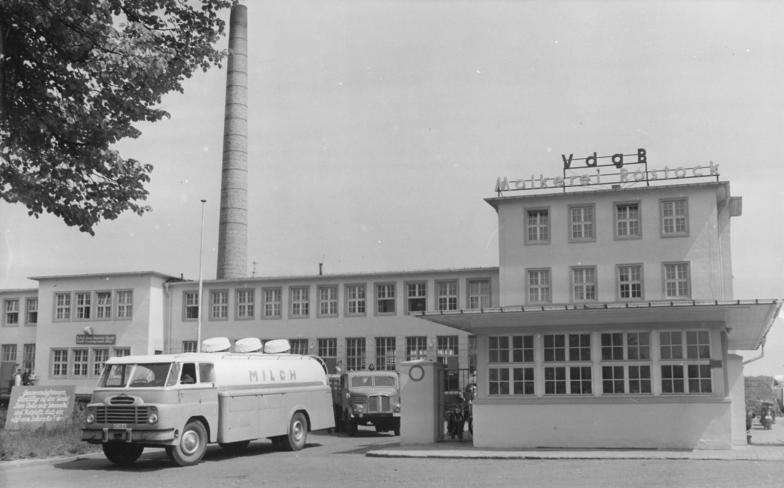
Csepel D-705 in Rostock, German Democratic Republic (1960)

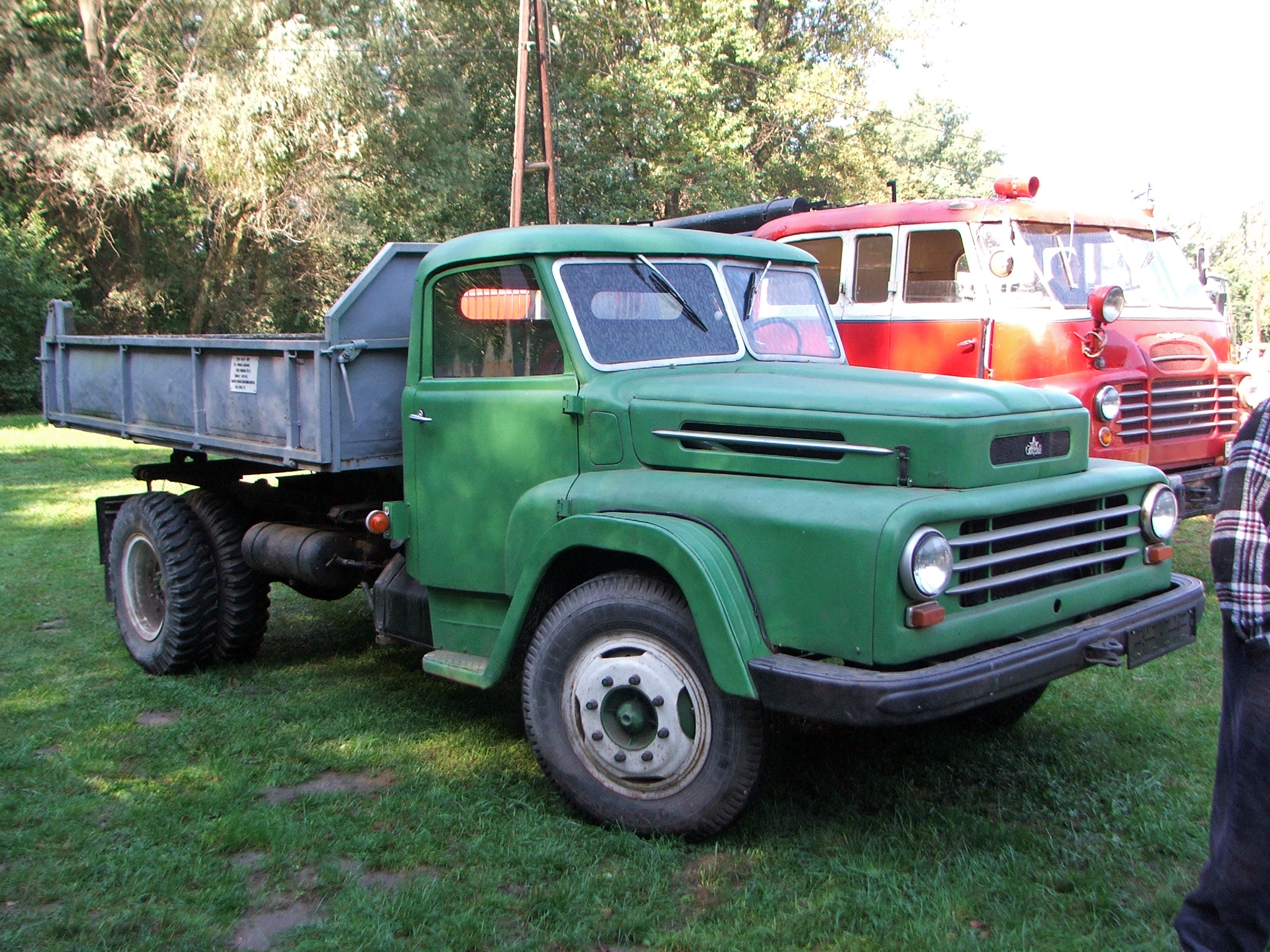
Redid Csepel 450 in Tata, September 2006.

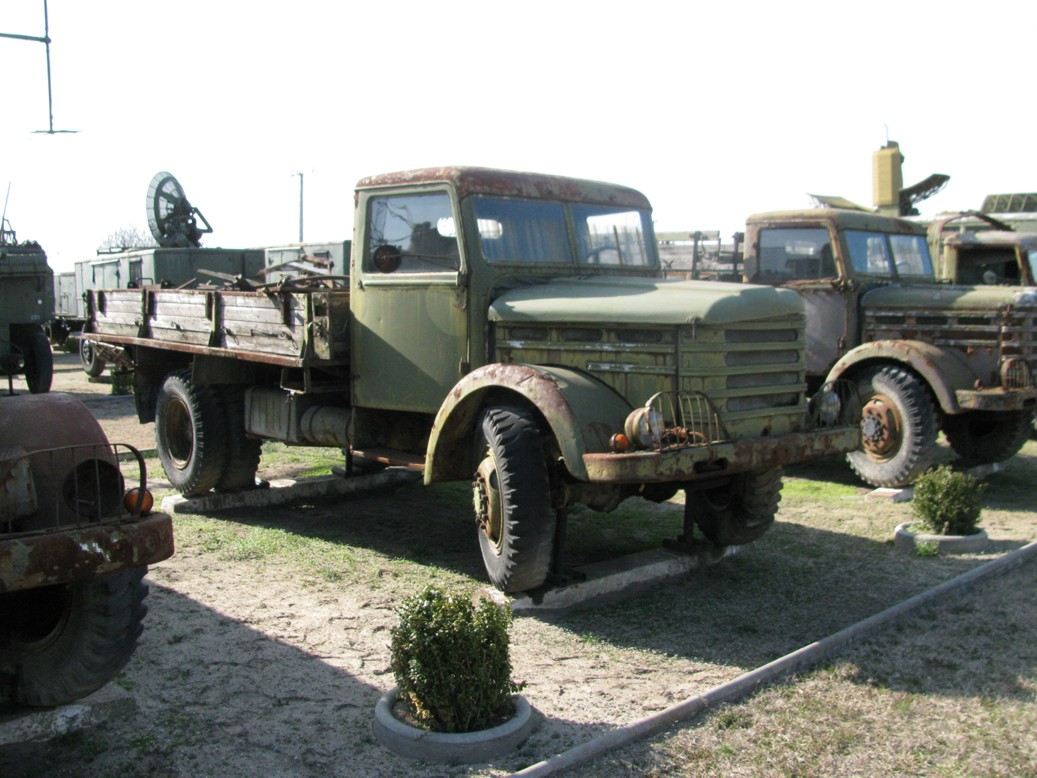
Csepel D-344 military lorry in Kecel, Military Park, Hungary (2012)

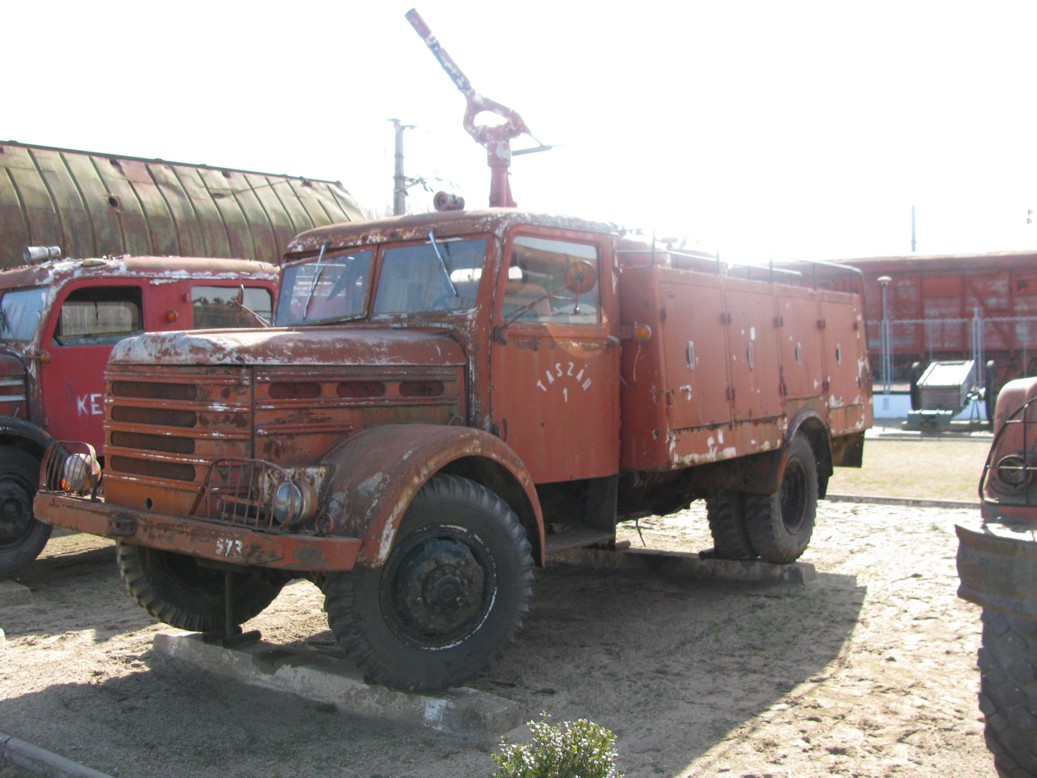
Csepel D-344 military airport fire P-1500 N2 "TASZÁR" in Kecel, Military Park, Hungary (2012)

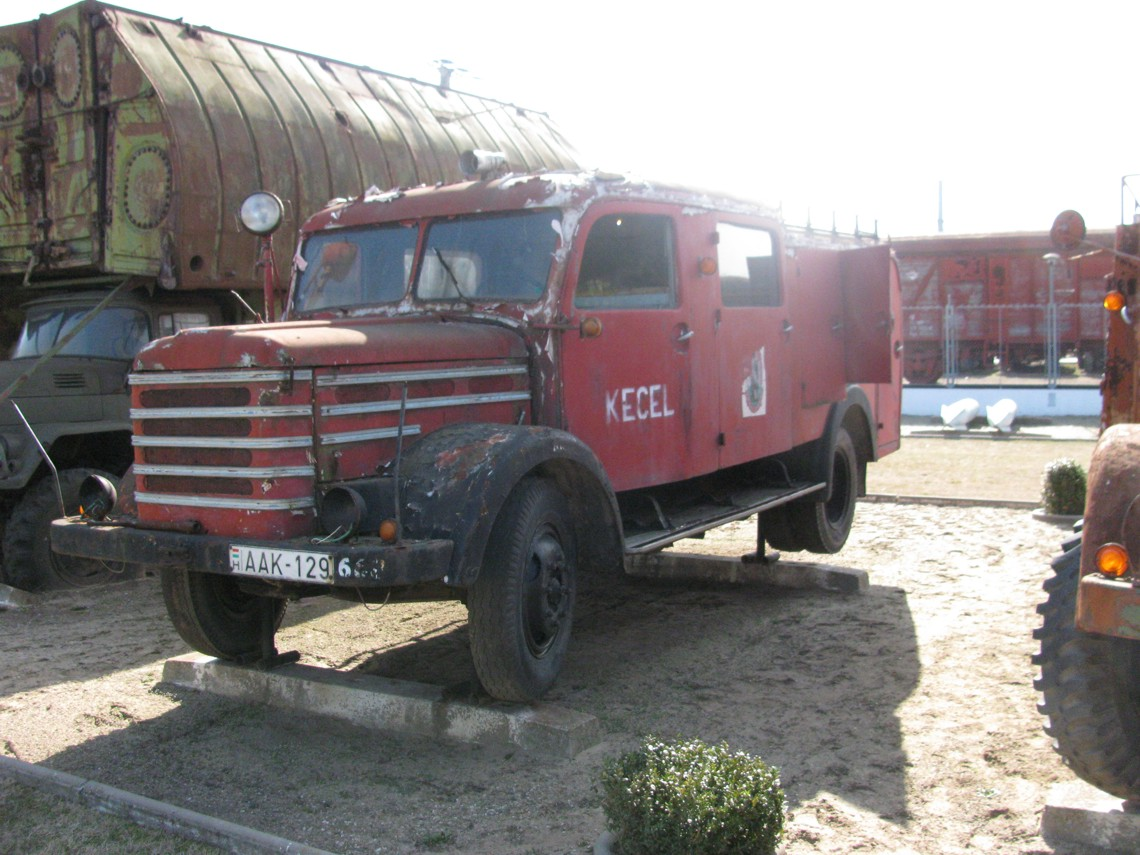
Csepel D-344 fire car from Kecel in Kecel, Military Park, Hungary (2012)

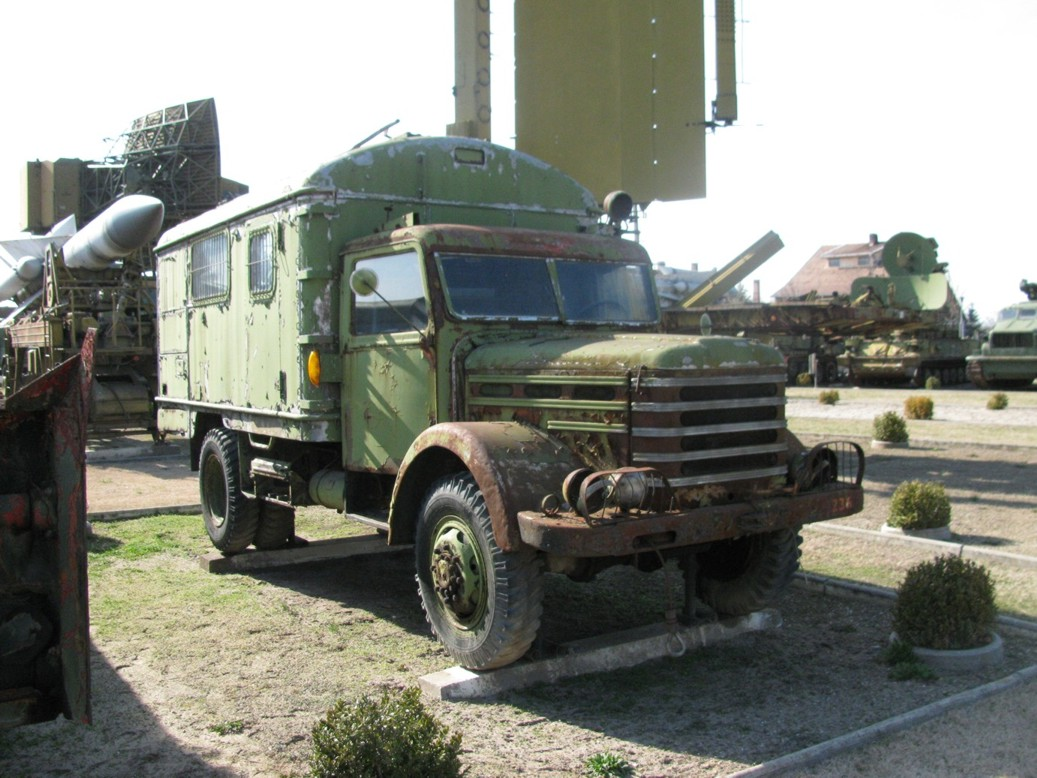
Csepel D-344 military lorry with EZF superstructure in Kecel, Military Park, Hungary (2012)

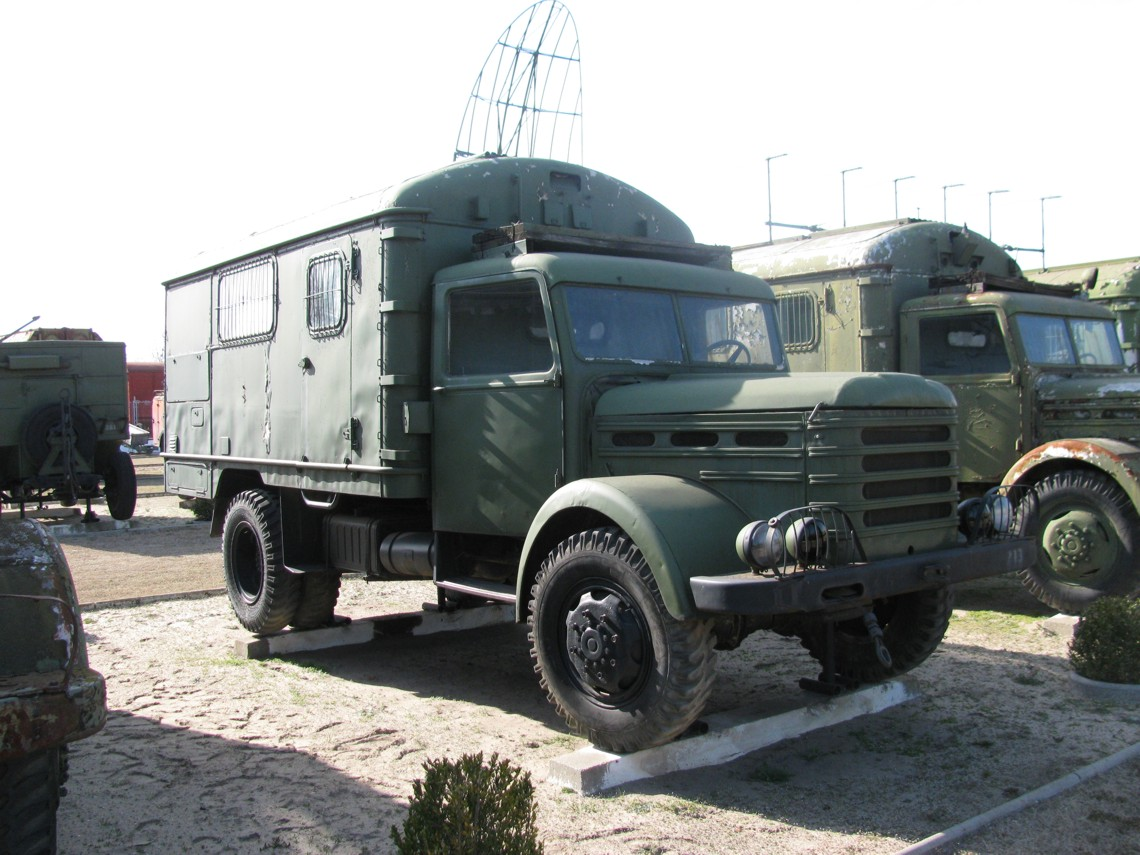
Csepel D-346 with EZF workshop superstructure in Kecel, Military Park, Hungary (2012)

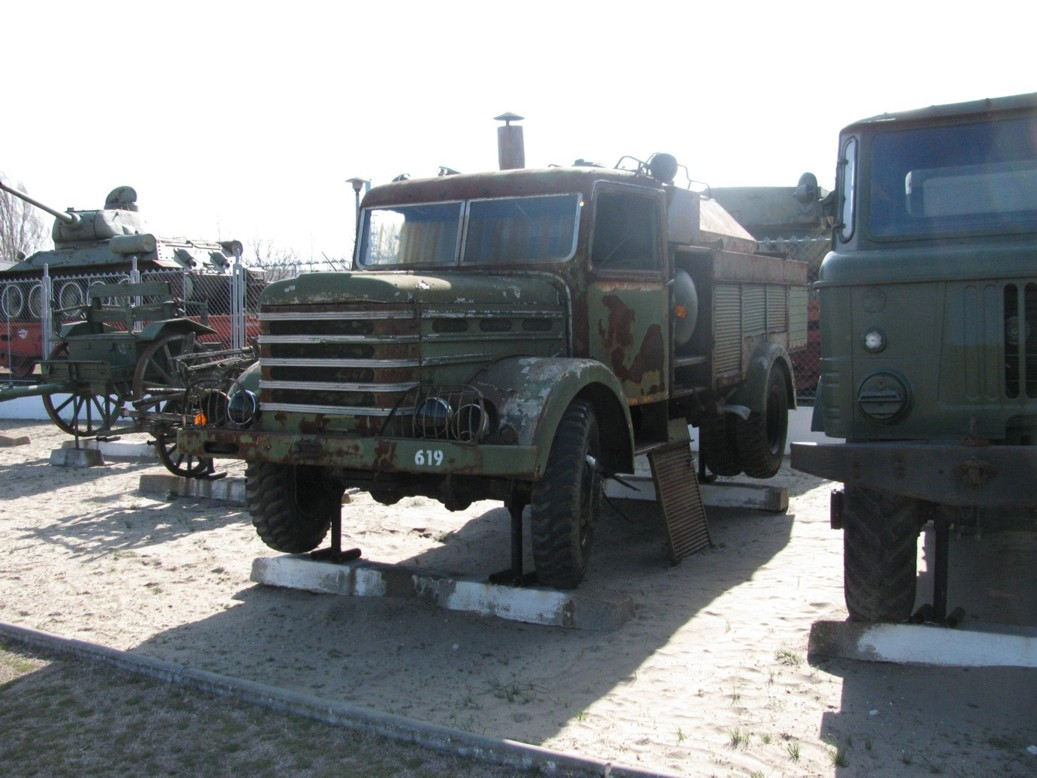
FMG-67 chemical protection military lorry on Csepel D-346 chassis in Kecel, Military Park, Hungary (2012)

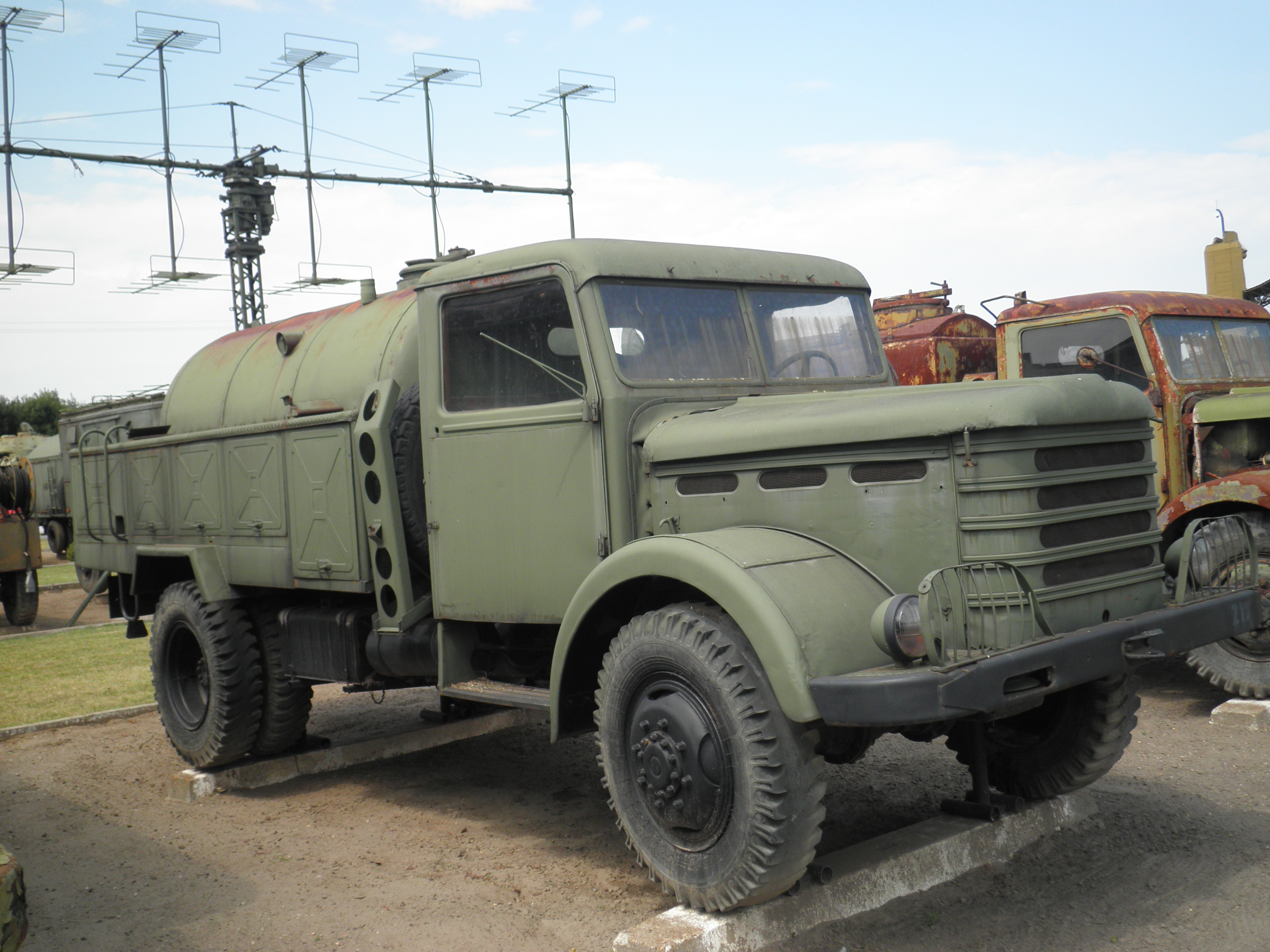
Csepel D-346 water delivery lorry in Kecel, Military Park, Hungary (2011)

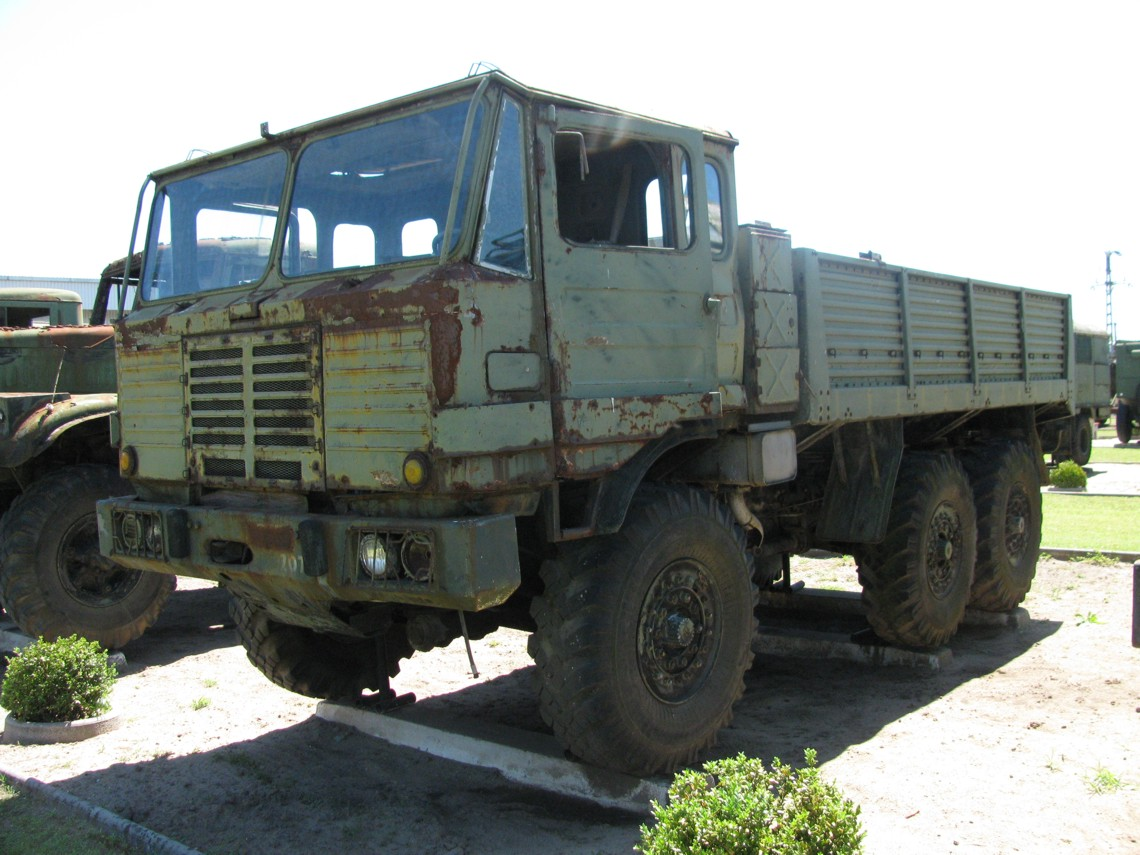
Csepel D-566 Land Rover lorry in Kecel, Military Park, Hungary (2012)

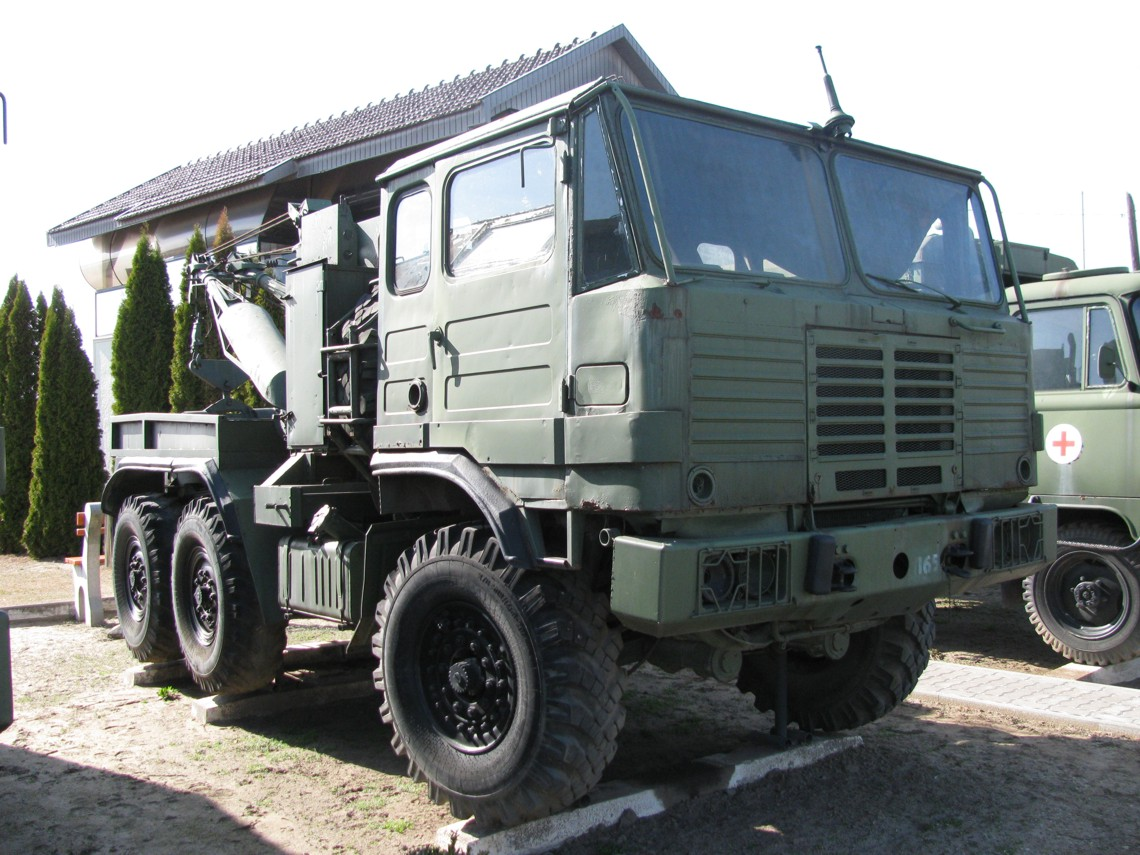
Csepel D-566 crane car in Kecel, Military Park, Hungary (2012)

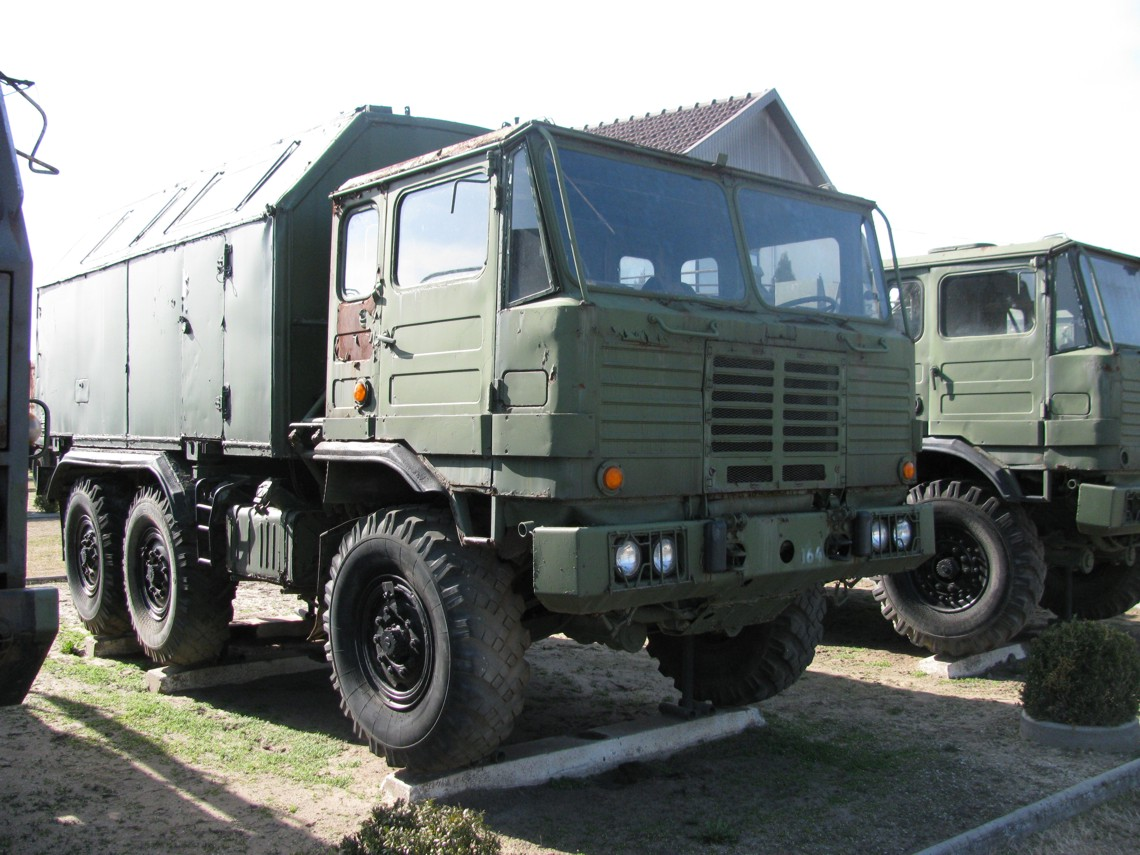
Csepel D-566 tank maintenance workshop car in Kecel, Military Park, Hungary (2012)
