= Csepel D-344 =

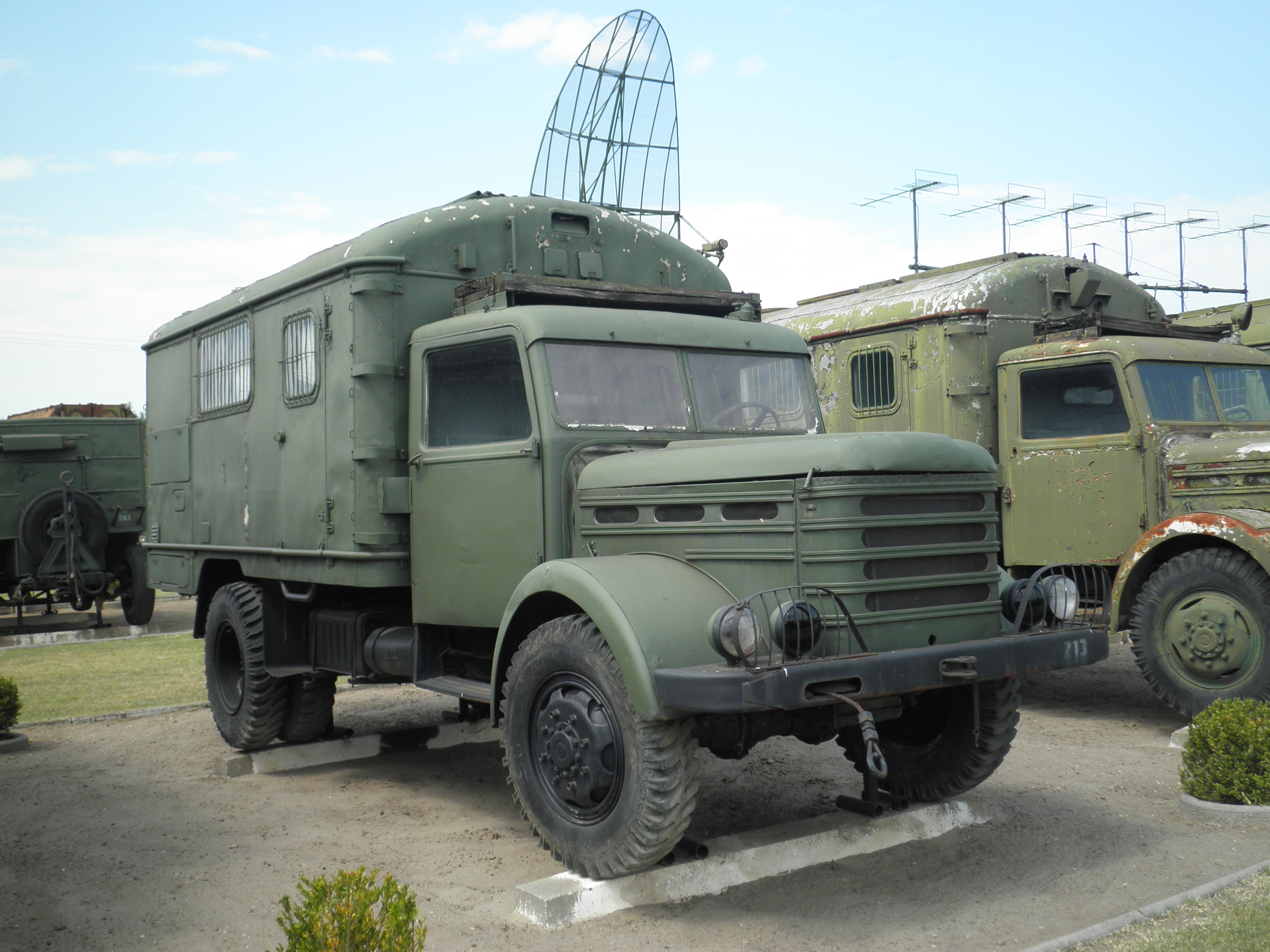
- Csepel D-344

Overview
- Type: Lorry
- Manufacturer: Csepel Autógyár
- Production: 1961–1975
- Assembly: Hungary: Budapest

Body and chassis
- Class: 3 t lorry
- Body style: Long-bonnet lorry
- Layout: Front engine, all-wheel-drive
- Platform: Csepel D-344
- Related: Csepel D-346

Powertrain
- Engine: Csepel D-414H (Diesel, 5.5 dm^{3}, 70 kW)
- Transmission: Manual five-speed gearbox
- Propulsion: Tyres

Dimensions
- Wheelbase: 3750 mm
- Length: 6716 mm
- Width: 2498 mm
- Height: 2775 mm
- Kerb weight: 5700 kg

Chronology
- Predecessor: None
- Successor: None

The Csepel D-344 is a medium size, 3-tonne, 4×4 off-road lorry, made by Hungarian manufacturer Csepel Autógyár, from 1961 to 1975. It was first presented to the public on the Leipzig Trade Fair in early 1963. The Hungarian People's Army purchased huge quantities of the D-344, and eventually used it as their standard lorry. It proved to be robust and reliable.

== Description ==
The Csepel D-344 uses a welded ladder frame, and has two permanently driven, leaf-sprung live axles. The front axle has single wheels, whereas the rear axle has twin wheels. All wheels are of the size 9.00–20.00 in. In its standard configuration, the D-344 has a ground clearance of 270 mm and a fording depth of 800 mm. The D-344 has a pneumatic braking system with drum brakes on all wheels. The ramp angle is 35° on the front axle, and 25° on the rear axle; the maximum gradeability is 44%.

The Csepel D-344 is powered by a Csepel D-414H naturally aspirated, 5.5-litre, precombustion chamber injected, straight four-cylinder diesel engine. It produces a maximum torque of 33 kp⋅m (324 N⋅m) at 1500/min, and has a rated power output of 95 PS (70 kW) at 2300/min. Its minimum fuel consumption is rated 190 g/PSh (258 g/kWh) at 2000/min. (All figures according to DIN 70020).

The torque is transmitted from the engine to the manual five-speed gearbox with a single-disc dry clutch. The transfer gearbox that sends torque to both the front and rear axles also includes the differential for the front axle. Therefore, the D-344 has two drive shafts that send the torque from the transfer gearbox to the front axle, one for each wheel. This design was chosen to allow for a lower engine mounting point and thus a lower centre of gravity. The transfer gearbox has a differential lock in order to increase the D-344's off-road capabilities.

With its mass of 5700 kg (DIN 70030; includes 215 litres of fuel and a 75 kg driver), the Csepel D-344 can reach a top speed of 82 km/h. The fuel consumption is rated 28.7 L/100 km. The standard payload is 3000 kg; in addition to that, the D-344 can pull trailers with a mass of up to 2000 kg. Military versions of the D-344 were equipped with a front winch.

== Types ==
The Csepel D-344 was built in several different types:

- D-344.00: Standard military flatbed variant, built from 1961 to 1966
- D-344.01: Like the D-344.00, but without opening side panels
- D-344.02: Civilian variant, no winch, but greater payload
- D-344.05: D-344-based fire engine
- D-344.22: Tropical type with better engine cooling, double-roof, and balloon tyres
