= Audiovisualogy =

Study of audiovisual media

Audiovisualogy is the study of audiovisual media, including cinema, television or other visual art forms. The etymological meaning of the word "audiovisualogy" is linked, on the one hand, with audiovisual, the means jointly related to the view and the hearing and, on the other hand, to the suffix logy (after logos), which in Greek means treaty, knowledge.

It is also feasible to understand it as the means and art that combine fixed projected images (slides or digital support) in its montage, accompanied by sounds of a different nature, therefore meaning a language different from the film, since it does not use the image in motion.

Although it was known in France as diaporama (slideshow) in 1950, its current name of audiovisual art is truly accepted in many fields, such as in some institutions in the United Kingdom, like photo clubs and others with a high artistic level, as the Royal Photography Society, among others.

From this perspective, it is also possible to develop a theory about the audiovisual art, thus defining it as the language that combines still images (pictures with sound), in a montage that by its condition is displayed as in the cinema, in a room designed for that purpose.

== Historical background ==
The audiovisual art constitutes a means of expression which came before the cinema. In fact, projections of still images are really old. In 1660, Athanasius Kircher invented one of the first magic lanterns that worked as a real projector, which had a great diffusion afterwards.

Moreover, from another point of view, the prehistoric man could be considered as the first audiovisual spectator of humanity, who contemplated the static skies and the landscape in amazement, along with the sounds of nature coming from the animals and the storms. The cave paintings inside the caves ended up representing the first screen of the humanity in the dark inside of a venue.

Much later, Louis Daguerre and Charles Marie Bouton were the first creators of the panoramas, i.e., large lounges with painted curtains, on which the light was projected in a zenith shape to give the illusion of reality. In 1822, the diorama, built by both of them, became the ultimate expression of the current audiovisual art, since it modified the panorama by the layout of several overlapped curtains with themes of nature, which produced a changing effect when moving from one image to another by the dissolve effect, all this accompanied by sounds with a principle of action, development and final parts.

== The audiovisual concept as an art ==
One of the main foundations that defines this means as an art is its connection to painting. If the conditions are given like that, and the accompanying sound represents an expression which is also aesthetic, the attitude of contemplation separates the audiovisual concept from the physical world of the movement in the cinema and other means.

The attitude of contemplation of the fine arts necessarily implies a spiritualization of the emotions, where the classic spirit prevails.

Jean Leirens had already expressed that there are two ways to represent time. One is by representing it as it is, and the other one means exceeding it. He stated that the second way belongs precisely to the poetic creation.

Eugenio Montes, when writing its Elementos of Filmología [Film-making Elements], announced that the calling of the classic period consisted of the stillness, since only things that are quiet consisted of something. On the contrary, when they moved, they already seemed inconsistent to the classic period. Because of this, the ancient spirit culminates in the sculptural attitude of the best gesture, set under a kind of eternity. That is what makes the difference with the cinema, which culminates its expression in the art of movement.

Another reason that justifies the audiovisual concept as an art is the use of the music that, represented accordingly with the still images, creates a new aesthetic expression by setting a different path, perhaps fairly unexplored, further accentuating the attitude of contemplation.

== The audiovisual montage ==
Considering these principles, the audiovisual montage may refer to two aspects: the intrinsic one, which alludes to the aesthetic connection of a shot with the next one, thus obtaining different forms, such as the analogy, the contrast and others. The other aspect is the extrinsic montage, which is the method of association point between a shot and the next one and that may be, for example, by a cut or by the so-called dissolve effect or lap dissolve between a still image and the one after it.

Like in the cinema, the intrinsic montage methods are very varied and represent a substantial element in the analysis of the construction of the audiovisual language.

== Differences with the cinema ==
=== Analysis of the movement in the audiovisual art and the cinema ===
While the audiovisual art is always connected with a past of unfathomable character, the cinema can never be separated from the present time, because it depicts its physical representation. The few films that tend to an evocation of the still image do it only sometimes, to then return to what is their natural environment.

In the audiovisual art, the only movement expressed is the extrinsic montage of change from one shot to the next one, and while in the cinema this also happens, the internal movement of objects and characters of each one of the corresponding shots is added to its intrinsic montage, a movement that does not occur in the audiovisual art.

While the development of the aesthetic of the movement has for the cinema its purpose as an artistic means of expression, in the audiovisual art the method is a different one, more related to the contemplation.

== See also ==
- Film studies

== Sources ==
- Arnheim, Rudolf. Film as Art. Buenos Aires. Editorial Paidós. Buenos Aires. 1986.
- Jorge Luis Farjat. Audiovisual Theory Teoría Audiovisual. Colección de Arte y Memoria Audiovisual. Buenos Aires. 2004. ISBN 987-43-6843-8
- Jorge Luis Farjat. Audiovisualogy. The Audiovisual as Art and Mean of Communication. Audiovisualogía. El audiovisual como arte y medio de comunicación. Colección de arte y memoria audiovisual. Buenos Aires. 1979. ISBN 950-43-3879-8
- Jorge Luis Farjat.The audiovisual art: photographs projected together with sound. El arte audiovisual. Fotografías proyectadas unidas al sonido. Colección de arte y memoria audiovisual. Buenos Aires. 2015. ISBN 978-987-33-8442-4
- Millingham, F. Porque nació el cine. Buenos Aires. Editorial Nova. 1945
- Rafaél C. Sánchez. Montaje cinematográfico. Arte en movimiento. Editorial La Crujía. Buenos Aires. 2003. ISBN 987-1004-38-9
