= Lightware =

Hungarian audiovisual equipment company

Lightware Visual Engineering
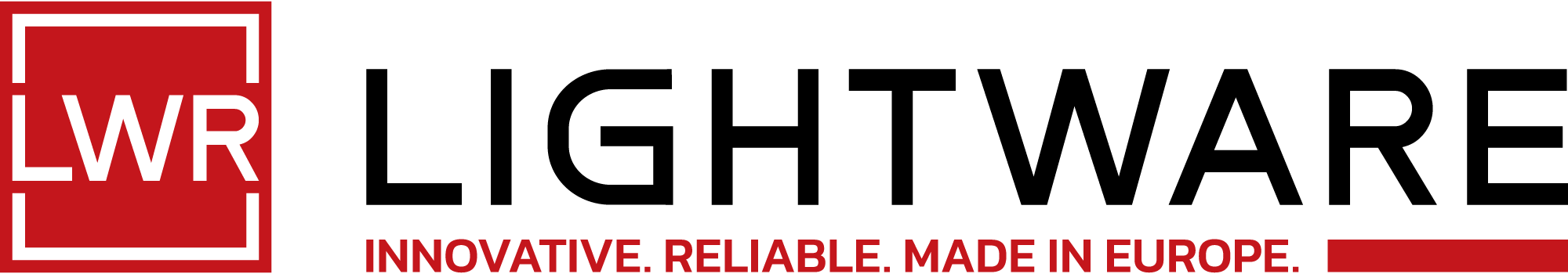
- Company type: Private
- Industry: Audiovisual
- Founded: 1998
- Founder: Árpád Gergely Vida, Miklós Debreczeni, Attila Nagy, György Németh
- Headquarters: Budapest, Hungary
- Area served: Worldwide
- Key people: Árpád Gergely Vida & Loránd Gál (CEOs & managing directors)
- Products: Pro AV, Hybrid working solutions, Live event AV solutions, commercial audiovisual
- Owner: Árpád Gergely Vida
- Number of employees: 415 (2023)
- Website: lightware.com

Lightware Visual Engineering (or simply Lightware, Hungarian: Lightware Vetítéstechnikai Zrt.) is a Hungarian privately owned company, manufacturer and distributor of audiovisual automation and integration equipment based in Budapest, Hungary, founded in 1998. Lightware is Europe's largest manufacturer of AV management products in both fixed installation market areas (e.g. in theaters, in the entertainment industry, for medical applications, in the education sector, in smart homes as well as for all types of corporate applications such as collaboration and conferencing) and in the extensive segment of live events. Since its founding numerous projects have been planned and carried out in many countries around the world. The company develops and produces all products at the headquarters in Budapest, Hungary. The company is privately owned by the founder Árpád Gergely Vida. To this day he is CEO and head of the development department.

== History ==
Lightware was founded by Árpád Gergely Vida, Miklós Debreczeni, Attila Nagy and György Németh in 1998. In its early years, two employees worked for the company, and they repaired only projectors and plasma TVs.

In 2006 the engineers of Lightware invented the EDID Manager as the very first product, helping the users to handle the different predefined video signal resolutions. After this, the company appeared at the ISE exhibition in Brussels, Belgium. A year later, the first hybrid eight-input and eight-output fully digital video-multiplexer matrix supporting HD resolution, the 32x32 DVI and HDMI Matrix Switcher was completed. This device eliminated the need for multiple devices by combining DVI and HDMI connectivity ports on a large crosspoint size.

In 2011 Lightware opened its first two offices outside Hungary, in the United Kingdom and in the United States of America, two years later followed by the ones in Australia, Italy and Singapore, and in 2015 in the Netherlands, India and in the Middle East.

It was 2020, when Lightware announced the arrival of the Taurus UCX, using USB-C technology to send video, audio, control and Ethernet signals through a single cable for enhanced collaborations.

== Activity ==
Lightware focuses on audiovisual technology, develops and manufactures data transmission devices. The products of the company are used in rental events, such as concerts and shows.

Lightware is Europe's biggest AV manufacturer company. The product range includes AV-over-IP products, presentation switchers, HDMI switchers and extenders. The Taurus UCX range offers the latest technology for boardrooms incorporating USB-C, HID USB, room control and video distribution and switching with Cisco certified class leading technology.

High-tech meeting room systems that support hybrid work are also operated with the company's devices, for example at Google, Microsoft, Apple, Netflix or Facebook, where the entire control and automation of the meeting rooms, the power, turning on and off of the lighting can be solved from a single touch screen. In addition, Lightware's products can be found in 3D simulation rooms of car factories, in the controls of oil platforms, in the control centers of well-known buildings, as well as on airplanes, yachts and submarines.

The company develops and manufactures all its products at its headquarters in Budapest. Since the company has offices and distribution points worldwide, more than 99% of sales revenue comes from export.

== Product lines ==
- Taurus UCX/TPX/TPN
- UBEX (Ultra Bandwidth Extender)
- VINX (Video Network Extender)
- Gemini GVN
- TPS extenders
- HDMI-TPX extenders
- HDMI-TPN extenders
- MX2 series
- MX2M series
- MX series
- MMX series
- MMX2 series
- OPTC/OPTJ extenders
- HDMI/USB/USB-C cables
- Event Manager
- LARA (Lightware Advanced Room Automation)
- Monitoring Webtool
- Lightware software

== Sales network ==
The company has opened offices on four continents so far. In the countries, where Lightware hasn't established an office yet, they allot the products thanks to the distribution network, or serve the customers by the HQ from Budapest, Hungary.

Lightware offices:

Lightware partner	Office	Showcase countries
Lightware Australia Pty Ltd.	(Australia) Brisbane, Sydney	Australia, New Zealand
Lightware Deutschland GmbH	(Germany) Hamburg, München	Germany
Lightware Inc.	(United States) Lake Orion, Las Vegas, New York City, San Francisco, (Canada) Toronto	United States, Canada
Lightware Schweiz GmbH	(Switzerland) Volketswil	Switzerland, Liechtenstein
Lightware Visual Engineering Benelux	(Netherlands) Hilversum	Belgium, Netherlands, Luxembourg
Lightware Visual Engineering CEU	(Poland) Warsaw	Bulgaria, Czech Republic, Latvia, Lithuania, Poland, Romania, Slovakia
Lightware Visual Engineering France	(France) Paris	France
Lightware Visual Engineering Greater China	Hong Kong	Hong Kong, Macau, People's Republic of China, Republic of China
Lightware Visual Engineering HQ	(Hungary) Budapest	Rest of the World
Lightware Visual Engineering Iberia	(Spain) Barcelona	Portugal, Spain
Lightware Visual Engineering India	(India) Ahmedabad, Bangalore, Kolkata, Delhi, Hyderabad, Mumbai, Pune	India, Sri Lanka, Bangladesh
Lightware Visual Engineering Italy	(Italy) Avezzano	Albania, Italy, Malta
Lightware Visual Engineering Latin America	(Colombia) Medellín, Mexico City	Colombia, Mexico
Lightware Visual Engineering Middle East	(United Arab Emirates) Dubai	Qatar, United Arab Emirates
Lightware Visual Engineering Nordics	(Sweden) Gothenburg	Estonia, Denmark, Finland, Norway, Sweden
Lightware Visual Engineering SEA	Singapore	Malaysia, Philippines, Singapore
Lightware Visual Engineering UK	(United Kingdom) London	United Kingdom, Ireland
