= Rába (automobile) =

The Rába was a Hungarian automobile manufactured from 1912 to 1914. Rába automobile was a subsidiary of the Rába (company) in Győr. A product of the Rába company in the city of Győr, the engine of the car was the 4.2-liter 58 hp (44 kW) Praga "Grand". The car was built in limited numbers, under the Praga license. Raba also produced cars of other licences, including Benz, Panhard, and Austro-Daimler. It exists to date as a manufacturer of trucks. The steward's office ordered a special RÁBA Grand for the personal use of Emperor Charles I of Austria. It was manufacturer of agricultural vehicles, like the Rába tractors.

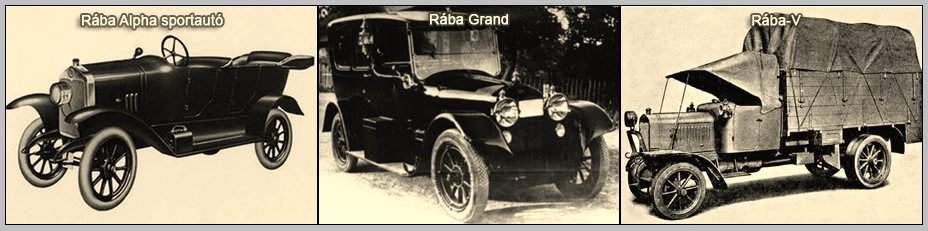
Automobiles of the Hungarian Rába Company, 1st: "Rába Alpha" sport car in 1914, 2nd: Rába Grand car from 1913, 3rd: Rába V truck from 1913

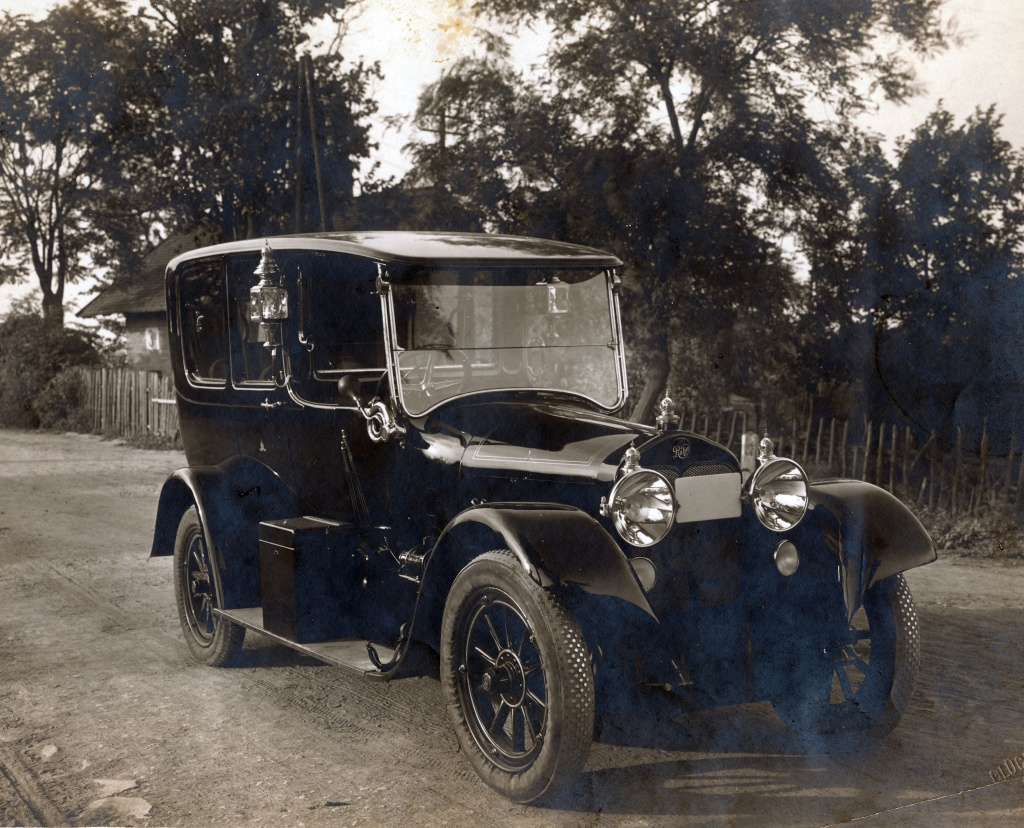
Raba grand in 1913
