= Traubi =

Soft drink brand

Traubi or traubisoda is a brand of soft drink flavored with grape juice. It is produced in Hungary, Austria and Croatia.

Before 1995, in Hungary, it was made by a factory called Traubi Hungaria located in the village of Balatonvilágos. The company produces the drink from a special type of Hungarian grapes, called saszla. The name Traubi derives from the German word Trauben that means grape. Visiting the factory in Balatonvilágos one can follow the steps of production from grapes harvest to bottling.

In Austria, it's produced by Waldquelle Kobersdorf GmbH from Kobersdorf. A Croatian company Trento sokovi licenses it from Waldquelle since 2006, and produces it in Brestovac.

== The History of Traubi ==
The aroma was originally invented by Lenz Moser of Austria in 1954. It was licensed to Traubi Hungaria in 1971. The new flavour became popular not only due to the successful advertisement but also as it appeared to be the first Hungarian fizzy drink. As a result of the growing interest, Traubi was also produced in Kunbaja, Csány and in Debrecen.

In response to the first fizzy drink success, in 1973 another product, called Márka, appeared on the Hungarian market. This drink proved to be popular that time just as well it is nowadays. Márka is liked for its special orange, grape, sour cherry and raspberry flavor.

In the 1980s, due to the spread of Coca-Cola, Traubi became less popular, the production decreased by 20%. In 1992, Traubi Hungaria bought the factory of the Traubi in Balatonvilágos. However, in 1995, the trademark itself of "Traubi" and the licence to produce this soft drink was bought by the Ráthonyi Ltd, after the bankruptcy of the Lenz Moser Ltd. Since 1995 both Traubi Hungaria and the Ráthonyi Ltd used the same trademark, which resulted in a two decades long criminal and civil trial between these two parties.

Salamon Berkowitz, the owner of the company Traubi Hungaria claimed that the original publicity campaign team, which had created the first campaign, was working on the company's advertisements and image. Despite these and the fact that Berkowitz used the former Traubi factory in Balatonvilágos and uses the same name as the original producer company had, several court rulings decided in favour of the Ráthonyi Ltd and condemned Berkowitz for fraud, tax evasion, and trademark infringement and imposed a fine on him and his accomplices.

== Popularity ==
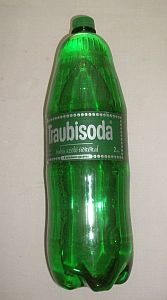
A bottle Traubisoda

The popularity of the drink was tested through a market research conducted by the producer. The findings clearly showed, that there was a strong nostalgia for the drink among Hungarians who were teenagers in the '80s. Drinking Traubi evokes memories from Hungarian people's past, therefore a special importance belongs to this drink.

== Márka ==
Márka is another soft drink product of the Traubi Hungaria. Its production started in 1973 and it is still popular. The company currently makes a variety of soft drinks. Márka soft drinks as of 2022 consists of pear-sage, ginger-lime, grape, sour cherry, jaffa, cola, orange and raspberry.

Márka also makes lemonade, iced tea, and flavoured water.
