= SIA Ltd =

SIA Ltd was a UK Limited company specialising in Geographic Information System (GIS) software and services. The company offices were based in London, England.

SIA products included Datamap, a PC-based mapping system with added features for transport and distribution managers.

== History ==
The company was bought by Hometrack in July 2007. It was based near the Eccleston Square Hotel, off the A3213.

== Products ==
- dataMAP GIS
- dataMAP GIS Web Browser
- dataMAP Mobile
- dataMAP Routing System
- SMART
- SMART Online
- dataMAPX and SMARTX SDKs

== Partners ==
- Ordnance Survey
- Plantech
- National Housing Federation
- IBS OPENSystems
- Encanvas
- Bartholomew Maps
- Arete
- Anite

== Competitors ==
- GGP Systems Ltd
- ESRI
- MapInfo
