= Jam2jam =

jam2jam is a family of audiovisual software for collaborative performance. The systems use generative algorithms for audio and visual material whose parameters are controlled by users with either a graphical user interface or external hardware controllers. jam2jam software applications can connect over local networks or the internet allowing real-time collaboration. This type of functionality is referred to as Network Jamming and is the topic of ongoing research.

== Description ==
The jam2jam software has been primarily employed to enable access to collaborative audiovisual performances, and is used in education and community arts settings. The software has also found application in assisting people with disabilities to participate in playful arts activities.

The Network Jamming research that surrounds the use of jam2jam is built on a constructivist epistemology and encourages learning about audio and visual media through interactive performances and making by video recording the performances. The jam2jam software facilitates this philosophical approach by enabling collaboration through network connections and allows performances to be recorded for review and sharing. There are a number of academic publications describing this research.
