= Rába (company) =

Truck and automotive component manufacturer

RÁBA Automotive Group
- Type: Public
- Traded as: BPSE: RABA; BUX Component
- Industry: Automotive industry
- Founded: 1896
- Headquarters: Győr, Hungary
- Key people: István Pintér (CEO&Chairman )
- Products: Military trucks, trucks, rail cars, trains, bridges steel structure
- Revenue: ▲HUF 47.9 billion
- Operating income: ▼HUF 1.9 billion
- Net income: −1,075,000 United States dollar (2022)
- Owner: Hyundai
- Number of employees: 1,990
- Website: raba.com

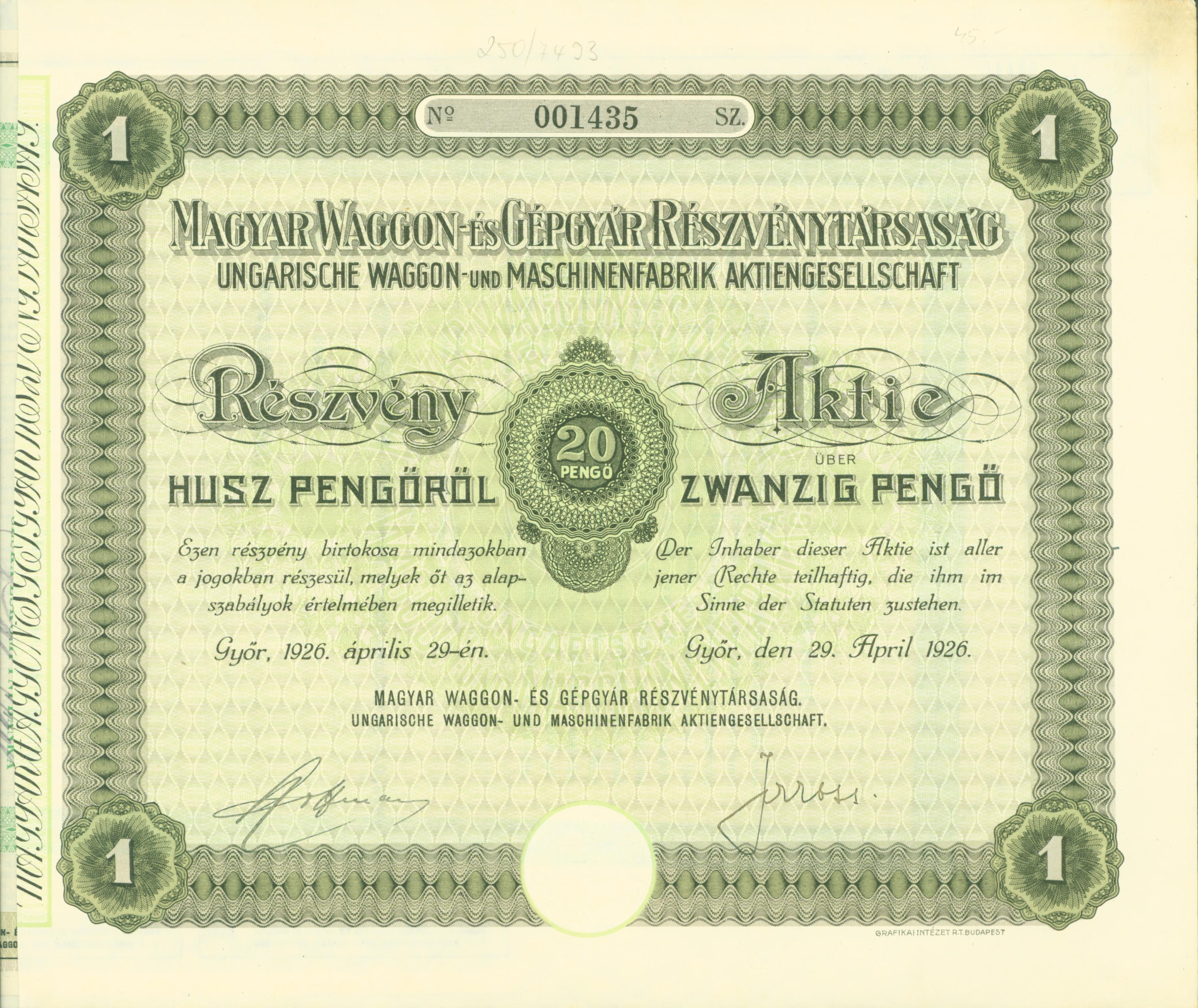
Share of the Rába company, issued 29. April 1926

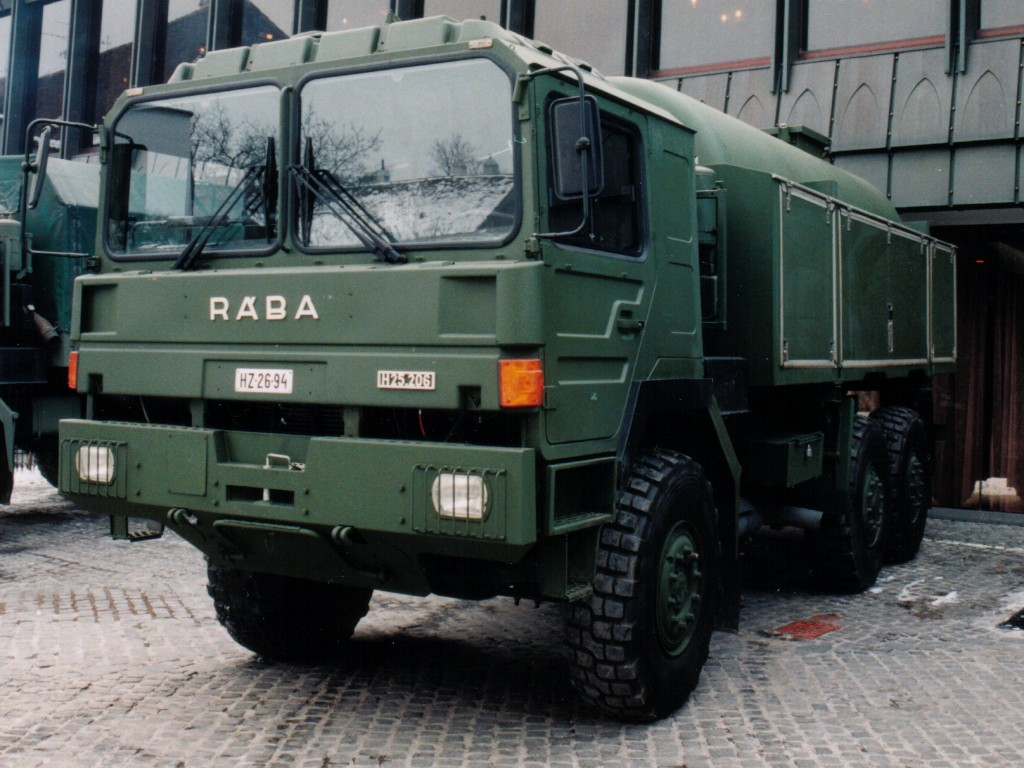
RÁBA Military truck

The RÁBA Automotive Group (Hungarian: Rába Járműipari Holding Nyrt.), commonly known as Rába, is a Hungarian public limited company, listed on the Budapest Stock Exchange. Rába engineers, manufactures and customizes automotive components, specialty vehicles and axles for commercial vehicles, agri-machinery and earth-movers. The Rába has been building axles as well as complete vehicles since 1902. The company has three strategic business units. The company is headquartered in Győr, employing more than 2000 people.

== History ==
The company was founded by local investor groups in Győr in 1896.

In 1899, the Rába had started to export to foreign countries: it supplied railway passenger carriages to Egypt, the East Indies, Southern Africa, city tramcars to Amsterdam and Antwerp. The carriages of the London underground railway were constructed and manufactured in the Rába company. The London Underground Railway ordered 30 multiple-unit trains, 66 passenger cars for multiple-unit trains and bogies. In 1904, the production of the first petrol engine powered trucks started. In 1914, the company started to produce its first passenger automobiles: The RÁBA Alpha. The steward's office ordered a special RÁBA Grand for the personal use of Emperor Charles I of Austria.

Rába's trucks originally used cabins supplied by West German MAN, but from 1980 on DAF's F241 cabin was used. A few Roman cabs (of MAN origins) were also supplied from Romania in return for engines. Rába's engine mainstay was itself of MAN origins, with the old D21 inline-six diesel massaged up to 300 PS (221 kW) with the help of turbocharging and intercooling.

In the 1980s, Rába built no more than about 2,000 trucks per year, although it was Hungary's third biggest employer. Being an important provider to Hungarocamion, a publicly operated international trucking firm, helped raise their international profile. In 1985, Rába's business mostly consisted of engine and axle manufacturing, with only 15% of turnover being represented by trucks. Of these trucks, however, nearly 90 per cent were exported, with most going to Yugoslavia. In 1986, Rába introduced a more powerful, 370 PS (272 kW) diesel engine (D11TLL) in order to help their trucks compete internationally and to meet Hungarocamion's needs. The new engine range was loosely based on the earlier MAN units, but were now of 11.05 litres, and were developed together with the Linz Institute of Graz, Austria.

== Models ==
- Rába U26
