= Zumtobel Group =

Austrian lighting technology company

Coordinates: 47°24′27″N 9°44′07″E

Zumtobel Group AG
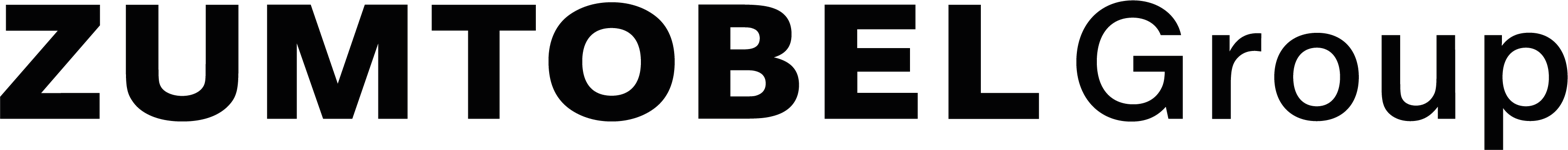
- Type: Aktiengesellschaft
- Traded as: WBAG: ZAG
- Industry: Lighting technology
- Founded: 1950
- Headquarters: Dornbirn, Austria
- Key people: Alfred Felder (CEO); Bernard Motzko (COO); Thomas Erath (CFO); Marcus Frantz (CDTO)
- Revenue: 1,209.2 million EUR (2022/23)
- Number of employees: 5,500 (2022/23)
- Website: Official website

The Zumtobel Group is an Austrian company specialising in lighting and headquartered in Dornbirn. Zumtobel engages in the development, production and sales of lighting, luminaires, lighting management and lighting components for indoor and outdoor applications. The company is a European market leader for professional lighting systems and the number two for lighting components in Europe.

The group operates 10 production facilities on three continents as well as sales and partner companies in nearly 90 countries.

Since 2007, the group has presented the Zumtobel Group Award (long name Zumtobel Group Award – Innovations for Sustainability and Humanity in the Built Environment) to architects and engineers every two years. The prize was worth 140,000 euros in 2012, 150,000 euros in 2017 and 120,000 euros in 2021.

== History ==
Walter Zumtobel (1907–1990) was one of roughly 300 so-called sequestrators in allied-occupied Austria who administered previously German-owned property in Vorarlberg, initially on behalf of the French military government, then based on an administrative law of the Federal Government of Austria. These properties included Michel-Werke in Bregenz and Hard as well as Werkzeugbau Arbeitsgemeinschaft Lustenau in Lustenau and Feinmechanische Werkstätte Josef Maurer in Wolfurt. He integrated these three formerly German companies into Elektrogeräte und Kunstharzpresswerk W. Zumtobel KG, which was founded on 1 January 1950 in Dornbirn, thus laying the foundation for today’s Zumtobel Group.

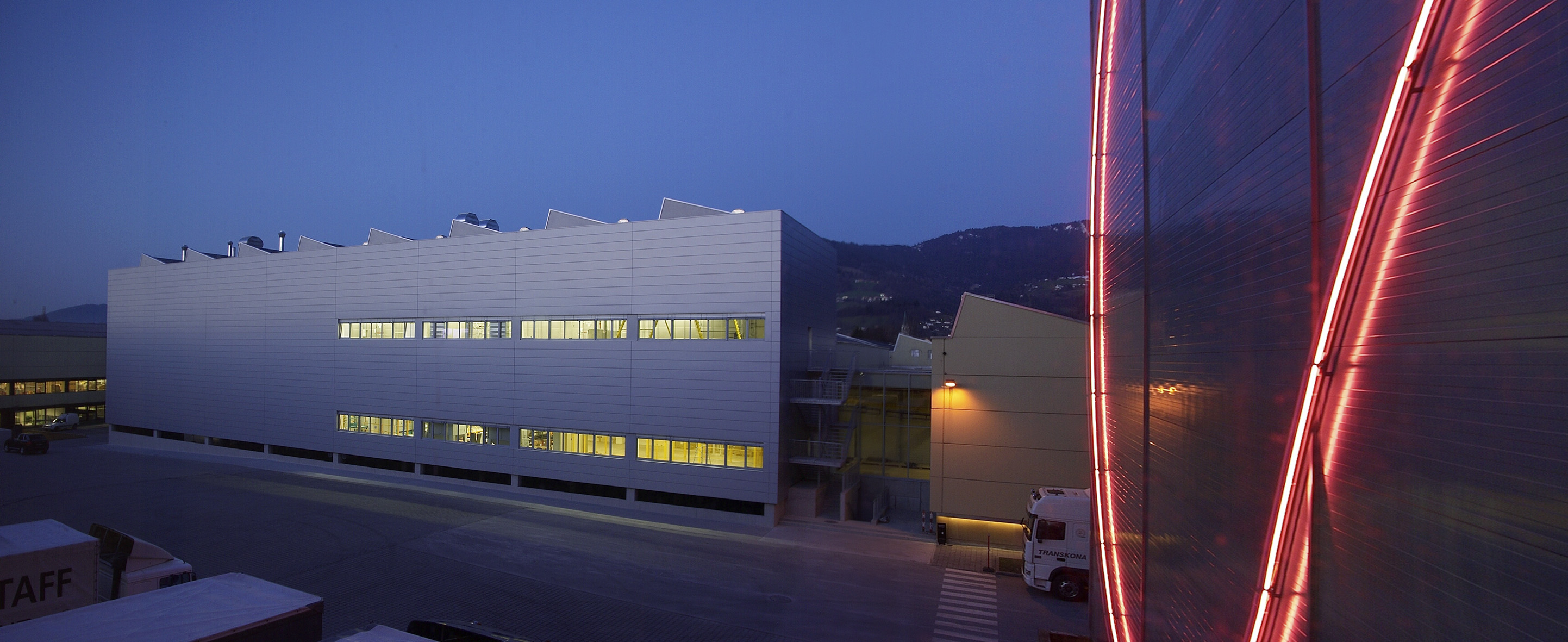
Zumtobel Group headquarters in Dornbirn, Austria

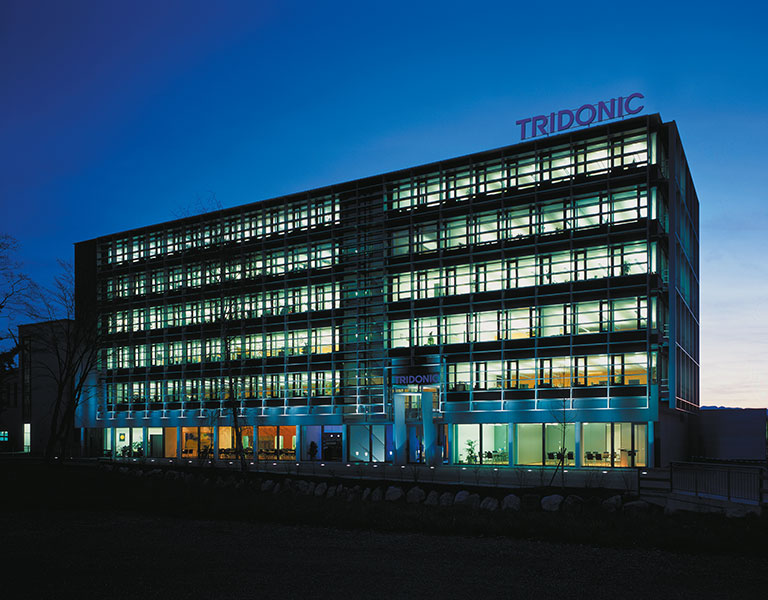
Tridonic headquarters in Dornbirn, Austria

Initially, the company primarily produced electrical ballasts for fluorescent light fittings. In 1952, the company started to manufacture complete luminaires based on fluorescent light fittings. Profilux, a particularly thin batten luminaire introduced to the market in 1953, became a sales success. In 1963, Zumtobel won the first design price for the FER recessed luminaire. In 1959, Walter Zumtobel travelled to the United States for the first time to visit the luminaire manufacturer Day-Brite Lighting, in St. Louis.

In 1959, a light laboratory was established to determine light distribution curves. The German company Staff, still autonomous as Staff & Schwarz Leuchtenwerke (founded in 1945), introduced the first voltage track system Lite-Trac in 1967. From 1956 to 1979, the company was a licensee of Lichttechnischen Spezialfabrik Dr. Ing. Schneider & Co. In 1976, Zumtobel received the National Award, which entitles companies to use the national coat of arms in business dealings. In the same year, the group became a stock corporation (Aktiengesellschaft).

In 1976, the company acquired a minority stake in the British company Tridonic Ltd. The remaining shares were acquired in 1983. Based on a purchase agreement of 2 March 1979, the factory of Dr. Ing. Schneider & Co. in Usingen was integrated into the company; on 28 March 1979, a contract was concluded to also transfer the operating business.

In 1991, the company was restructured and two divisions were established: Lighting Solutions (then Zumtobel Licht) and Lighting Components (then Tridonic-Bauelemente). In 1993, Zumtobel acquired a majority stake in the German Staff Group in Lemgo; the remaining shares were taken over in 1994. In 2000, the British company Wassall plc was acquired with the assistance of the American equity capital partner Kohlberg Kravis Roberts & Co. (KKR), and the Thorn Lighting Group was merged with Zumtobel’s luminaire business; the components business of Thorn was transferred to the Tridonic Division.

Since 2005, the LED-activities have been further developed. Lexedis Lighting in Jennersdorf was founded as a joint venture for high-performance LED light sources of Tridonic Optoelectronic (a joint venture of Tridonic and Lumitech, a spin-off of the Graz University of Technology) and Toyoda Gosei. LEDON Lamp GmbH (Dornbirn) is a wholly owned subsidiary of the Zumtobel Group for LED applications.

In May 2006, the Zumtobel Group went public on the Vienna Stock Exchange. In September 2006, the Zumtobel share was admitted to the ATX. KKR sold its remaining share of 5.5 percent after the initial public offering to an institutional investor in an off-exchange transaction in December 2006. This investor was apparently Delta Lloyd Asset Management NV. In any case, Zumtobel announced in a mandatory disclosure regarding the shareholder structure on 11 May 2011 that Aviva plc was no longer a shareholder of Zumtobel after its majority investment in Delta Lloyd had been terminated. At the time, Delta Lloyd held 6.778 percent of the 43.5 million shares; a few days later, Fidelity held 9.99 percent.

In 2009, the LED start-ups were combined into a separate division (LEDON brand). In 2013, LEDON was sold to the Austrian entrepreneur Thomas Lorünser with a retroactive effect from 1 November 2012. With effect from 24 September 2012, the Zumtobel share was removed from the ATX and has since been traded on the Prime Market.

In the past years, the Zumtobel Group executed projects such as the lighting of the BMW-plants in Berlin and Leipzig as well as of the Airbus plant in Bremen and the new headquarters of the pharmaceutical group Boehringer Ingelheim. In addition, the expansion of Beijing International Airport in China as well as parts of the Burj Khalifa in Dubai, the Emirates Palace in Abu Dhabi, the Bolte Bridge in Melbourne, Australia and the Cathedrale la Seu in Mallorca, Spain have been equipped with innovative lighting solutions. Other showcase projects of the Zumtobel Group include the Skylink terminal at Vienna Airport, with a contract volume of 10 million euros, the lighting of football stadiums such as the Allianz Arena, Munich and the Tottenham Hotspur Stadium as well as the Guggenheim Museum in Bilbao and the James Simon Gallery in Berlin, which was designed by David Chipperfield, or the Elbphilharmonie in Hamburg.

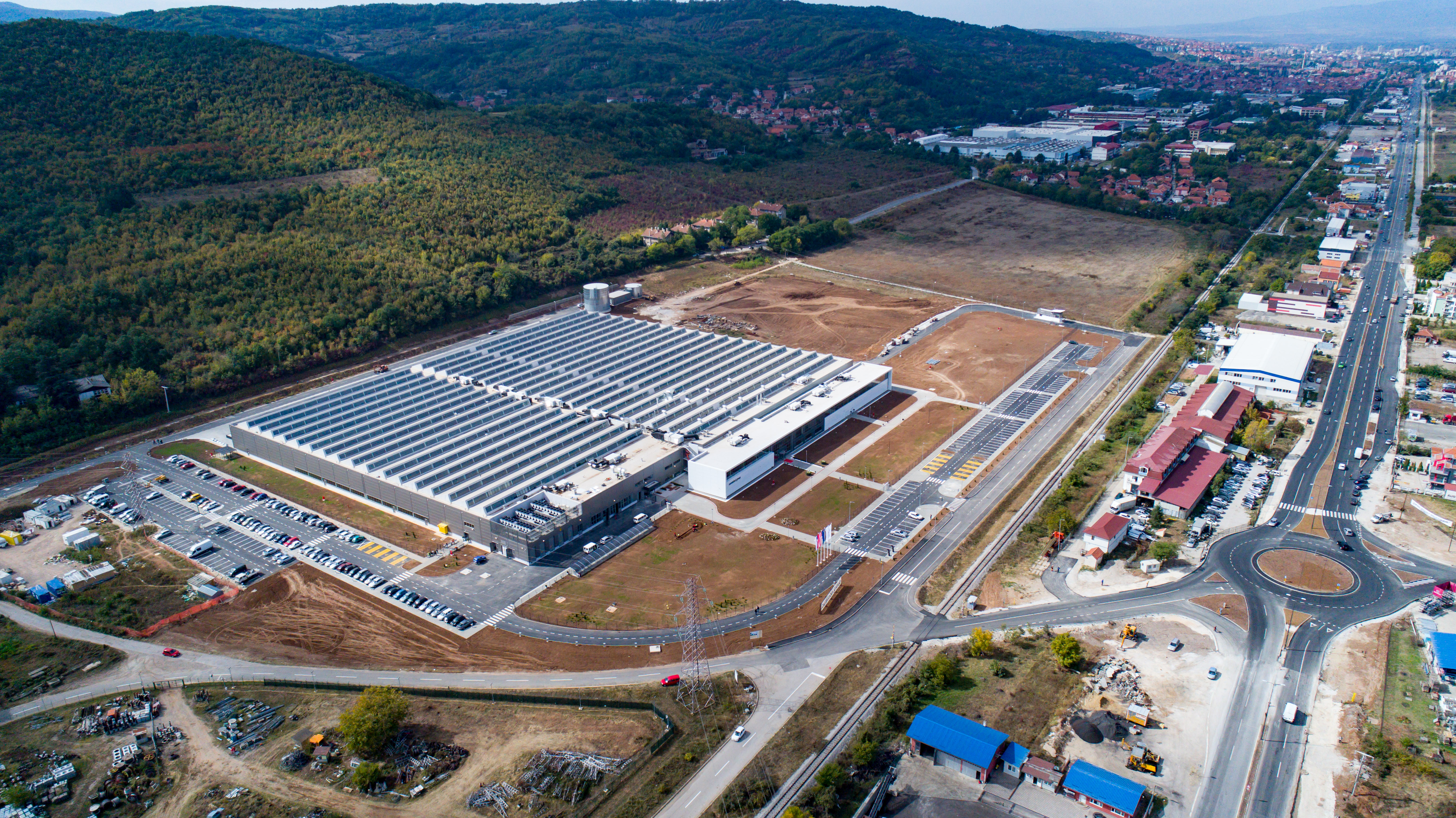
Zumtobel Group production site in Niš, Serbia

In November 2017, the long-time managing director Jürg Zumtobel was awarded the Ehrenpreis der Vorarlberger Wirtschaft für das unternehmerische Lebenswerk ("Vorarlberg business award for lifetime achievements"). Alfred Felder has been CEO since 6 June 2018; Thomas Tschol took over the function of CFO as of 1 April 2018; Bernard Motzko has been COO since 1 February 2018. On 1 August 2021, Thomas Erath was appointed CFO of the Zumtobel Group. In May 2020, Karin Zumtobel-Chammah was elected chairwoman of the supervisory board. After holding several senior management positions in the finance sector, she joined the Zumtobel Group in 1996. Zumtobel-Chammah headed the arts and culture department prior to joining the board in 2019.

In September 2018, the Zumtobel Group added a new group-wide luminaire and component production facility in Niš, Serbia, to its global production network, investing 30.6 million euros. The production site covering 40,000 square metres enables the Zumtobel Group to react more flexibly to changed market requirements and to strengthen its presence in these emerging markets.

In 2019, the Zumtobel Group opened a group-wide software center in Porto, Portugal. The new technology and innovation centre in Porto, headed by João Granjo Lopes, develops software for smart light management and control systems. It also focuses on research in areas such as smart buildings and smart cities, aiming to develop integrated lighting solutions for smart energy, mobility and IoT technologies. The group-wide software centre represents an addition to the existing research and development network of the Zumtobel Group.

In November 2020, the Zumtobel Group opened the new light forum at its main location in Dornbirn. For this purpose, the company's old factory hall in Höchsterstraße was refurbished within a year into a 4,000-square-metre presentation area, where lighting innovations can be experienced. To date, 8 million euros were invested in the new Light Forum. The design concept, developed in cooperation with the Innsbruck studio of the Norwegian architecture firm Snøhetta, created space for a world of light that customers can experience with all their senses. At the same time, the Zumtobel Group celebrated its 70th anniversary in 2020.

The company is researching more efficient lighting and light management to use lighting systems only when needed. In 2019, the European Investment Bank approved loans to broaden the company’s research into connecting lighting to digital services.

== Company structure ==
The group consists of two divisions: the Zumtobel Lighting Division for the lighting business with the Zumtobel and Thorn brands, and the Tridonic Division for the components business.

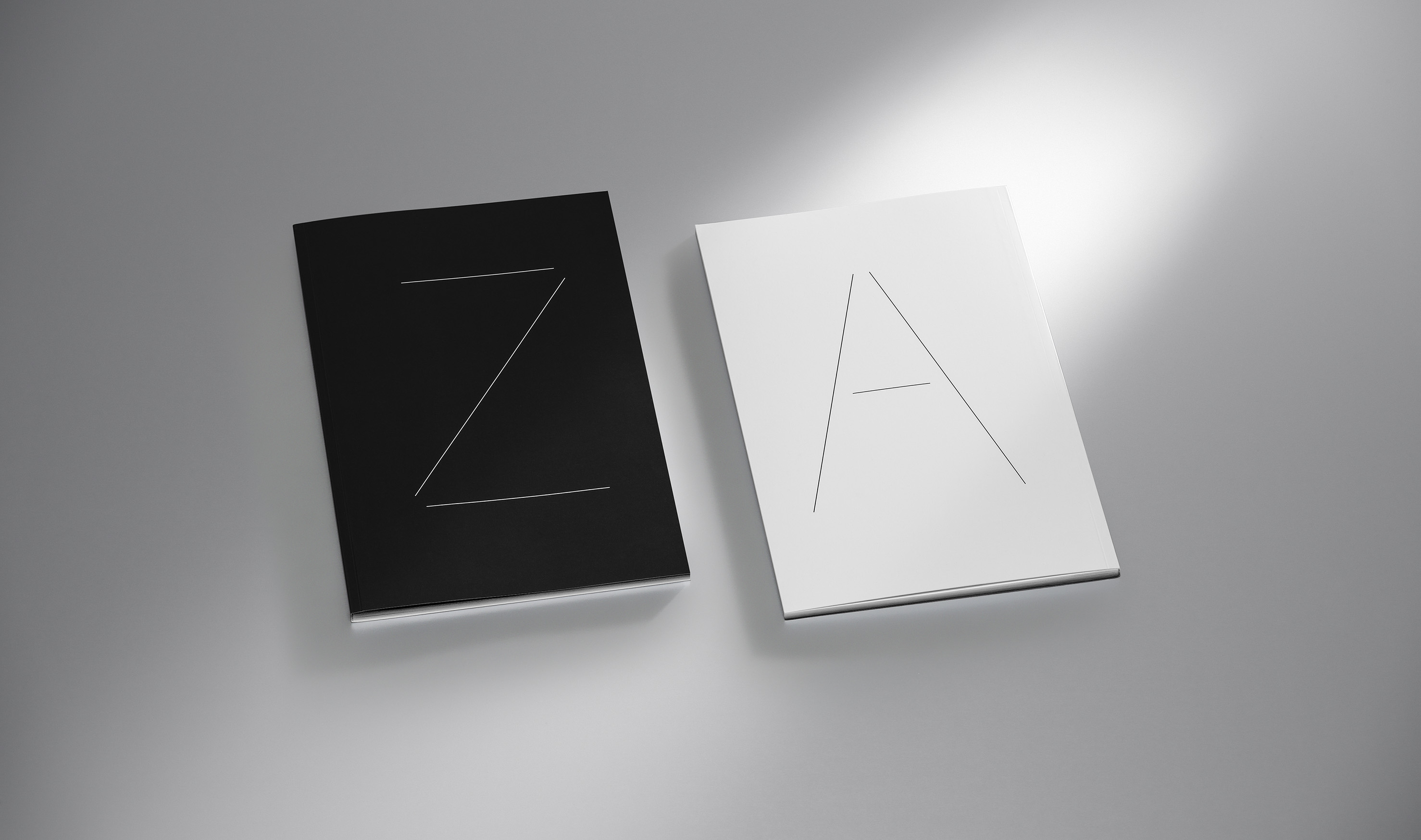
Annual Report 2018/19 designed by Dietmar Eberle

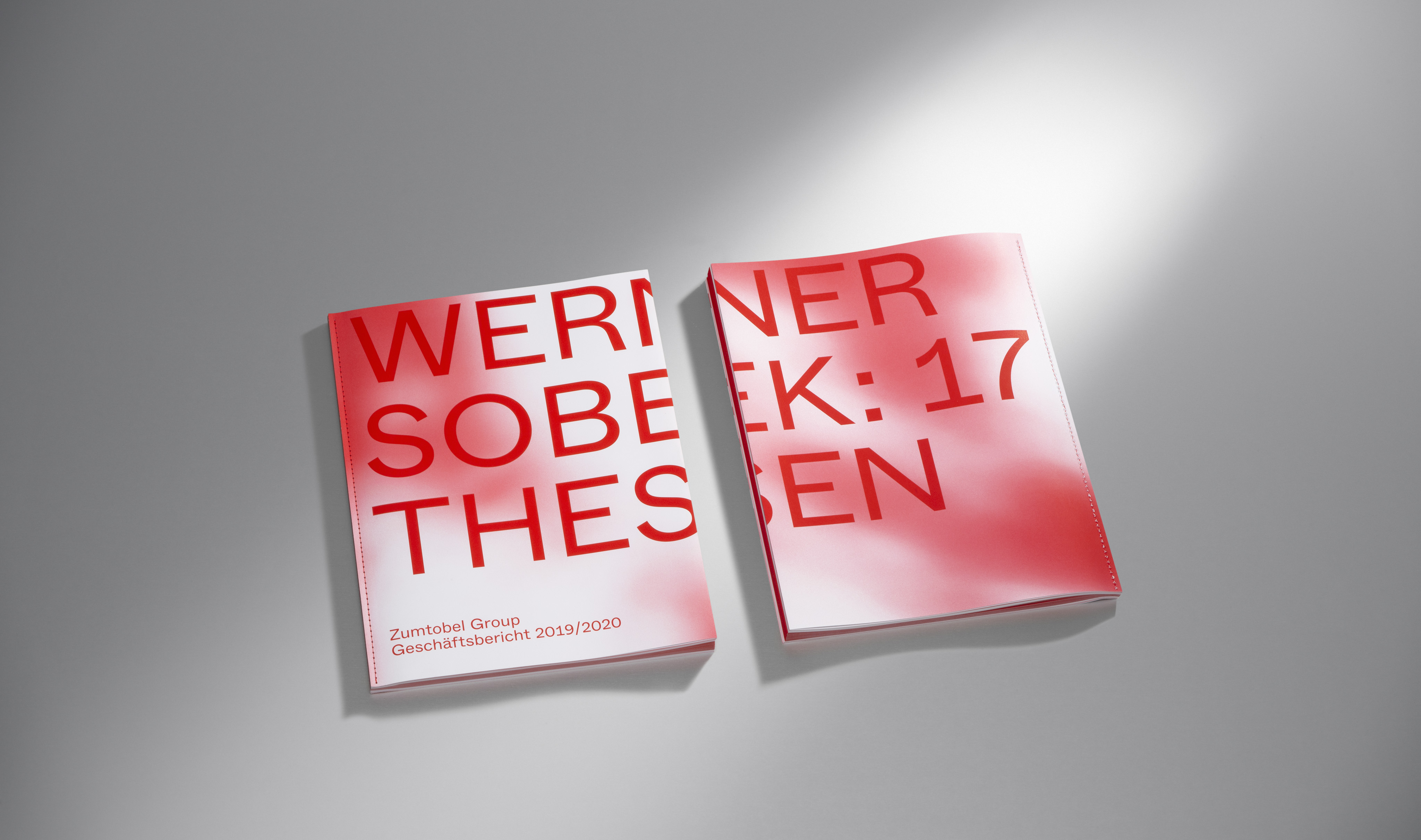
Annual Report 2019/20 designed by Professor Werner Sobek

The Zumtobel family holds approximately 36 percent of the shares in the company. The remaining shares are largely held by institutional investors.

== 2017–2021 financial results ==
In the financial year from May 2017 to April 2018, the company recorded a loss of 46.7 million euros due to pricing pressure and currency effects and did not pay out a dividend for this period. Revenue declined by 8 percent and the share of LEDs in revenue increased from 73.6 to 79.6 percent. In 2018/19, the Zumtobel Group significantly reduced the net loss from 46.7 to 15.2 million euros. As a result of uncertainties related to Brexit and price pressure caused by intense competition in the lighting industry, revenue declined by 2.9 percent to 1.162 billion euros. The operating result (EBIT) improved from minus 7.3 million to 2.7 million euros. Profitability also increased compared to the previous year. Group EBIT, adjusted for one-off effects, rose by 8 million euros to 27.6 million euros. Return on sales improved to 2.4 percent. On 25 June 2020 the Zumtobel Group announced the figures for the 2019/20 financial year: net profit for the year rose by 30 million euros to a plus of 14.5 million euros. Adjusted Group EBIT almost doubled to 53.9 million euros despite a slight decline in revenues due to the global COVID-19 pandemic. The EBIT margin increased from 2.4 percent to 4.8 percent. In the 2020/21 financial year, the Zumtobel Group recorded a more than 100% increase in net profit to 45.6 million euros, despite a 7.7 percent decline in revenues due to the ongoing effects of the COVID-19 pandemic. Adjusted Group EBIT thus rose by 23.4 percent to 43.4 million euros. In the 2021/22 financial year, Group sales increased to 1,148.3 million euros and EBIT to 60.8 million euros. Net profit was 45.8 million euros.

== Artistic annual report ==
Ever since 1991, the Zumtobel Group has invited figures from the fields of architecture, graphic design and art to present their take on the subject of light and the development of the company. In this task, the artists are given freedom in terms of design, unhampered by any corporate design considerations. The outcome, year after year, is a series of unconventional unique printed works. In addition to graphic designers like Italo Lupi, Neville Brody, Per Arnoldi and Stefan Sagmeister, with whom the artistic design began, artists including Gerhard Merz, Siegrun Appelt, Olafur Eliasson, Anish Kapoor and James Turrell as well as architects like Dominique Perrault, Hani Rashid / Asymptote, François Roche / Studio R&Sie(n), Sejima Kazuyo and Ryue Nishizawa / SANAA, David Chipperfield / DCA, Kjetil Thorsen / Snøhetta, Elizabeth Diller / Scofidio and Renfro and Yung Ho Chang / Atelier FCJZ have been commissioned to design the Artistic Annual Report. The edition 2019/20 was designed by architect and consulting engineer Professor Werner Sobek. The 2020/21 edition was created by Dutch architect Iwan Baan in interdisciplinary collaboration with Berlin-based architect Francis Kéré. The report presents the role of natural light in the vernacular architecture of Burkina Faso, Africa, capturing the strong contrasts between the blinding sunlight outside the buildings and the complete darkness inside. The Artistic Annual Report 2021/22 was designed by Ben van Berkel, UNStudio, and used transformation as a central theme in architecture and the built environment.
