= PX Index =

Czech stock market index

The PX Index (until March 2006 the PX 50) is a capitalization-weighted index of major stocks that trade on the Prague Stock Exchange. It is calculated by the Vienna Stock Exchange. At the time of its inception, the calculation start date for the index was set to the 5th April 1994 and its opening value was fixed at 1,000 points. At this time the index included 50 companies traded on the Prague Stock Exchange, being named accordingly as PX 50.

In 2014, the Prague Stock Exchange introduced the total return index PX-TR. It shares the same base as the PX Index but, unlike the PX index, the PX-TR takes dividends into account.

Passive exposure to the index is provided through an exchange-traded funds. First is since 2018 small Bulgaria domiciled Expat Czech PX UCITS ETF, traded in euro and listed on the Frankfurt Stock Exchange's Xetra segment. From September 2026, an ETF domiciled in the Czech Republic is also expected to be available and traded on the Prague Stock Exchange.

== History ==
=== PX-50 ===
After an initial boom encouraged by voucher privatization (the top was in February 1994 retroactively calculated on 1245 points) the index started to decline fast, and ended the year 1994 with 557 points. In 1995 the decline continued (influenced by the Mexican crisis, that discouraged foreign investors from emerging markets) and the index reached its first bottom on 29 June with 387 points. Then the index increased slowly and ended the year 1995 with 426 points. The slow increase continued in 1996 and the index reached its second top on 25 February 1997 with 629 points. In 1998, influenced by the 1998 Russian financial crisis, the index reached its historical bottom on 8 October with 316 points. In 1999 the index emerged back to 500 points. With the help of the dot-com bubble and starting banks privatization, the index reached its second top on 24 March 2000 with 691 points. With the end of dot-com bubble and the IPB Bank crisis, the index declined back to 500 points. In 2001, the index slightly decreased and after the September 11, 2001, attacks reached bottom on 17 September with 320 points. In 2002, the index slowly increased back to 500 points. In 2003 the index was rising and ended the year with 659 points. With the help of the Czech Republic European Union accession, the index continued rising in 2004. It reached 1000 points on 19 November and ended the year with 1032 points. The index continued rising in 2005 and ended the year with 1473 points.

== PX index ==
On 20 March 2006 the PX 50 index was merged with PX-D into the PX index. The index reached bottom on 13 June with 1167 points after legislative elections, but ended the year with 1589 points. On 29 October 2007 it reached its top with 1936 points and ended the year with 1815 points. Due to the 2008 financial crisis, the index declined to 700 points on 27 October 2008, losing 50% of its value in two months; a second bottom was reached on 18 February 2009 at 629 points.

year
max
min

1994	1995	1996	1997	1998	1999	2000	2001	2002	2003	2004	2005	2006	2007	2008	2009	2010	2011	2012	2013	2014	2015	2016	2017	2018	2019	2020	2021	2022	2023	2024	2025
1,245	587	582	629	517	526	691	515	479	659	1,032	1,478	1,626	1,936	1,808	1,195	1,315	1,275	1,041	1,066	1,046	1,058	954	1,087	1,140	1,119	1,142	1,426	1,482	1,421	1,726	2,686
541	387	438	459	316	333	410	320	388	460	662	1,051	1,167	1,565	700	629	1093	843	859	853	901	846	819	919	978	989	690	1,029	1,114	1,207	1,419	1,764

== PX Index base ==
The components as of August 2026 are sorted by reduced market capitalization:

- ERSTE BANK (ISIN: AT0000652011)
- ČEZ (ISIN: CZ0005112300)
- KOMERČNÍ BANKA (ISIN: CZ0008019106)
- VIG (ISIN: AT0000908504)
- MONETA MONEY BANK (ISIN: CZ0008040318) - since 2016
- CSG (ISIN: NL0015073TS8) - since 2026
- COLTCZ (ISIN: CZ0009008942) - since 2020
- PHILIP MORRIS ČR (ISIN: CS0008418869)
- DOOSAN ŠKODA POWER (ISIN: CZ1008000310) - since 2025
- KOFOLA ČS (ISIN: CZ0009000121) - since 2016
- PRIMOCO UAV (ISIN: CZ0005135970) - since 2024
- GEVORKYAN (ISIN: SK1000025322) - since 2024
- KARO LEATHER (ISIN: CZ0009008819) - since 2026
- PHOTON ENERGY (ISIN: NL0010391108) - since 2021

=== Past ===
- PILULKA LÉKÁRNY - since 2022, removed in 2023
- AVAST (ISIN: GB00BDD85M81) - since 2018, removed in 2022
- O2 C.R. (ISIN: CZ0009093209) - removed in 2022
- STOCK (ISIN: GB00BF5SDZ96) - since 2013, removed in 2021
- SAB FINANCE (ISIN: CZ0009009940) - since March 2021, removed on December 2021
- PEGAS NONWOVENS (ISIN: LU0275164910) - removed in 2020
- CETV (ISIN: BMG200452024) - removed in 2020
- UNIPETROL (ISIN: CZ0009091500) - removed in 2018
- FORTUNA ENTERTAINMENT GROUP (ISIN: NL0009604859) - since 2010, removed in 2018
- PLG (ISIN: CZ0005124420) - removed in 2016
- NWR (ISIN: GB00B42CTW68) - removed in 2016
- ORCO (ISIN: LU0122624777) - removed in 2014
- TMR (ISIN: SK1120010287) - removed in 2014
- AAA (ISIN: NL0006033375) - removed in 2013
- KITD (ISIN: US4824702009) - removed in 2012
- ECM (ISIN: LU0259919230) - removed in 2011
- ZENTIVA (ISIN: NL0000405173) - removed in 2009

== PX-TR ==
In March 2014 Prague Stock Exchange introduced new total return index PX-TR. The index shares same base as PX index, but unlike PX index take into account dividends. As the starting exchange day (a benchmark date) was selected 20 March 2006, when PX-50 and PX-D were merged. Main aim of creation of PX-TR index was to promote above average dividend yield of Prague Stock Exchange.
