= PEMA Holding =

Austrian real estate company

- Industry: Real Estate
- Founded: 2005
- Founder: Markus Schafferer
- Headquarters: Innsbruck, Austria
- Products: real estate development, financing
- Website: http://pema.at/

The PEMA Holding is an Austrian real estate company. It developed several real estate projects in Austria, Germany and South Tyrol. The company with locations in Innsbruck and Vienna is owned by Markus Schafferer.

== History ==
The PEMA Holding was founded by Markus Schafferer in 2005. Schafferer used the connections he acquired through selling art to find investors for his projects and opened the Headline tower, the first big project of the company, in 2012. The tower holds office, retail and gastronomy space and a hotel.

In 2014, the company bought the Porr tower and opened their office in Vienna. In 2015, the development of the second PEMA tower (P2) began, which is 50 metres high and cost 60 million Euros. It holds apartments, gastronomy and retail spaces and also an open community space which was designed by Andreas Braun, former CEO of Svarovski-Kristallwelten.

Since 2016 the former CA- mmo boss Bruno Ettenauer is a consultant for PEMA, in 2017 former Austrian chancellor Werner Faymann also started to support the company as a consultant.

In 2017, PEMA also started developing the former headquarter of the Creditanstalt in Vienna.

The planning of the third PEMA tower, which will be developed out of the Porr tower, began in 2018. It will contain a Motel One hotel, office and retail space. The finalisation is planned to be in 2020.

== Company structure ==
The company is owned with 100% by Markus Schafferer.
