= Vienna Insurance Group =

Austrian multinational company

Vienna Insurance Group AG Wiener Versicherung Gruppe
- Type: Aktiengesellschaft
- Traded as: WBAG: VIG; PSE: VIG
- ISIN: AT0000908504
- Industry: Financial services
- Predecessor: Anglo-Danubian Lloyd, Allgemeine Versicherungs-AG; Janus, Allgemeine Versicherungs-Anstalt auf Gegenseitigkeit; Wechselseitige Brandschaden- und Janus, allgemeine Versicherungsanstalt a.G. Wiener Städtische Versicherung
- Founded: 1824
- Headquarters: Vienna, Austria; 48°13′02″N 16°22′13″E
- Key people: Elisabeth Stadler (CEO), Günter Geyer (Chairman of the supervisory board)
- Products: Life and general insurance
- Revenue: €9.657 billion (2018)
- Net income: €268,900 million (2018)
- Total assets: €51,163 million (2018)
- Total equity: €5,835 million (2018)
- Number of employees: 25,947(2018)
- Website: www.vig.com

Vienna Insurance Group AG Wiener Versicherung Gruppe (VIG) with its registered office in Vienna, Austria, is one of the largest international insurance groups in Central and Eastern Europe with approximately 25,000 employees.

== History ==
The history of Vienna Insurance Group dates back to 1824, with the founding of the k.u.k. priv. wechselseitige Brandschaden Versicherung.

In the end of the 1980s, the company started expanding in central and eastern Europe, founding Kooperativa in Czechoslovakia.

In 1994, the company was transformed into a corporation, and 11% of the stock was introduced on the Vienna Stock Exchange, in the form of preferred shares. Those were changed into common shares in 2005, as the company increased its capital by about €900 million to finance acquisitions.

In 2006, the brand Vienna Insurance Group was introduced as a global brand. In central and eastern Europe, subsidiaries use it next to their original name.

In 2008, a new capital increase permitted the acquisition of the insurance business of Erste Group, which turned VIG to the market leader in central and eastern Europe. Simultaneously, a long-term sales agreement was signed with Erste Group. In the same year VIG founded ViG Re, a reinsurance company located in Prague, Czech Republic.

During the 2010 shareholder meeting, it was decided to create a 100% subsidiary for the insurance business in Austria, Wiener Städtische Versicherung AG Vienna Insurance Group.

In March 2014, it was revealed that PZU and Vienna Insurance Group were in the race to acquire rival Lietuvos Draudimas for around $147 million.

== Management ==
Headquarters of the Vienna Insurance Group in Vienna

Since January 1, 2016, Elisabeth Stadler is the Chairwoman of the Managing Board of Vienna Insurance Group. She also serves as General Manager and CEO.

- Chairwoman of the Managing Board Elisabeth Stadler (CEO)
- Member of the Managing Board Liane Hirner (CFO)
- Member of the Managing Board Franz Fuchs
- Member of the Managing Board Peter Thirring
- Member of the Managing Board Judit Havasi
- Member of the Managing Board Peter Höfinger

The supervisory board consists of ten members, with Elisabeth Stadler being chairwoman.

== Structure ==
With its internationalisation strategy in the CEE economic region, Vienna Insurance Group made the transition from a national insurance company to an international insurance group with more than 50 insurance companies in 25 countries. In total, about 50% of all group premiums already come from the Central and Eastern European markets.

Vienna Insurance Group is active in Austria, Albania, Bulgaria, Germany, Estonia, Georgia, Croatia, Latvia, Liechtenstein, Lithuania, Macedonia, Montenegro, Poland, Romania, Serbia, Slovakia, Czech Republic, Turkey, Hungary, Ukraine, Belarus and Bosnia and Herzegovina through interests it holds in insurance companies. The Group also has branch offices in Italy and Slovenia.

Market	Group Company	Market Entry
Austria	Wiener Städtische; Donau Versicherung; Sparkassen Versicherung	1824
Germany	InterRisk Versicherungs-AG; InterRisk Lebensversicherungs-AG	1990
Liechtenstein	Vienna-Life	1999
Italy	Wiener Städtische (branch), Donau Versicherung (branch)	1999
Slovenia	Wiener Städtische Zavarovalnica (branch)	2004
Poland	Compensa; InterRisk; Polisa; Skandia	1998
Czech Republic	Kooperativa; ČPP; PČS; VIG Re	1990
Slovakia	Kooperativa; Komunálna; PSLSP	1990
Croatia	Wiener osiguranje; Erste osiguranje	1999
Serbia	Wiener Städtische Osiguranje	2002
Montenegro	Wiener Städtische Osiguranje	2010
Macedonia	Winner; Winner Life; Makedonija Osiguruvanje	2007
Albania	Sigma Interalbanian; Intersig	2007
Kosovo	Sigma Interalbanian Kosovo (branch)	2007
Hungary	Union Biztosító; Erste Biztosító; Vienna Life Biztosító	1996
Bulgaria	Bulstrad; Bulstrad Life	2002
Romania	Omniasig; Asirom; BCR Life	2001
Ukraine	Jupiter; Kniazha; Globus; UIG	2004
Belarus	Kupala	2002
Turkey	Ray Sigorta	2007
Georgia	IRAO; GPIH	2006
Estonia, Latvia, Lithuania	Compensa; Compensa Life; Baltikums AAS	2008
Bosnia and Herzegovina	Wiener Osiguranje	2011
Moldova	Donaris	2014

== Listing ==
Since 1992 the company is listed on the Vienna Stock Exchange, and since 2005 it has been a member of the Austrian Traded Index. The major shareholder is Wiener Städtische Wechselseitiger Versicherungsverein – Vermögensverwaltung – Vienna Insurance Group, with a stake of about 70%.
