= Valneva SE =

Franco-austrian vaccine company

- Type: Societas Europaea
- Traded as: Euronext Paris: VLA; CAC Mid 60
- ISIN: FR0004056851
- Industry: Biotechnology
- Predecessor: Merger of Intercell and Vivalis SA
- Founded: 2013
- Headquarters: Saint-Herblain, France
- Key people: Thomas Lingelbach (CEO), Anne-Marie Graffin (Chairwoman of the Board of Directors)
- Products: Development of vaccines
- Website: www.valneva.com

Valneva SE is a specialty vaccine company registered in Saint-Herblain, France, developing, producing and commercializing vaccines for infectious diseases. It has manufacturing sites in Livingston, Scotland; Solna, Sweden, and Vienna, Austria; with other offices in France, Canada and the United States.

== Background ==
Valneva was founded in 2013 through the merger of Austrian company Intercell and French company Vivalis SA. It has been listed since May 2013 on Euronext Paris Paris and since May 2021 on the US Nasdaq. Valneva used to be listed on the Vienna Stock Exchange.

== Products ==
=== Marketed vaccines ===
Vaccines marketed by Valneva include Ixiaro, a vaccine against Japanese encephalitis (approved in Europe, America and Australia) Dukoral, a vaccine against cholera and LT-ETEC (approved in Europe, Canada and Australia) and IXCHIQ, a vaccine against the chikungunya virus (live-attenuated, single-dose).

In 2026, Valneva and Pfizer announced that the European Medicines Agency (EMA) had accepted for review the marketing authorization application for their Lyme disease vaccine.

=== Failed developments ===
Some of its candidates have failed in clinical trials: VLA43, a therapeutic vaccine against Pseudomonas aeruginosa, V710, a therapeutic vaccine against Staphylococcus aureus (in collaboration with Merck), and IC41, therapeutic vaccine against hepatitis C.

=== R&D ===
Valenava announced positive results of its Phase 1 clinical trial in November 2025, but added that despite the medical need, regulatory pathways and market opportunities for potential Zika vaccines remain uncertain unless the company finds a major investor.

=== COVID-19 vaccine ===
Valneva along with Dynavax Technologies developed a candidate inactivated whole virus vaccine against COVID-19, VLA2001, derived from its Ixiaro Japanese encephalitis vaccine, which underwent a Phase 1/2 trial in the United Kingdom. The Phase 1/2 trial had 150 participants, testing three dose levels for safety, tolerability, and immunogenicity. The trial was expected to be complete by 15 February 2021, with full reporting completed by August 2021.

Valneva and dynavax technologies had reached an agreement with the UK government to provide up to 100 million doses to be manufactured at its facility in Livingston, Scotland. The UK government pre-ordered 60 million doses. The trials were supported by the UK National Institute for Health Research and four British universities. Due to government support, Valneva would progress immediately into Phase 3 trials and develop production capacity before the full evaluation of the Phase 1/2 trial, rather than the traditional slower sequential approach which has lower financial risk.

The company manufacturing facility in Livingston, Scotland produces the VLA2001 vaccine.

In September 2021, Valneva announced that the UK government had cancelled their vaccine order. The cancellation reason was not officially given, but seemed to be related to difficulties getting building materials due to Brexit and not vaccine quality.

On 14 April 2022, the UK Medicines and Healthcare products Regulatory Agency (MHRA) approved the vaccine, being the first in the world to do so.

On 17 May 2022 the European Commission cancelled its advance purchase agreement for the vaccine which would have seen Valneva provide 60 million doses over two years.

In June 2026, the company officially relocated its head office to Lyon.
