= Moneta Money Bank =

Czech bank, formerly GE Money Bank

- Trade name: Moneta Bank
- Formerly: GE Capital Bank (1998–2005); GE Money Bank (2005–2016)
- Type: Public
- Traded as: Prague Stock Exchange: MONET; PX component
- ISIN: CZ0008040318
- Industry: Financial services
- Founded: 1998
- Headquarters: Prague
- Area served: Czech Republic
- Key people: Tomáš Spurný (CEO)
- Products: Retail banking, business banking, mortgages, consumer finance
- Revenue: 13,924,000,000 Czech koruna (2025)
- Net income: CZK 6.5 billion (2025)
- Total assets: 504,549,000,000 Czech koruna (2025)
- Number of employees: 2,433 (2026)
- Subsidiaries: Moneta Stavební Spořitelna; Moneta Auto; Moneta Leasing
- Website: www.moneta.cz/web/en

Bank headquarters in Prague

Moneta Money Bank, a.s. (stylised as MONETA), also known as Moneta Bank, is a Czech bank headquartered in Prague. Previously owned by General Electric, it became a publicly traded company in 2016. Its shares are listed on the Prague Stock Exchange and they are part of the PX Index.

== History ==
The bank was established as GE Capital Bank in 1998. That year, it received a banking licence and took over Agrobanka's branch network and most of its balance sheet. It changed its name to GE Money Bank in January 2005.

The bank changed its name to Moneta Money Bank in May 2016, when its shares were listed on the Prague Stock Exchange. General Electric gradually reduced its holding during the following months and sold its last shares in November 2016.

In December 2019, Moneta agreed to buy Wüstenrot's Czech building savings bank and mortgage bank. The €175 million deal closed on 1 April 2020. Wüstenrot stavební spořitelna was later renamed Moneta Stavební Spořitelna. The mortgage bank was merged into Moneta Money Bank in January 2021.

Moneta also pursued two unsuccessful transactions with PPF involving Air Bank and Home Credit's Czech and Slovak businesses. The first ended in February 2019 after Moneta sought a revised terms in response to shareholder concerns.

PPF made another proposal in 2021. Moneta's shareholders approved the transaction in December, but the deal was called off in May 2022. PPF cited changes in economic conditions, including higher capital requirements and interest rates.

== Operations ==
Moneta provides retail banking services and lends to sole proprietors, smaller companies and agricultural businesses. It also offers building savings, vehicle financing and leasing, and distributes insurance and investment funds.

At the end of 2025, the group served approximately 1.6 million retail and commercial customers. The bank had 122 branches and 561 its own ATM. Its customers could also use ATMs in a shared network. Its partners in the network are Komerční banka, Air Bank and UniCredit Bank.

== Ownership ==
Moneta is listed on the Prague Stock Exchange with a free float of about 59% in 2025. It is the part of the of the PX Index with a weight of about 13% in November 2026. The largest shareholder as of October 2026 was Tanemo (PPF Group) with 29.94% stake. Mythessa Holdings, controlled by Pavel Tykač, and Manecomte, part of J&T Private Equity Group, each held about 10%.
