= S IMMO =

Austrian real-estate company

S IMMO AG
- Type: Public (Aktiengesellschaft)
- Traded as: WBAG: SPI
- ISIN: AT0000652250
- Industry: Real estate
- Founded: 1987
- Headquarters: Vienna, Austria
- Key people: Radka Doehring (Member of the management board); Tomáš Salajka (Member of the management board)
- Revenue: EUR 336.5m (2023-12-31)
- Number of employees: 611
- Website: www.simmoag.at

S IMMO AG is a real estate investment company that invests in properties in Austria, Germany and Central and Eastern Europe. As of the end of 2023, its property assets totalled just under EUR 3.5 billion.

The real estate company has been listed on the Vienna Stock Exchange since 1987. Its portfolio comprises residential, office and commercial properties, as well as hotels.

== History ==
The first real estate security to be listed on the Vienna Stock Exchange – s Immobilien-Fonds Nr. 1, the precursor to today's s-Immo-Invest participating certificate – was launched on 19 October 1987. Sparkassen Immobilien Anlagen AG merged with Die Erste Immobilien AG in 2002. Following a capital split (1:20), Die Erste Immobilien Aktie became the S Immo share, which made its debut on the Vienna Stock Exchange with a new identification number on 28 June 2002.

S IMMO was listed on the ATX, the benchmark index of the Vienna Stock Exchange, from September 2017 to November 2022.

CPI Property Group S.A. published on 21 November 2022 that it holds a total of 88.37% of the share capital of S IMMO directly as well as indirectly through Immofinanz AG.

== Property portfolio ==
S IMMO AG's portfolio comprises residential, office and commercial space as well as hotels in Austria, Germany, Slovakia, Czechia, Hungary, Romania and Croatia. As of the end of 2023, the property portfolio consisted of 244 properties with 1.5 million m^{2} of gross lettable area and represented EUR 3,477.6 million in property assets. In terms of book value, properties in Germany accounted for 15.7% of the portfolio, real estate in Austria 22.0% and assets in Central and Eastern Europe 37.7%. As of 31 December 2023, commercial properties made up of 67.2% office buildings, 19.4% retail properties 6.1% residential properties and 7.3% hotels. The occupancy rate for the overall portfolio was 90.6%. The total rental yield amounted to 6.8%.
