= Florian Koschat =

Austrian entrepreneur and investment banker

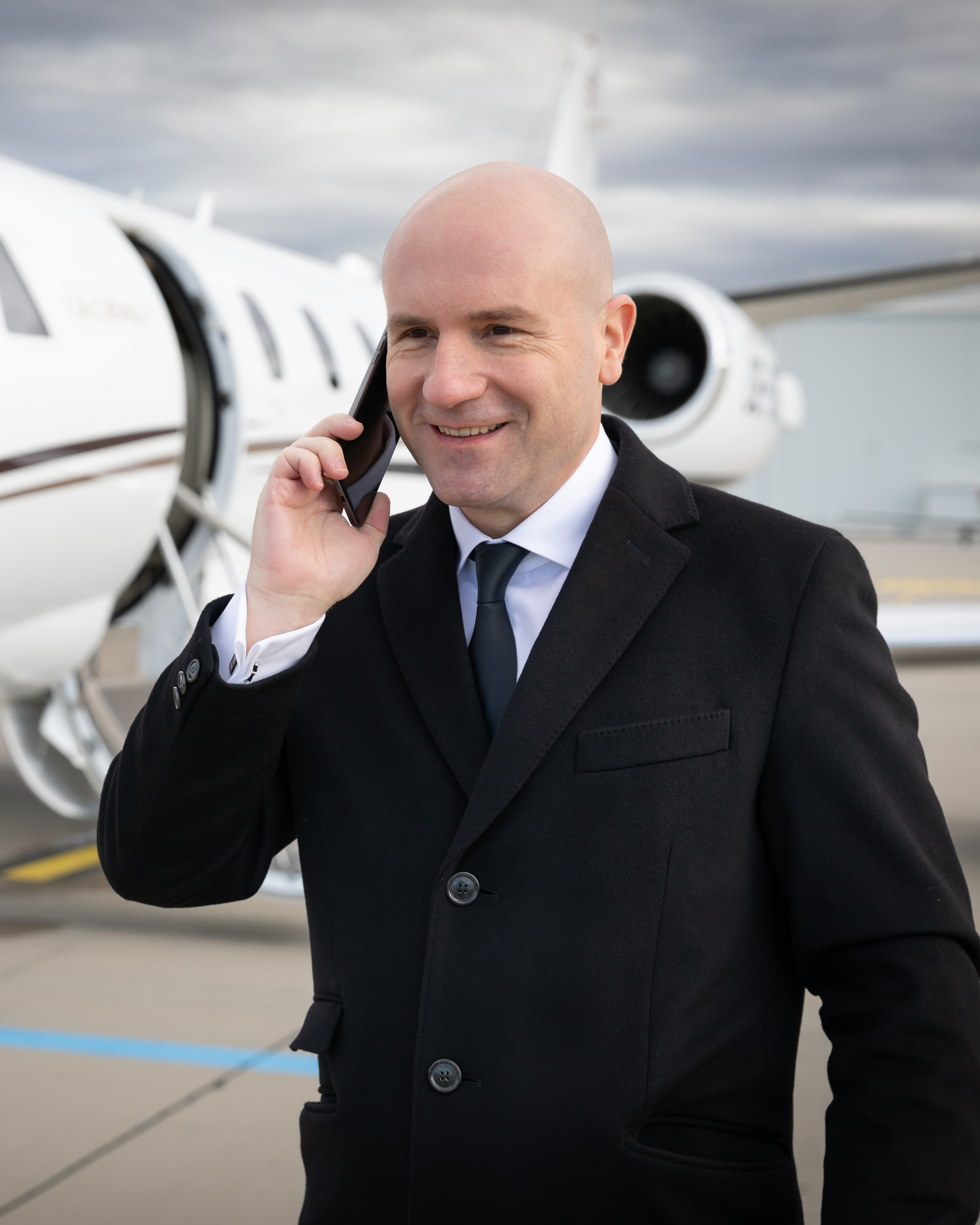
- Born: September 21, 1974 (age 52); Carinthia, Austria
- Occupations: Investment banker, author and Senator in the Senat of Economics

Florian Koschat (born September 21, 1974, in Carinthia, Austria) is an Austrian entrepreneur and investment banker.

== Early life ==
Koschat grew up Hörzendorf (Carinthia) in Austria. In his school days he became aware of the advantages of being wealthy. During his school years, he earned his first money as a musician and bandleader and started investing at an early age. He studied Business Administration at the Vienna University of Economics and Business and graduated with a doctorate in 2000.

== Private life ==
He keeps his private life largely out of the public eye. It is known that he has several children with at least 4 women.

== Career ==
Prior to 2007, Koschat was Vice President of the Anglo Irish Bank, responsible for Russia and the regional intergovernmental organization CIS. In 2007, Koschat also founded his own company Pallas Capital.

Koschat was appointed to the Supervisory Board of CA Immo in May 2016 for the core shareholder O1. After the sale of the O1 shares to Immofinanz a power struggle arose around the largest real estate companies in Austria. This fight was triggered by a takeover bid by the Starwood Capital Group, which was threaded by Koschat and two other members of the board. Koschat served on the Supervisory Board of CA Immo for the full five-year term. Since May 2021, he has no longer been part of the CA Immo Supervisory Board.

As CEO of PALLAS CAPITAL Group AG, Koschat takes over medium-sized companies and develops them further together with the management. He also invests in the German real estate market. Koschat is also known for his performances in social media.

== Books ==
- Betriebsgeheimnisse. Edition Roesner, October 2019, ISBN 978-3903059818
- Trotzdem reich!: Wie Du trotz armer Eltern reich wirst. semper fi GmbH, April 2025, ISBN 978-3950572209
- Eine Biene namens Bitcoin: Alles was Ihr Kind über Geld wissen sollte. semper fi GmbH, May 2025, ISBN 978-3950572216
- Grundsätze für unternehmerischen Erfolg: Wie man eine Vision mit dem richtigen Know-how und mit Tatkraft realisiert. Edition Roesner, June 2025, ISBN 978-3950571134
