= FACC =

FACC may refer to:

- African Federation of Film Critics (French: Fédération africaine de la critique cinématographique)
- FACC AG (formerly Fischer Advanced Composite Components), an Austrian company in the aviation industry
- Fanconi anemia, complementation group C, a protein that delays the onset of apoptosis and promotes homologous recombination repair of damaged DNA
- Fellow of the American College of Cardiology
- Ford Aerospace Corporation, the aerospace and defense division of Ford Motor Company
