= Austrian Traded Index =

Stock market index

The Austrian Traded Index (ATX) is the most important stock market index of the Wiener Börse. The ATX is, like most European indices, defined as a price index and currently consists of 20 stocks.

== Annual Returns ==
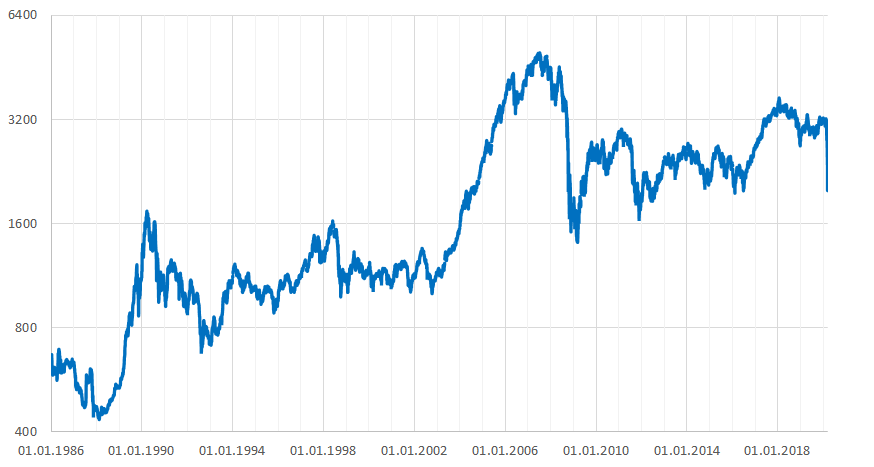
Evolution of the ATX index since 1985.

The following table shows the annual development of the Austrian Traded Index since 1985.

Year	Closing level	Change in index in points	Change in index in %
1985	662.01		
1986	636.48	−25.53	−3.86
1987	473.61	−162.87	−25.59
1988	535.97	62.36	13.17
1989	1,164.22	628.25	117.22
1990	1,038.54	−125.68	−10.80
1991	883.25	−155.29	−14.95
1992	747.70	−135.55	−15.35
1993	1,128.78	381.08	50.97
1994	1,055.24	−73.54	−6.51
1995	959.79	−95.45	−9.05
1996	1,140.19	180.40	18.80
1997	1,294.94	154.75	13.57
1998	1,120.77	−174.17	−13.45
1999	1,197.82	77.05	6.87
2000	1,073.30	−124.52	−10.40
2001	1,140.36	67.06	6.25
2002	1,150.05	9.69	0.85
2003	1,545.15	395.10	34.36
2004	2,431.38	886.23	57.36
2005	3,667.03	1,235.65	50.82
2006	4,463.47	796.44	21.72
2007	4,512.98	49.51	1.11
2008	1,750.83	−2,762.15	−61.20
2009	2,495.56	744.73	42.54
2010	2,904.47	408.91	16.39
2011	1,891.68	−1,012.79	−34.87
2012	2,401.21	509.53	26.94
2013	2,546.54	145.33	6.05
2014	2,160.08	−386.64	−15.18
2015	2,396.94	236.86	10.97
2016	2,618.43	221.49	9.24
2017	3,420.14	801.71	30.62
2018	2,745.78	−674.36	−19.72
2019	3,186.94	441.16	16.07
2020	2,780.44	−460.50	−12.76
2021	3,861.06	1,080.62	38.87
2022	3,126.39	−734.67	−19.03
2023	3,434.97	308.58	9.87
2024	3,663.01	228.04	6.64
2025	5,326.33	1,663.32	45.41

== Components ==
As of April 2026, the index includes the following companies.

Company	Industry	Sector
Erste Bank	Financials	Banking
Verbund	Utilities	Electric Utilities
OMV	Basic Industries	Oil & Gas
BAWAG	Financials	Banking
Andritz	Industrial Goods & Services	Industrial Engineering & Machinery
Wienerberger	Basic Industries	Construction Materials
Voestalpine	Basic Industries	Mining & Metals
Raiffeisen International	Financials	Banking
Porr	Construction	
CA Immo	Financials	Real Estate
EVN Group	Utilities	Electricity
AT&S	Industrial Goods & Services	Electronics
Austrian Post	Industrial Goods & Services	Transportation
Vienna Insurance Group	Financials	Insurance
Lenzing	Basic Industries	Chemicals
Uniqa Insurance Group	Financials	Insurance
Schoeller-Bleckmann Oilfield Equipment	Basic Industries	Oil & Gas
Immofinanz	Financials	Real Estate
Strabag	Construction	
Do & Co	Consumer Products	Food, Beverage & Tobacco

=== Companies Removed ===
Since 2011, the following companies have been removed from the ATX:

- Vienna International Airport
- Bwin
- Intercell
- Semperit
- AMAG Austria Metall
- Telekom Austria
- FACC
- Mayr-Melnhof Karton
- S IMMO

=== Performance and year-end values ===
The ATX closed the year of 2018 at 2.745,78.

In 2015, the Austrian Traded Index closed at 2.396,94 (Dec 30, 2015). The previous years' closing values were 2.401,21 (2012), 2.546,54 (2013), and 2.160,08 (2014).
