= Porr =

Austrian construction company

PORR AG
- Type: Aktiengesellschaft
- Industry: Construction
- Founded: 1869 (as Allgemeine österreichische Baugesellschaft)
- Headquarters: Vienna, Austria
- Key people: Karl-Heinz Strauss (CEO)
- Revenue: 4.65 billion EUR (2020)
- Number of employees: 19,828
- Website: porr-group.com/en/

PORR AG (stylised by the company as PORR AG) is an Austrian construction group headquartered in Vienna. Listed on the Vienna Stock Exchange, it is among the largest construction companies in Austria and operates internationally across major segments of the construction industry, including civil engineering, tunnelling, building construction, environmental engineering, and facility management.

The company traces its origins to 1869, when it was founded as Allgemeine Österreichische Baugesellschaft, making it the oldest company still listed on the Vienna Stock Exchange. The name PORR derives from construction engineer Arthur Porr, co-founder of A. Porr Betonbau, which merged with the company in 1927.

== History ==
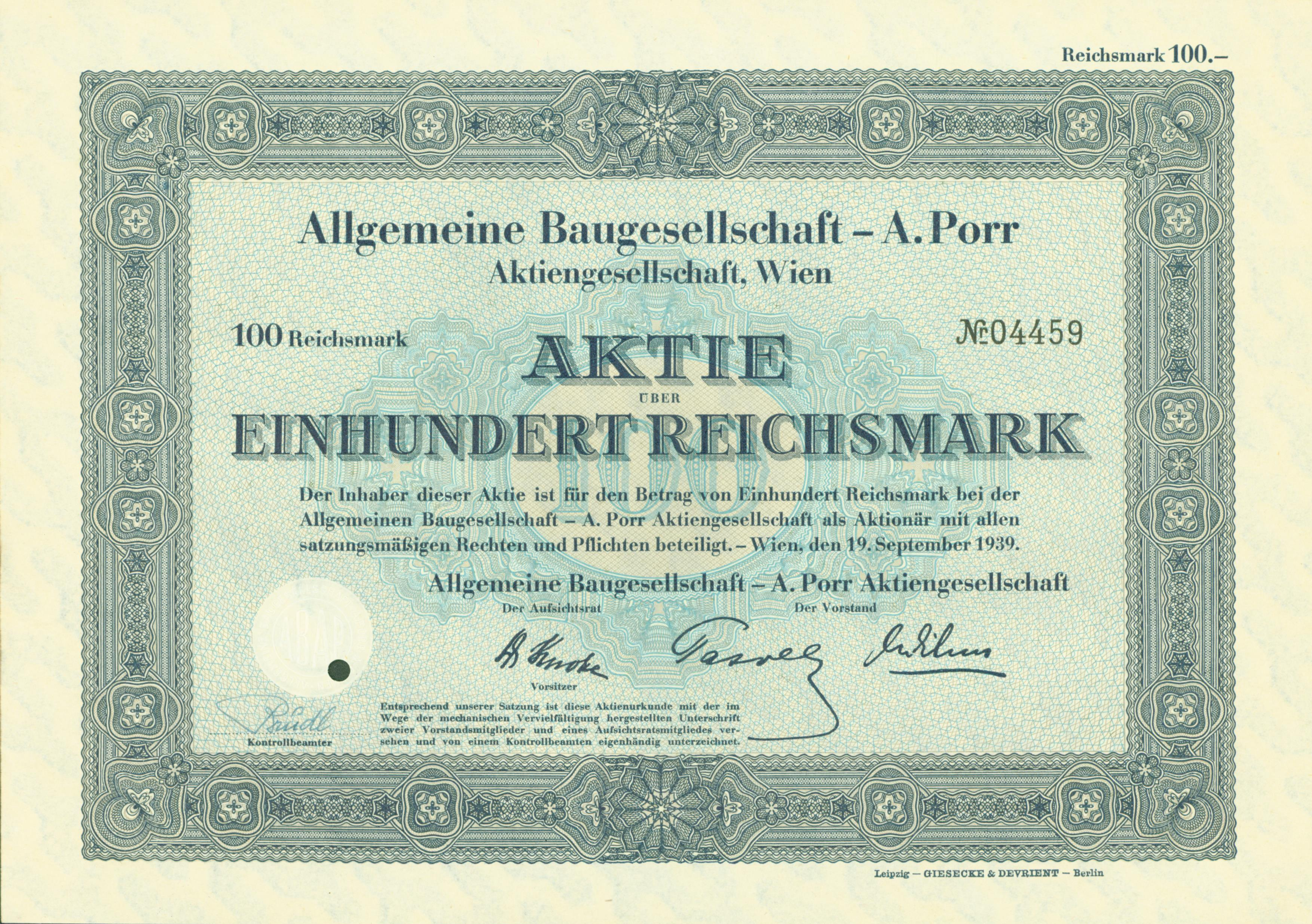
Share certificate of Allgemeine Baugesellschaft – A. Porr AG, 1939

The company was established in Vienna in 1869 and was first listed on the Vienna Stock Exchange on 8 April of that year. In the late 19th century, it participated in the construction of numerous prominent buildings along the Vienna Ring Road, including the Haus der Industrie, and built exhibition pavilions and hotels for the 1873 World Exposition in Vienna.

In 1927, the two parent companies merged to form Allgemeine Baugesellschaft – A. Porr Aktiengesellschaft. During the interwar period, the company undertook major infrastructure projects, including the construction of the Grossglockner High Alpine Road. After World War II, PORR became increasingly involved in large national projects and in the development of office and commercial buildings, such as the Ringturm in Vienna.

In the 1970s, the company contributed to the development of the New Austrian Tunnelling Method, which had a significant impact on modern tunnelling techniques. From the late 20th century onward, PORR expanded beyond Austria into other European markets and the Middle East. In 2000, it became the majority owner of Teerag-Asdag, then one of Austria’s leading road construction companies.

Since September 2010, PORR has been led by CEO Karl-Heinz Strauss. Under his tenure, the group underwent restructuring and consolidation. In 2013, the company was renamed from Allgemeine Baugesellschaft – A. Porr AG to PORR AG. In 2014, its real-estate division was spun off, leaving PORR focused exclusively on construction. In 2017, the company acquired the Oevermann Group from Heijmans.

PORR was included in the Austrian Traded Index (ATX) in 2018.

== Corporate structure ==
PORR AG functions as an operational holding company. The group is organised into three main business units:

- Business Unit 1 covers Austria and Switzerland as well as industrial construction activities.
- Business Unit 2 comprises operations in Germany.
- Business Unit 3 focuses on Central and Eastern Europe and selected international project markets, including the Middle East and Northern Europe.

Additional holdings are managed under a central investment and management division. The company is governed by an executive board.

== Range of services ==
PORR provides services across the construction value chain, from planning and design to construction, operation, and redevelopment.

- Building construction: offices, residential and public buildings, healthcare facilities, industrial plants, and sports venues.
- Civil engineering: tunnels, bridges, rail systems, power plants, and major road infrastructure.
- Infrastructure: transport networks, foundation engineering, pipeline construction, and large-scale engineering projects.
- Environmental engineering: remediation of contaminated sites, waste treatment facilities, and environmental protection systems.

== Selected projects ==
- Sections of the Stuttgart 21 rail project and the Wendlingen–Ulm high-speed line (Germany)
- Headquarters of Vienna Networks, Vienna (Austria)
- Renovation of the Theater in der Josefstadt, Vienna (Austria)
- Construction of the Sava Bridge, Belgrade (Serbia)
- Second tube of the Tauern Tunnel (Austria)
- Albula Tunnel (Albulatunnel II) for the Rhaetian Railway (Switzerland)

== Shareholder structure ==
A syndicate formed by the Strauss Group and IGO Industries Group holds a majority of voting rights, while the remainder of shares is publicly traded.

Shareholder	% held
Free float	46.3%
Syndicate (Strauss Group, IGO Industries Group)	53.7%
