= AT&S =

Austrian company

AT & S Austria Technologie & Systemtechnik Aktiengesellschaft

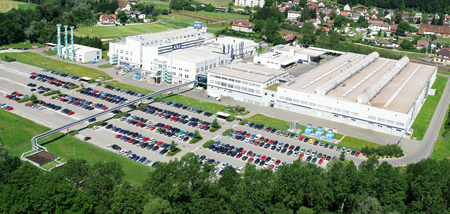
- AT&S Headquarters in Leoben (Austria)
- Company type: Public
- Traded as: WBAG: ATS; ATX Index component
- ISIN: AT0000969985
- Industry: Electronics
- Founded: 1987
- Headquarters: Leoben in Styria, Austria Austria
- Area served: Worldwide
- Key people: Michael Mertin (CEO) Gerrit Steen (CFO) Peter Griehsnig (CTO) Andy Mattes (Chair of the Supervisory Board)
- Products: Printed circuit board & high-end Integrated circuit (IC) substrates
- Revenue: ▲€1.8 billion (2026)
- Number of employees: 14,000 (2025/26)
- Website: ats.net/en/

AT&S also known as AT & S Austria Technologie & Systemtechnik Aktiengesellschaft designs and manufactures high-end printed circuit boards and IC substrates (Integrated circuit) for semiconductors. The company is listed on the Vienna Stock Exchange since 2008.

The company has six production sites worldwide

- Leoben & Fehring, Austria
- Nanjangud, India
- Chongqing & Shanghai, China
- Kulim, Malaysia

and 9 sales support offices

- San Jose & Chicago,USA
- Düren, Germany
- Stockholm, Sweden
- Bengaluru, India
- Seoul, South Korea
- Tokyo, Japan
- Taipei, Taiwan
- Hong Kong, China

== Products, Customers & Business Units ==
AT&S is a supplier for the following companies:

- AMD High-end Integrated Circuit (IC) substrates for data center processors for AMD
- Apple (Mobile Devices & Substrates): AT&S was among the Top 200 worldwide suppliers for Apple in 2015 and 2016
- Fairphone: in 2015 AT&S became a supplier of Fairphone.
- Sony Ericsson: AT&S became an awarded supplier of Sony-Ericson in 2017

AT&S is supporting the current roll-out of the 5G mobile communications generation with high frequency (HF) optimized interconnect solutions by developing and producing hybrid-PCB structures.

== History ==
=== 2024 until today ===
On September 23, 2024, AT&S and the Italian company SO.MA.CI.S. S.p.A. signed an agreement for the sale of AT&S Korea CO., LTD. and thus the AT&S plant in Ansan, South Korea. The purchase price (equity value) amounted to approximately EUR 405 million.

On September 30, 2024, Andreas Gerstenmayer, who had been CEO of AT&S since February 2010, resigned for personal reasons.

On February 26, 2025, it was announced that Dr. Michael Mertin will be the new CEO of AT&S AG for the next three years from May 1, 2025.

On June 3, AT&S officially opened its new Competence Center for R&D and IC Substrate Production in Leoben, Austria. With the opening of “Hinterberg 3” (HTB3), AT&S is the first and only company in Europe with local capabilities for developing and producing IC substrates, which are critical components that deliver power and data to semiconductors in high-performance microchips.

In the course of the supervisory board meeting after the 31st Annual General Meeting of AT&S AG on July 3, 2025, Andy Mattes was elected as the new chairman of the supervisory board of AT&S AG.

On August 8, 2025, CFO Petra Preining announced that she will retire as CFO of AT&S AG on August 31, 2025. The supervisory board was tasked with finding a suitable successor.

On December 22, 2025, AT&S announced that Gerrit Steen would assume the position of CFO effective February 1, 2026. With his appointment, the company will transition to a streamlined executive board structure comprising three members: the chief executive officer (CEO), the Chief Financial Officer (CFO), and the Chief Technology Officer (CTO).
