= Imperial and Royal Technical Military Academy =

Military academy in Austria

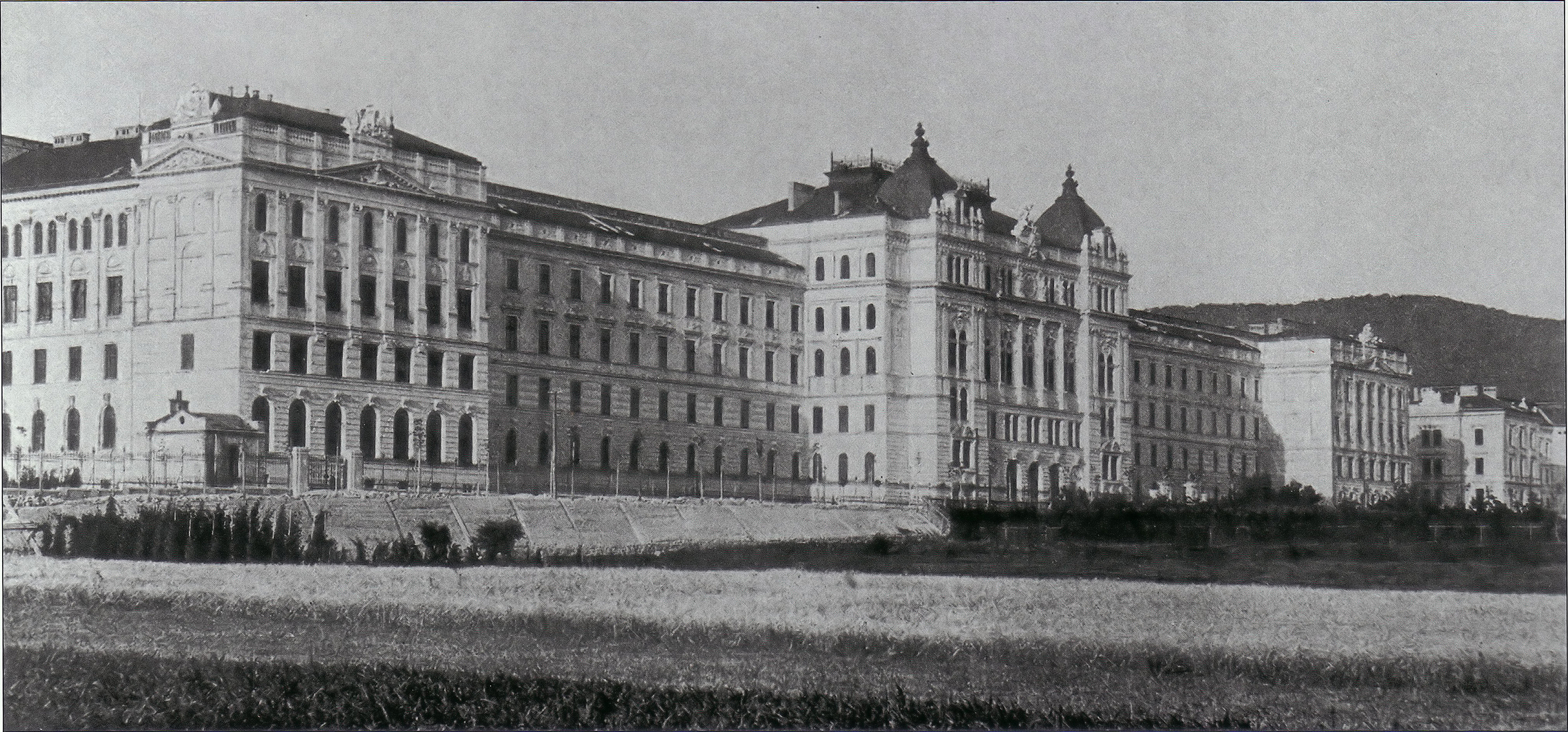
- Type: Military academy
- Established: 1717
- Location: Vienna, Znaim and Mödling

The Imperial and Royal Technical Military Academy (German: k.u.k. Technische Militärakademie) was a military training facility founded in 1717 for certain officer groups of the Habsburg monarchy. The location of the academy changed several times in the course of its existence: originally located in Vienna, it was located in Klosterbruck near Znaim from 1851 to 1869, in the Stiftskaserne in Vienna from 1869 to 1904 and finally in Mödling from 1904 to 1918. The Higher Technical Education Institute Mödling emerged from the academy in 1919.

== History ==
=== 18th century ===
The origins of the Technical Military Academy of the Austro-Hungarian Army up to 1918 go back to Field Marshal Prince Eugene of Savoy. During the War of the Spanish Succession he recognized the shortage of military engineers in the Habsburg army and urged Emperor Charles VI to set up a corresponding training facility (formal engineering academy). This was then implemented provisionally in 1717 and permanently in 1720. The Technical Military Academy was thus much older than the Theresian Military Academy founded in Wiener Neustadt in 1751. Between 1718 and 1743, some 300 pupils attended the academy. Its first principal, deputy-director and lead instructor was the engineer, cartographer and lieutenant colonel Leander Anguissola.

In 1743, the Imperial Councilor, astronomer, mathematician and head of the academy Johann Jakob Marinoni submitted a memorandum to the regent Maria Theresa, in which he referred to the urgently needed establishment of a military engineering corps, which took place in 1747. In the years that followed, the military engineering academy changed name and location in Vienna several times.

Marinoni died in 1755 and the institution was combined with the Chaos Foundation (which had served as a civil and military engineering orphanage since the late 1730s) and the Savoyard Noble Academy (Savoyische Ritterakademie, created in 1749) as a government-controlled engineering school in 1756. In 1760 it was totally militarized and put under the control of the corps of engineers. The best students joined the corps, while the rest were sent to infantry and cavalry regiments.

=== 19th century ===
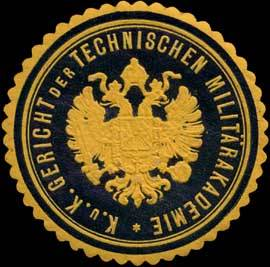
Sealing stamp of the academy, 1850–1923

Under Emperor Francis II the engineering academy reached the peak of its reputation and can be described as the most important technical university of the Habsburg monarchy. The academy was also reformed by merging the military engineer corps with the less academically educated sappers and miners to form the “genius corps”. It now actually consisted of two academies, one for future artillery officers and the other for genius officers. As a result, the academy temporarily lost some of its high reputation and in 1851 even had to go into exile as a genius academy in Klosterbruck near Znaim.

In 1869 the institute returned to the collegiate barracks in Vienna and remained there until it moved to the newly constructed building in Mödling in 1904. According to István Deák, the Technical Military Academy consistently produced highly qualified artillerymen, fortress builders and sappers. Its graduates had extraordinary knowledge, formed an exclusive circle and were highly respected.

=== 20th century ===
Since the buildings of the Viennese collegiate barracks no longer met the requirements of a technical military academy towards the end of the 19th century, people began to look for a new location. The choice fell on building a new military academy in Mödling. On the northern slope of the Eichkogel, 18 hectares of a pasture was purchased by the Reich Ministry of War for four million crowns from the city of Mödling in 1896. This sum was to be paid off in installments over the next 54.5 years, but the last installment was due to the collapse of Austria-Hungary as early as 1918. Despite the lack of installment payments, the city of Mödling benefited from the construction of the academy, as its popularity increased enormously and the economy also benefited from the frequent visitors.

In 1901, the construction of the main building and the other 25 individual buildings began according to the plans of the military chief engineer Paul Acham, which was completed in 1904 and opened on 4 November 1904 by Emperor Franz Joseph. Up to 370 students could live and be taught in the academy at this time. In addition, there was an almost self-sufficient infrastructure. In addition to the facilities required for military operations such as stables and parade grounds, there was also a gardening shop, a butcher's shop, a sick and isolation pavilion, several libraries, a swimming pool, a hairdresser's room, etc.

With the dissolution of Austria-Hungary and after only 14 years of study at the Mödling site, the Imperial and Royal Technical Military Academy ceased operations on 12 November 1918 with the proclamation of the Republic of German-Austria.

== Military significance ==
Those who attended the Technical Military Academy in Mödling (1904 to 1918) were recruited from graduates from military high schools or civilian high school graduates. The curriculum of the three-year training differed from the Theresian Military Academy in Wiener Neustadt in that artillery, technical weapons training and military construction were given much greater weight. Of the graduates from the Technical Military Academy who had been retired as lieutenants, 30 went to the artillery each year, while 25 were transferred to the engineer, railroad and telegraph regiments.

The Technical Military Academy also organized the "higher artillery course" for officers at regular intervals, in which the future members of the artillery staff (from 1896 "officers in special use of artillery") were trained. The successful graduates of this two-year course were deployed as specialists in the higher command and authorities of the army and were also able to advance to artillery engineers. In peacetime the "officers in special use of the artillery" were responsible for the uniformity of the training of the artillery and supervised the service in the artillery production facilities.

== Notable graduates ==
Among the graduates of the Technical Military Academy were

- Franz von Lauer, French Revolutionary Wars general
- Johann Heinrich von Schmitt, French Revolutionary and Napoleonic Wars general
- Franz von Weyrother, French Revolutionary and Napoleonic Wars general
- Johann Gabriel Chasteler de Courcelles, French Revolutionary and Napoleonic Wars general
- Frederick Bianchi, Duke of Casalanza, Napoleonic Wars general
- Alexander von Krobatin, later field marshal and war minister
- Hermann Kövess von Kövessháza, later field marshal and last commander-in-chief of the Austro-Hungarian Army
- Paul Puhallo von Brlog, later colonel general
- Theodor Körner, later President of Austria
- Richard Körner, later a lieutenant colonel specializing in artillery
- József Heszlényi, later Colonel General of the Hungarian Armed Forces
- Tadeusz Kutrzeba, Polish general
- Gustav von Myrdacz, Albanian general
- Moritz Erwin von Lemagh, major general
- Godwin von Brumowski, fighter ace
- Józef Pomiankowski, Austrian and Polish general
- Herman Potočnik, space theorist
- Otakar Borůvka, mathematician
- Roland Weitzenböck, mathematician
- Arthur Porr, civil engineer and concrete-based construction inventor

== Bibliography ==
- Hochedlinger, Michael. Austria's Wars of Emergence: War, State and Society in the Habsburg Monarchy, 1683–1797. Pearson Education Limited, 2003.

== See also ==
- Imperial and Royal Naval Academy
