= Intercell =

Defunct biotechnology company in Austria

Intercell AG
- Company type: Aktiengesellschaft
- Traded as: WBAG: ICLL; OTCQX: INRLY
- Industry: Biotechnology
- Founded: 1998
- Defunct: 2013
- Fate: Merged with Vivalis SA
- Successor: Valneva SE
- Headquarters: Vienna, Austria
- Key people: Thomas Lingelbach (CEO), Michel Gréco (Chairman of the supervisory board)
- Products: Development of vaccines
- Revenue: €34.2 million (2010)
- Operating income: ▼ (€251.2 million) (2010)
- Net income: ▼ (€255.2 million) (2010)
- Total assets: €225.2 million (end 2010)
- Total equity: €121.1 million (end 2010)
- Number of employees: 410 (average, 2010)
- Website: www.intercell.com

Intercell AG was a biotechnology company based in Vienna which focused on the development of modern prophylactic and therapeutic vaccines against infectious diseases. The company merged with Vivalis to form Valneva SE in 2012. Intercell was formed in 1998 as a spin-off of the Research Institute of Molecular Pathology (IMP) in Vienna. It employs 400 people in Austria, Scotland and the United States.

== History ==
It was founded in 1998 and focused on the research, development, and commercialization of vaccines and other biological products. Intercell AG's products were used to prevent and treat a variety of infectious diseases, including hepatitis B, Japanese encephalitis, and pneumonia. In 2012, Intercell AG merged with Vivalis SE, a French biotech company, to form Valneva.

It has been listed on the Vienna Stock Exchange since February 28, 2005. In 2008, Intercell signaled its intent to acquire Maryland-based Iomai, a developer of needle-free vaccination technology.

Intercell cooperates with pharmaceutical companies like Novartis, Merck and Sanofi-Aventis on vaccine production.

The most important projects of Intercell are:

- Vaccine against Japanese encephalitis (approved in Europe, America and Australia)
- Therapeutic vaccine against hepatitis C (in clinical phase II)
- Antigen identification program and adjuvant technologies.
- Vaccine Enhancement Patch to improve prevention against pandemic influenza (in collaboration with U.S. Department of Health and Human Services, in clinical phase II)
