= Primoco UAV =

Unmanned aerial vehicle for civil and military use

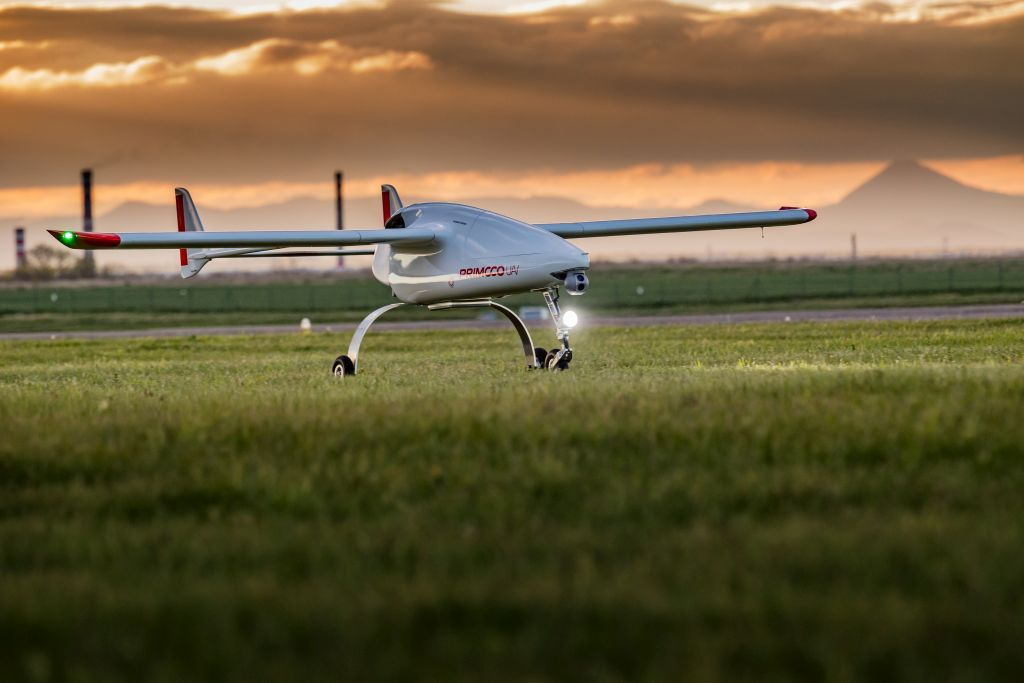

General information
- Type: Unmanned aerial vehicle
- National origin: Czech Republic
- Manufacturer: Primoco UAV SE
- Status: In service
- Number built: Over 250 (as of 2026)

History
- First flight: July 31, 2015 (One 100 prototype)

Primoco UAV is a range of unmanned aircraft made by the Czech company Primoco UAV SE for civilian and military operators. Their roles include reconnaissance, surveillance of borders and coastlines, inspections of infrastructure and checks of airport navigation aids.

The One 150 has fixed wings, a composite airframe and twin tail booms. An engine at the rear drives a pusher propeller. The aircraft takes off and lands on a runway. A pilot and a sensor operator work from a ground station. The aircraft can fly a programmed route and take off and land automatically. Its payload varies by mission and can include cameras and other sensors.

Developed after the One 100, the One 150 has a more powerful engine. The military One 150M received a military type certificate for special purposes under NATO standard in March 2025. Primoco also has approval for civil flights at SAIL III through its light UAS operator certificate. Reports described the two approvals as a world first in the aircraft’s category.

== Development ==
The Primoco One 100 prototype first flew at Tchořovice airfield in South Bohemia on 31 July 2015. Production began in January 2016.

For the subsequent One 150, Primoco needed a more powerful engine than the 20 hp unit fitted to the One 100. In 2017, it announced the Primoco 500, a four-cylinder, 50 hp piston engine developed for the aircraft.

The One 150M, a military version of the One 150, first flew at Písek-Krašovice airfield on 30 September 2021. The flight was the first in a series of tests for certification under NATO standard STANAG 4703. This version incorporated modifications required for certification.

In February 2022, the Czech Civil Aviation Authority granted Primoco a light UAS operator certificate (LUC), allowing the company to authorise flights within the scope of its approval.

On 11 March 2025, the Czech Ministry of Defence’s Military Aviation Oversight Division issued a military type certificate for special purposes for the One 150M. Flight-control supplier UAV Navigation described the combination of STANAG 4703 certification and Primoco's LUC operating privileges at SAIL III as a first in the aircraft's category.

== Design ==
The One 150 is a fixed-wing aircraft with a composite airframe, twin tail booms and fixed tricycle landing gear. It takes off and lands on a runway. The engine is mounted at the rear of the fuselage and drives a pusher propeller. Later aircraft use the Primoco 340, a 340 cm³ four-cylinder, four-stroke petrol engine.

The ground control station has two crew members: a pilot and a sensor operator. It can be fitted in a vehicle or used as a separate unit. The pilot can control the aircraft manually or programme a flight, from take-off to landing. If the radio link fails or a malfunction occurs, the aircraft can return to base or land in a designated area.

An encrypted radio link carries control commands, flight data and sensor imagery between the aircraft and the ground station over distances of up to 200 km. The aircraft is equipped with a Mode S transponder. ADS-B equipment allows it to broadcast its position and provides the ground crew with the positions and identities of other suitably equipped aircraft.

=== Equipment ===
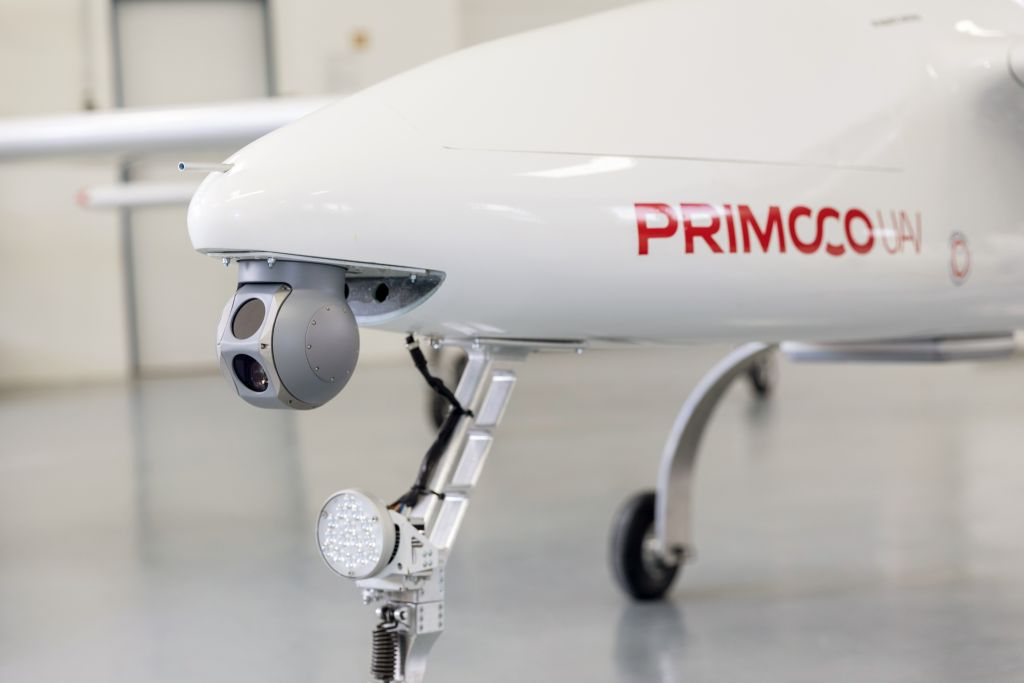
Primoco UAV and DST OTUS U135 camera

The One 150 has payload mounting positions in its nose, central fuselage and on the sides of the fuselage. Depending on the mission, it can carry:

- Daylight and thermal-imaging cameras
- Multispectral sensors
- Lidar
- Synthetic-aperture radar

The aircraft can also carry equipment for inspecting and calibrating airport navigation aids, including instrument landing systems and VOR, DME and NDB transmitters.

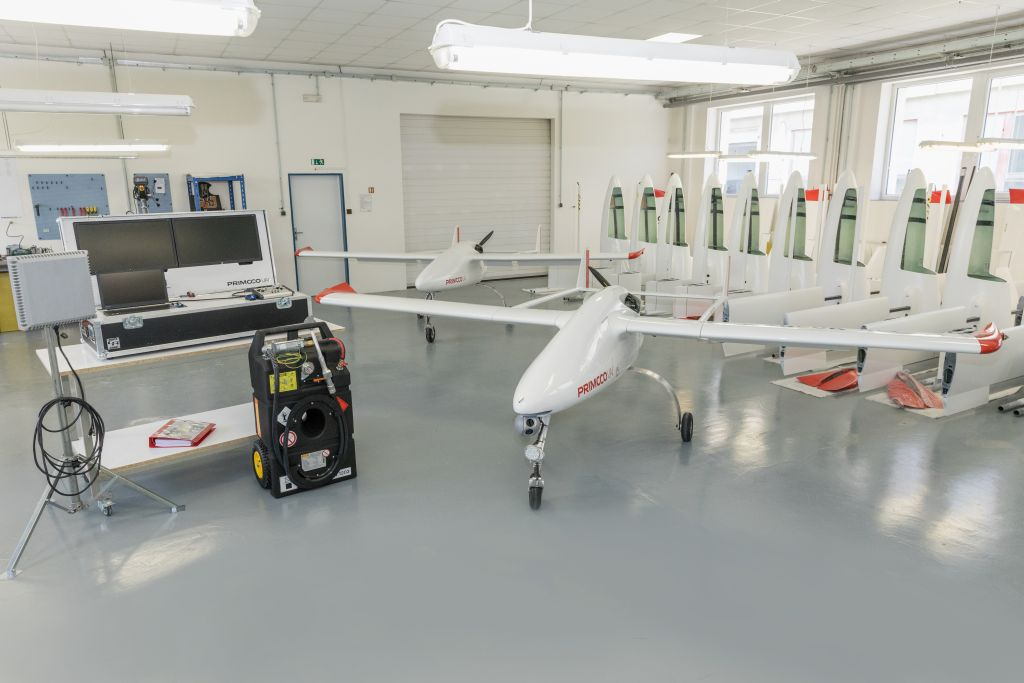
Primoco UAV and ground control station

== Manufacturer ==
Ladislav Semetkovský and Gabriel Fülöpp founded Primoco UAV SE in 2015. The company’s aircraft were developed and built in Radotín, a district of Prague.

Primoco raised about CZK 63 million when it joined the Prague Stock Exchange’s START market in October 2018. It raised another CZK 90.5 million by issuing new shares in May 2021. The shares moved to the exchange’s Prime Market on 29 January 2024.

== Production and training facilities ==
Primoco builds its aircraft in Radotín, Prague. Its management moved to offices in Modřany in the first half of 2026, leaving the Radotín factory for manufacturing.

The company owns Písek-Krašovice airfield, where it develops and tests aircraft and trains crews. A training centre opened there on 16 June 2026 for pilots and operators from military, police, emergency-service and civilian organisations.

In April 2026, Primoco obtained a building permit for a new factory in an industrial zone near Písek-Krašovice airfield. The planned facility would replace its Radotín production premises and have capacity for 300 aircraft a year.

== Specifications (One 150) ==
Data from Uncrewed Systems Technology

General characteristics

- Capacity: Up to 30 kg (66 lb) payload
- Length: 3.65 m (12 ft 0 in)
- Wingspan: 4.85 m (15 ft 11 in)
- Height: 1.25 m (4 ft 1 in)
- Max takeoff weight: 150 kg (331 lb)
- Powerplant: 1 × Primoco 340 four-cylinder, four-stroke petrol engine, 18.6 kW (24.9 hp)

Performance

- Endurance: Up to 15 hours
- Cruising speed: 100 to 150 km/h (54 to 81 kn; 62 to 93 mph)
- Maximum flight distance: 2,000 km (1,100 nmi; 1,200 mi)
- Maximum altitude: 3,300 m (10,800 ft)

== Operators and orders ==
- Germany
  - BioConsult SH – acquired 2 One 150 aircraft for ecological research and monitoring
- Malaysia
  - GIAAN Group – ordered 2 One 150 aircraft in 2023 as part of a system for inspecting and calibrating airport navigation equipment
- Spain
  - Guardia Civil – received One 150 aircraft on 27 March 2026 under a €4 million contract for border and maritime surveillance
- Ukraine – at least 45 aircraft supplied as military aid:
  - 27 supplied through Luxembourg and Benelux cooperation
  - 18 supplied by Germany, according to its list of completed military-aid deliveries
