= Arthur Porr =

- Born: 11 June 1872; Berehove
- Died: 17 October 1915 (aged 43); Vienna
- Years active: 1897 - 1914
- Known for: Construction company Porr

Arthur Porr (born 11 June 1872, in Berehove; died 17 October 1915 in Vienna) was an Austrian building contractor and inventor of various techniques for concrete-based construction.

The son of a Transylvanian wood trader graduated from the Militäroberrealschule (military secondary school) in Mährisch Weißkirchen and the engineering department of the Imperial and Royal Technical Military Academy in Vienna. He was made second lieutenant in the Railway and Telegraph Regiment in 1893 and was promoted to first lieutenant in 1897. In the same year he resigned from the military service and then worked for various construction companies in the development of reinforced concrete construction. At the beginning of the 20th century, the inventions of civil engineers helped the concrete building method to break through. This technology secured the leading position for the company A. Porr Concrete Construction GmbH founded in 1908 with O. Stern, whose CEO Arthur Porr was until 1914. The merger with the Allgemeinen österreichischen Baugesellschaft created in 1927 the Allgemeine Baugesellschaft - A. Porr AG, today Porr AG.

== Literature ==
- H. Reitterer: "Porr Arthur". In: Österreichisches Biographisches Lexikon 1815–1950 (ÖBL). Vol. 8, Austrian Academy of Sciences, Vienna 1983, ISBN 3-7001-0187-2, p. 210.
