= Palais Caprara-Geymüller =

Palace housing the Vienna Stock Exchange

Coordinates: 48°12′37″N 16°21′57″E

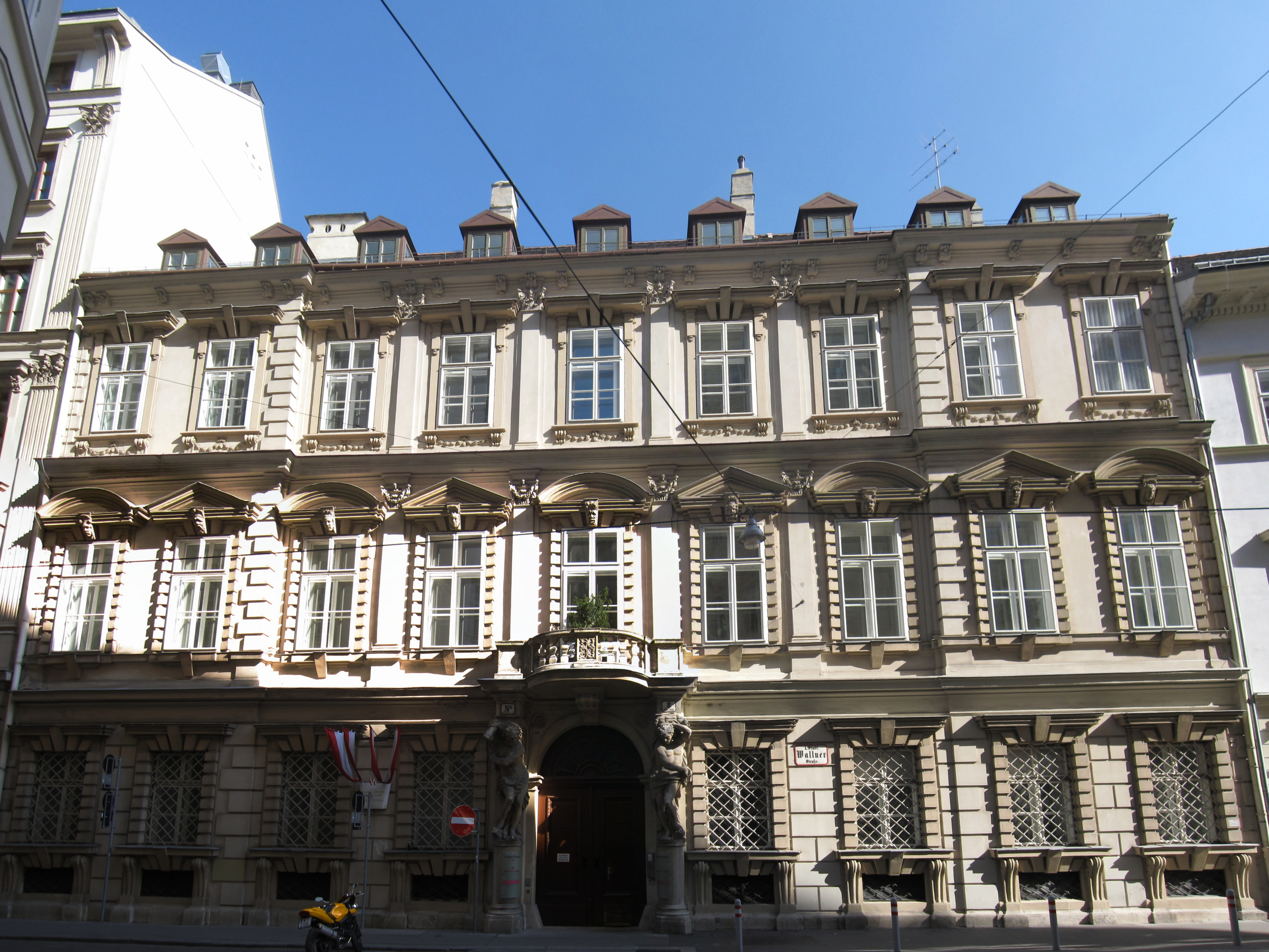
Palais Caprara-Geymüller.

Palais Caprara-Geymüller, sometimes known as Palais Caprara, is a Baroque palace in Vienna, Austria. The Vienna Stock Exchange is situated in the palace.

== Architecture ==
The Viennese initially disliked it since the Palais Caprara-Geymüller had a rather atypical design for baroque Vienna. Still, they were soon impressed by the massive building that blended into the cityscape without any problems. The facade consists of a five-axis central projection and a two-axis side projection. Ledges above the floors structure the horizontal façade. In addition, the windows on the first floor are decorated alternately with triangular gables and round arches. The strict structure of the floors is representative of the Italian palace architecture. The entrance gate is bordered by two atlases which support the balcony above. The entrance hall is a transverse, a wide columned hall, from which a three-armed staircase leads to the first floor. The walls of the now subdivided ballroom, which used to extend the entire building length, were almost completely covered with architectural paintings that only came to light after a restoration. Only two rooms of the high-quality Empire furnishings have been preserved: The Geymüller Salon and the Pompeian Room, now used as the Wien Museum.

== Sources ==
- W.Kraus, P.Müller: Wiener Palais, 1991
- Bruno Grimschitz: Wiener Barockpaläste, 1944
