= CA Immo =

Austrian real estate company

- Company type: Aktiengesellschaft
- Traded as: WBAG: CAI; ATX Index component
- ISIN: AT0000641352
- Founded: 1987
- Headquarters: Vienna, Austria
- Key people: Keegan Viscius (CEO); Andreas Schillhofer (CFO); Thorsten Hollstein (Board)
- Products: Real estate
- Revenue: € 230.9 million - Rental income (2025)
- Number of employees: 241 (31.12.2025)
- Website: https://www.caimmo.com/en/

CA Immo or CA Immobilien Anlagen AG is an Austrian real estate company based in Vienna with offices in Germany (Berlin, Frankfurt and Munich), and the respective capitals of Poland, Hungary and the Czech Republic. CA Immo's core competence is the development and management of office properties in core Europe. In addition to managing existing properties, CA Immo in Germany focuses on the development and realisation of new properties. As of March 2011, it is a member of the Austrian Traded Index (ATX), the index of the twenty largest companies traded on the Vienna Stock Exchange.

== Management ==
Keegan Viscius joined the Management Board of CA Immo as Chief Investment Officer per 1. November 2018 and per 10. June 2023 as Chief Executive Officer and is responsible for Investment & Asset Management, Development, Corporate Communications & Sustainability, Market Research & Data Analysis as well as Administration and IT.

Andreas Schillhofer was appointed to the Management Board of CA Immo as Chief Financial Officer on 1 June 2019 and is responsible for Accounting & Taxes, Controlling, Financing, Property Valuation, Capital Markets & Investor Relations, Corporate Office (incl. Compliance and Organisation) and Legal.

Corporate Strategy, Risk Management, Internal Audit and Human Resources are the joint responsibility of Keegan Viscius and Andreas Schillhofer.

== History ==
CA Immo was founded in 1987 as part of Creditanstalt-Bankverein, an Austrian commercial bank and has been listed on the Vienna Stock Exchange [HC1] since 1988; since April 2007, CA Immo shares have been traded on the Prime Market.

With a stake of around 66% of the share capital, SOF-11 Klimt CAI S.à. r.l., Luxembourg, a company managed by Starwood Capital Group, is the Company's largest shareholder. The remaining approximately 34% of the shares are in free float or held by the company itself as treasury shares (as of July 2025).

In 2008, CA Immo acquired the German Vivico Real Estate GmbH, a subsidiary of Deutsche Bahn, including all non-operational land and brownfield sites of Deutsche Bahn as well as the branches in Munich, Berlin and Frankfurt, as part of its expansion plans in Germany. Since 2008, CA Immo has been one of the most active office developers in Germany

At the beginning of 2011, CA Immo acquired the property subsidiary of the Österreichischen Volksbanken Gruppe (ÖVAG) and thereby significantly expanded its portfolio in Eastern Europe.

The company employs about 240 people in Austria, Germany and Eastern Europe (as of 31 December 2025).

A longstanding goal of CA Immo was to merge with or take over its fellow ATX member Immofinanz. Merger negotiations failed in 2014, as did a takeover bid by CA Immo in spring 2015. In August 2016, CA Immo's then core shareholder O1 Group, controlled by Russian real estate billionaire Boris Mints and his son Dmitry Mints, sold its 26% stake in CA Immo to Austrian real estate investor Immofinanz, whose goal was also to merge the two companies. After this plan failed, Immofinanz sold its stake in CA Immo to Starwood Group at the end of September 2018.
