= FACC AG =

Austrian aerospace company

- Formerly: Fischer Advanced Composite Components
- Type: Aktiengesellschaft
- Traded as: WBAG: FACC
- ISIN: AT00000FACC2
- Industry: Aerospace engineering
- Founded: 1989 in Ried im Innkreis, Upper Austria
- Headquarters: Ried im Innkreis, Austria
- Area served: Worldwide
- Key people: Robert Machtlinger (CEO); Florian Heindl (CFO); Tongyu Xu (CSO)
- Services: Development, design and production of aerospace technology, composite components and systems
- Net income: ▲€984.405 million (2025)
- Number of employees: ▲4,017 (2026)
- Parent: Aviation Industry Corporation of China
- Website: facc.com

FACC AG (formerly Fischer Advanced Composite Components) is an Austrian company with a Chinese core shareholder. The company is headquartered in the town of Ried im Innkreis in Upper Austria.

== Industry and production ==
FACC is an aerospace company that designs, develops, and produces aerospace technologies and lightweight aircraft systems. Operating as a supplier to the global aerospace industry, the company develops system solutions and manufactures structural elements such as wings, tail assemblies, fuselages, engine parts, cowlings, and interior components for passenger aircraft. FACC collaborates with major aircraft manufacturers to develop new aviation technologies. Its operations are divided into three divisions, supported by an Aftermarket Service business unit that provides maintenance and repair services across all departments.

- Division Aerostructures: lightweight components for an aircraft's fuselage, wings, and tail assembly
- Division Engines & Nacelles: engine parts and fairings
- Division Cabin Interiors: complete interior fittings ("floor to floor") such as luggage racks, ceiling panels and on-board toilets
- The Aftermarket Services includes maintenance, repair and development services, as well as modifications for all structural and interior components.

Users of FACC's products and services include all leading aircraft and engine manufacturers and their first-class suppliers, for example Airbus, Boeing, Bombardier, Comac, Embraer, Pratt & Whitney, Rolls-Royce, Airbus Helicopters, Aviation Partners, Dassault, Diehl, Engine Alliance, Gulfstream, Hawker Beechcraft, Safran, Collins Aerospace and others. FACC's most important export markets are Germany, France, Canada, United Kingdom, US, Brazil and China.

In 2025, FACC achieved record revenue growth of 11.3%, reaching EUR 984.4 million. This strong performance was also reflected in the operating result (EBIT), which increased to EUR 42.3 million.

== Locations and employees ==
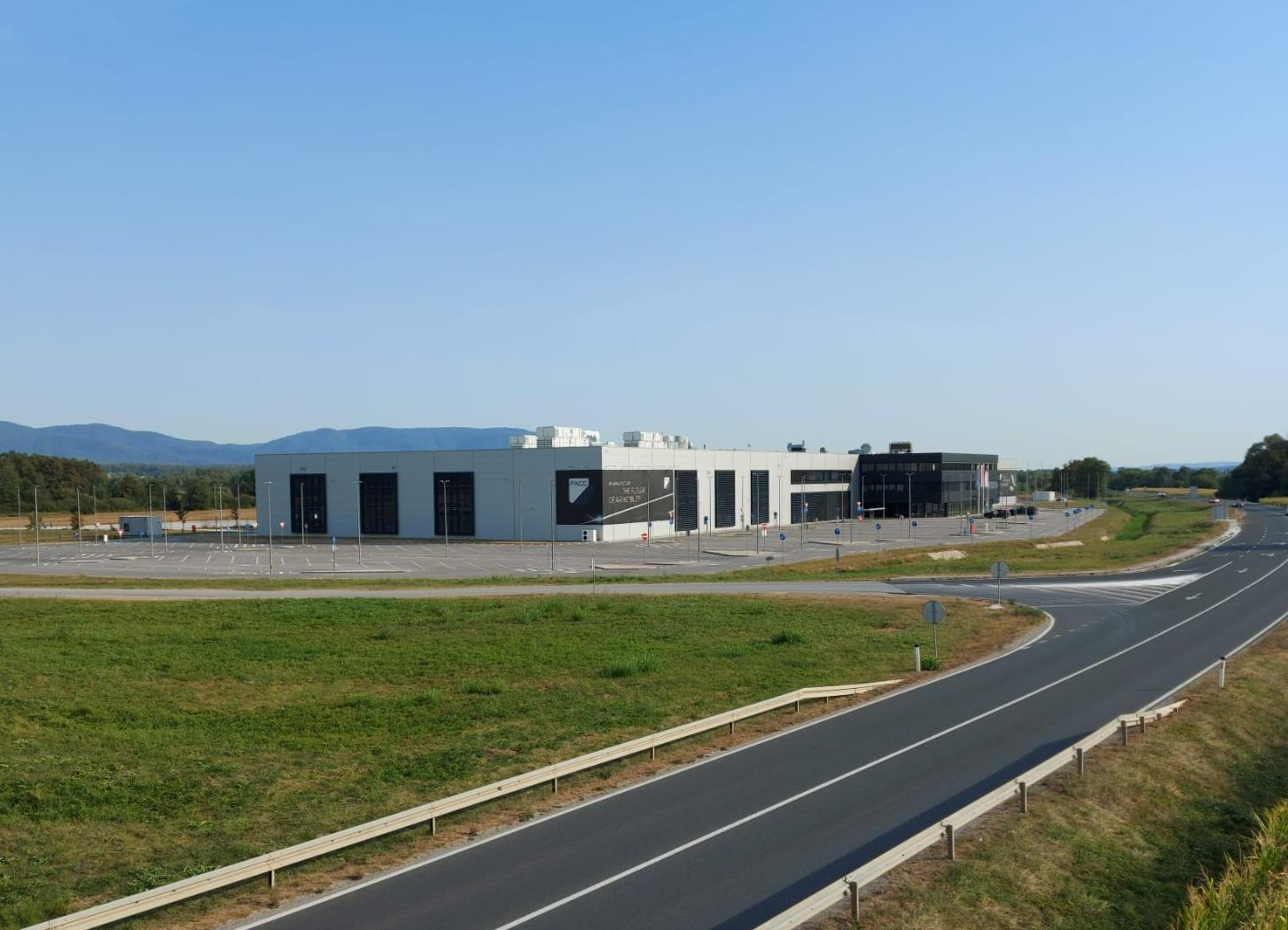
FACC's production facility in Jakovlje (FACC Solutions Croatia d.o.o.), which was awarded the internal FACC "Leonardo" award in 2025 as one of the most successful international business subsidiaries.

FACC has four production facilities in Austria: the main facility (German: Werk 1) in Ried im Innkreis, two in St. Martin im Innkreis, and one in Reichersberg – all in the district of Ried im Innkreis in western Upper Austria. The technology center in St. Martin im Innkreis was opened in September 2013, and in the fiscal year 2021, the CoLT test center became a wholly-owned subsidiary of FACC.

Other subsidiaries and cooperation partners are located in Vienna, Jakovlje (Croatia), Bratislava (Slovakia), Montreal (Canada), Seattle and Wichita (US), Melbourne (Florida), São Paulo (Brazil), Toulouse (France), Filton (England), Hamburg (Germany), Abu Dhabi (United Arab Emirates), Pune and Bangaluru (India), Kuala Lumpur (Malaysia), Zhenjiang and Shanghai (China).

FACC employs approximately 4,000 employees from 52 countries at 15 locations around the world.

== Awards and recognitions ==
FACC AG has received multiple corporate, industry and supplier awards for its aerospace manufacturing excellence, innovations in lightweight systems and financial transparency:

- 2019: Airbus Innovation Award for outstanding innovation in the development of a key component for the “Airbus Wing of Tomorrow” project;
- 2020: Rolls-Royce – Best Practice Award for the excellent performance and quality of the long-standing partnership;
- 2020: Gold Innovation Award of the State of Upper Austria in the category Large Enterprises for the Urban Air Mobility project;
- 2020/21: The business magazine "Trend" and the Austrian Association for Consumer Studies (ÖGVS) – Innovation Award for outstanding innovative strength;
- 2020/21: Embraer – Supplier of the Year Award in the Programme development category for the excellent performance in the development and production of high-tech components for the E-Jet E2 family;
- 2024: Advantage Austria – The Silver Export Prize in the trade and craft category for international excellence;
- 2024 – 2026: Embraer – Best Supplier of the Year Award in the Aerostructures category for exceptional operational performance;
- 2025: Aero Excellence Award in bronze for its plant in Reichersberg (Austria), validating high international manufacturing standards and supply chain efficiency;
- 2026: Vienna Stock Exchange Award – 3rd place in the "Mid Cap" category for financial communication, transparency and sustainable growth;
- 2026: Upper Austria Pegasus Business Award – Pegasus in Gold in the "Lighthouses" category.
