= Markus Schafferer =

Austrian entrepreneur and investor (b. 1978)

- Born: April 5, 1978 (age 48)
- Education: University of Innsbruck
- Occupations: Entrepreneur, Investor
- Known for: Founder of PEMA Immobilien GmbH

Markus Schafferer (born April 5, 1978) is an Austrian entrepreneur and real estate investor.

== Personal life ==
Schafferer finished his Matura at the Reithmannstraße secondary school and moved on to study law at the University of Innsbruck. During that time, he worked as an art dealer and developed business relations and friendships with wealthy families from Tirol. Those contacts helped him to get into the real estate business. Schafferer is married and has a son and a daughter.

According to the trend magazine, Schafferer is one of the 100 richest people in Austria.

== Career ==
He founded the PEMA Immobilien GmbH in 2005 and acquired as his first big project, the Brenner Outlet Center together with the Huter Family. His company realized three towers in Innsbruck named, the Headline, P2 and P3, the latter of which is still under construction.

Since the founding of PEMA, Schafferer has been involved in several major real estate projects, such as the old Creditanstalt-Bankverein building at the Schottenring in Vienna. Due to this, he was consulted several times by the media as a real estate expert to talk about topics such as the housing situation in Vienna and Innsbruck.

Under his leadership, PEMA has developed real estate projects with a total volume of more than 750 million euros in Austria, Germany and South Tyrol since its foundation in 2005.

== Philanthropy ==
Schafferer is regarded as the sponsor and jury member of the apti Award, which honours start-ups in the real estate industry. In 2017, he also supported the Austria Pavilion at the Venice Biennale.

== See also ==
- Real estate entrepreneur
