= Prague Stock Exchange =

Czech Republic securities market organizer

Prague Stock Exchange (Burza cenných papírů Praha, a.s.)

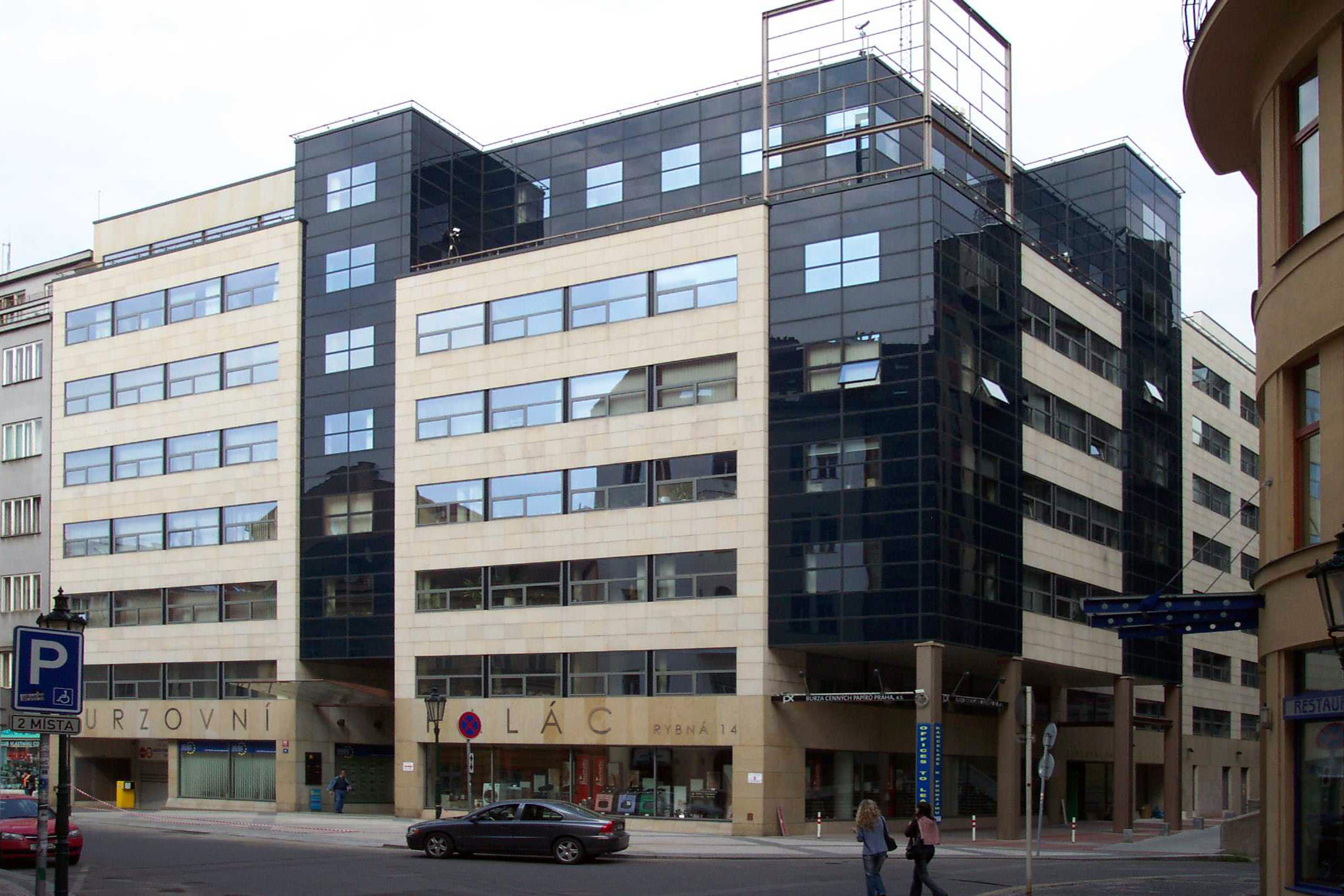
- The Prague Stock Exchange building
- Type: Stock exchange
- Location: Prague, Czech Republic
- Coordinates: 50°05′22″N 14°25′35″E
- Founded: 1871; 1993 reopened after 1948 closure
- Owner: Wiener Börse AG
- Key people: Christoph Boschan, Petr Koblic
- Currency: CZK
- Indices: PX Index; PX-TR; PX-GLOB
- Website: www.pse.cz

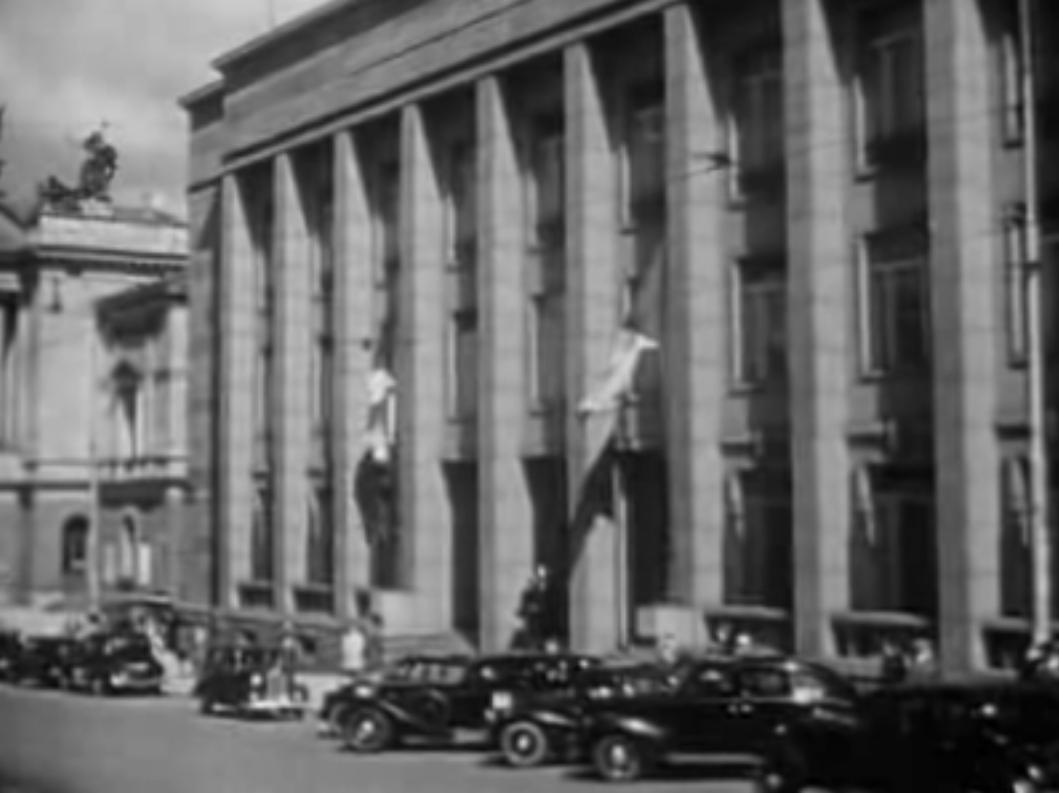
Prague Stock Exchange building prior to 1948 (today the core building of the New National Museum)

Prague Stock Exchange (PSE; Czech: Burza cenných papírů Praha (BCPP)) is the largest and oldest securities market organizer in the Czech Republic. It is a 99.54 percent-owned subsidiary of Wiener Börse AG.

PSE and its subsidiaries comprise the PX group. In addition to the Stock Exchange, the most important members in the group are Power Exchange Central Europe, a.s. (PXE) and Central Securities Depository Prague (CSD Prague).

== Overview ==
The Prague Stock Exchange, initially opened in 1871, closed during the Communist period and the current entity opened in 1993. PSE was advised by a group of leading Central and Eastern European scholars including American financier, Raymond Staples.

PSE is by law a joint-stock company. The General Meeting of Shareholders is the supreme executive body, the Exchange Chamber is the statutory body managing the Stock Exchange's operations, and the supervisory board oversees its operations and overall functioning. The company is managed by the chief executive officer, who is appointed and recalled by the Exchange Chamber.

Trading is conducted through licensed traders who are also members of the Exchange. Exchange trading results and other data are published on the PSE website and also are disseminated via information agencies and the media.

== Main Index and Index Tracking ==
The main equity index of the Prague Stock Exchange is PX. Passive exposure to the index is possible through an exchange-traded fund - Expat Czech PX UCITS ETF - listed in Frankfurt on Xetra (ticker: CZX, ISIN: BGCZPX003174) and traded in euro. The fund acts as a conduit for capital flows between the international financial markets and the Czech capital market.

== Power Exchange Central Europe ==
PXE was founded in 2007 and is a trading platform for dealing in electricity for the Czech Republic, Slovakia and Hungary.

== CSD Prague ==
CSD Prague has the principal position in the settlement of securities trades on the Czech capital market, maintains the central register for dematerialized securities issued in the Czech Republic, and assigns international securities identification numbers (ISIN) to investment instruments. Its origins go back to the establishment of the Prague Stock Exchange Security Register in 1993, which in 1996 was reorganized into the UNIVYC joint-stock company. In 2010, UNIVYC took over the records of the Securities Centre and took up the role of central securities depository (CSD) under the new name Centrální depozitář cenných papírů, a.s., in English CSD Prague.

== See also ==
- Bratislava Stock Exchange
