= Wiener Börse =

Stock exchange located in Vienna, Austria

Wiener Börse AG
- Type: Stock exchange
- Location: Vienna, Austria
- Coordinates: 48°12′54″N 16°22′00″E
- Founded: 1771; 255 years ago
- Key people: Christoph Boschan; Andrea Herrmann; Petr Koblic
- No. of listings: 1090 shares; 48073 bonds; 1404 warrants; 6640 certificates; 384 ETFs
- Market cap: €209.86 billion (June 2026)
- Volume: €11.17 billion (equity, June 2026)
- Indices: Austrian Traded Index (ATX)
- Website: www.wienerborse.at/en/

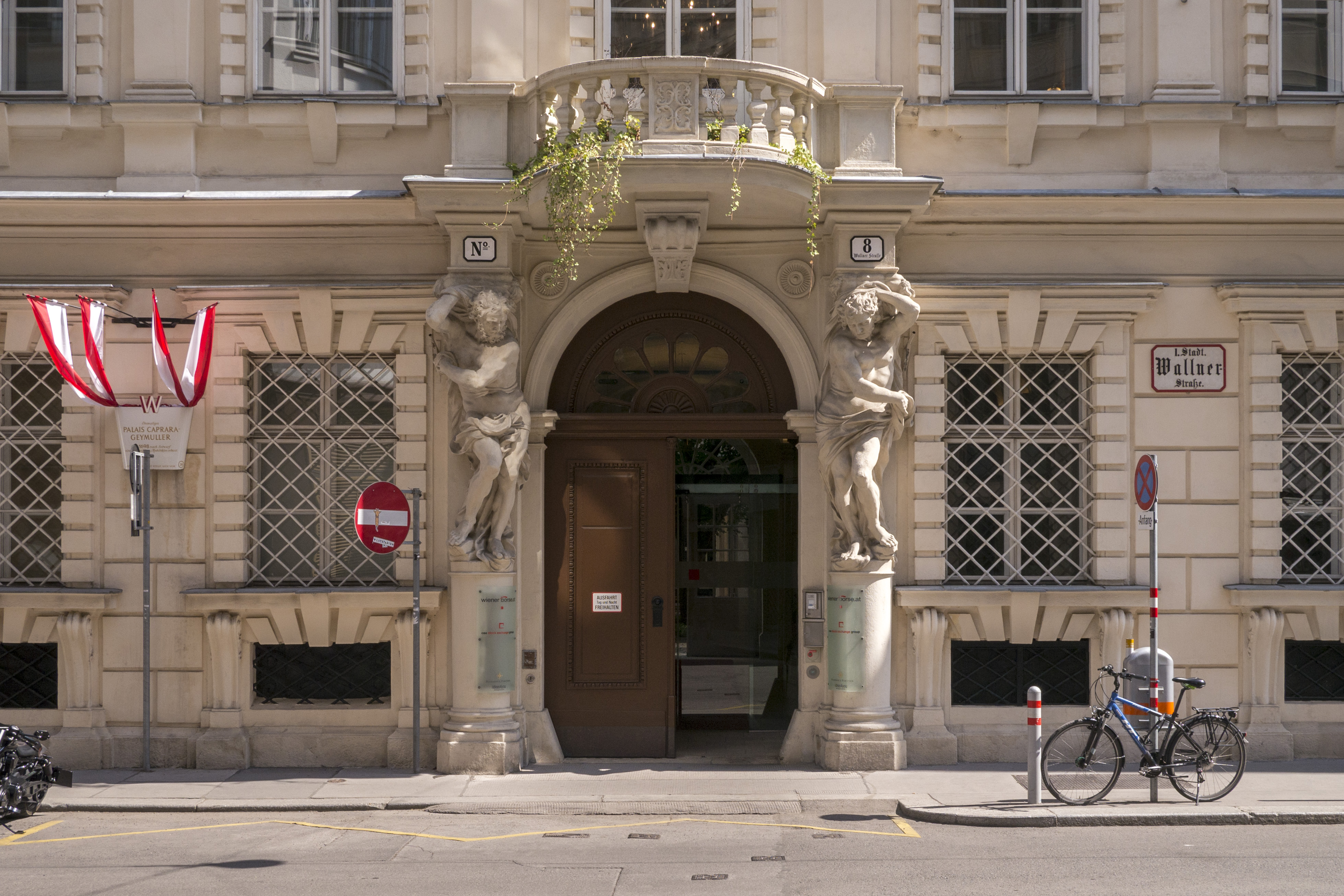
Palais Caprara-Geymüller, the current home of the Wiener Börse

The Wiener Börse AG (also known as the Vienna Stock Exchange) is a bourse situated in Vienna, Austria. The exchange owns and operates the Prague Stock Exchange, and holds stakes in energy exchanges and clearing houses. It provides market infrastructure to other exchanges in Central, Eastern, and Southeastern Europe (Budapest, Zagreb, and Ljubljana), and collects and distributes stock market data and calculates the most important indices of the region. The Austrian Traded Index (ATX), the leading index of Wiener Börse, tracks the price of its blue chips in real time. The ATX composition is updated every March and September, mainly based on a stock's capitalized free float and trading volumes. The Vienna Stock Exchange also maintains a market for fixed income securities, with more than 13,000 active bonds from 38 countries and a total volume of €720bn as at May 2023.

== Market structure ==
The Vienna Stock Exchange operates two markets: the Official Market and the Vienna MTF, a multilateral trading facility. The Official Market is the main regulated market operated by the Vienna Stock Exchange.

An issuer listing securities in the Official Market must adhere to the requirements of the Austrian Stock Exchange Act. The listing application must be submitted in writing and also must also be signed by one member of the Vienna Stock Exchange. The application must include an excerpt not older than four weeks from the Austrian Business Register or equivalent in the case of a foreign issuer, a listing prospectus drawn in line with EU prospectus regulations, a current version of the issuer's articles of association or equivalent and at least one set of current audited financial statements.

The requirements of the Austrian Stock Exchange Act regarding the listing of securities in the Official Market and the accompanying obligations of issuers do not apply to financial instruments included in trading in the Vienna MTF. As such, the Vienna MTF is customarily used by foreign issuers of corporate bonds, small and medium-sized enterprises (SME) issuing equity and expanding young companies. Although the requirements on issuers of securities traded in the Vienna MTF are lower, issuers still must comply with EU market abuse regulations, which were transposed into Austrian law through the Austrian Stock Exchange Act.

== History ==
Wiener Börse is one of the world's oldest exchanges and was founded in 1771 during the reign of Empress Maria Theresa of Austria in order to provide a market for state issued bonds. She tried to rein in the illegal trade that took place in coffeeshops during that time.

On 9 May 1873, the stock exchange crashed spectacularly ("Der Krach"), signalling the start of the Long Depression.

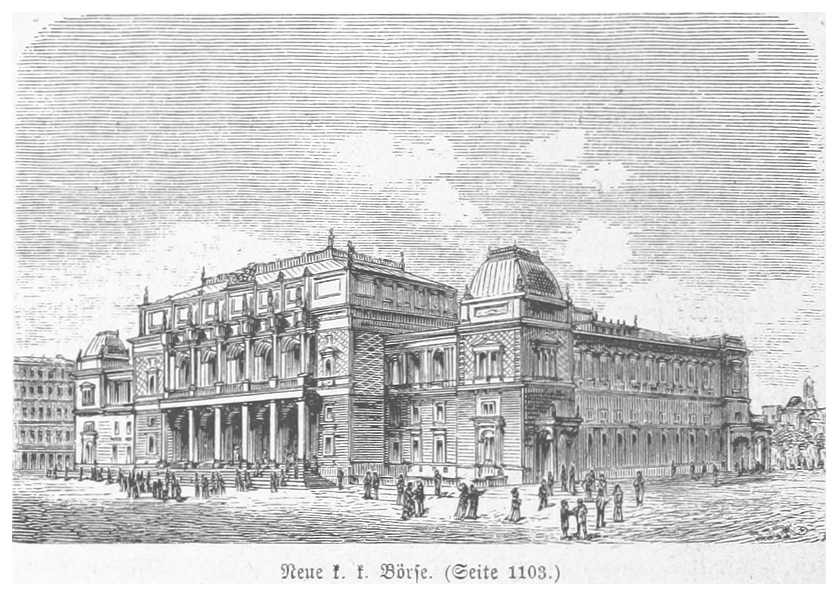

A new building for the stock exchange was commissioned as part of a broader effort to restore confidence. It was designed for a site on the Ringstrasse by Theophil Hansen, an architect of Danish origin.

In 1985, Jim Rogers triggered a bull market when he said the Austrian capital market had high potential. He has been notable for his contributions to the Austrian stock market.

Since November 1999, securities have been traded via the fully electronic trading system Xetra.

In 2001 the stock exchange moved to Palais Caprara-Geymüller.

In 2008, the Wiener Börse agreed to buy the Prague Stock Exchange for an undisclosed amount. In the same year, the börse bought an 81% stake in Ljubljana Stock Exchange (Ljubljanska borza). In 2010, ATVP, the Slovene market regulator restricted the Wiener Börse's voting rights. The rights would be restored only by either purchasing full ownership or no more than 25% stake. The case was taken to the Slovene Supreme Court which upheld the ATVP ruling. The Wiener Börse bought the remaining shares. In 2015, the Wiener Börse sold the Ljubljana Stock Exchange to the Zagreb Stock Exchange (Zagrebačka burza).

In 2019, it opened a multilateral trading facility (the exchange-regulated "Vienna MTF"), a third market for over-the-counter transactions.

In 2020, the Wiener Börse listed for the first time products denominated in the cryptocurrencies Bitcoin and Ethereum, making real-time prices available for trading between 9:15am and 5:30pm.

In 2023 the company formed EuroCTP as a joint venture with 13 other bourses, in an effort to provide a consolidated tape for the European Union, as part of the Capital Markets Union proposed by the European Commission.

== See also ==
- Austrian Traded Index (ATX)
- Prague Stock Exchange Index (PX)
- List of European stock exchanges
