= Graser (disambiguation) =

A graser or gamma-ray laser is a hypothetical device that would produce coherent gamma rays.

Graser may also refer to:

- Gräser or Graser, a surname
- a gravity laser
- Graser Nunatak, Palmer Land, Antarctica

== See also ==
- Gaser (disambiguation)
- Grasser
