= Grasser =

Grasser is a surname of German origin, meaning "to scream behave in a high-spirited way", referring to an irascible person or complainer. Notable people with the surname include:

- Anton Grasser (1891-1976), German general
- Elisabeth Grasser (1904-2002), Austrian fencer
- Erasmus Grasser (c. 1450-c. 1515), German master builder and sculptor
- Georg Grasser (born 1990), Austrian footballer
- Hartmann Grasser (1914-1986), German fighter ace
- Karl-Heinz Grasser (born 1969), Austrian former politician
- Tibor Grasser (born 1970), Austrian electrical engineer and professor

== See also ==
- Grasser Racing Team, an Austrian racing team
- Gräser
