= Gaser =

Gaser may refer to:

- Gåser, a village in the former municipality of Hals Municipality, Denmark
- a gravity laser

== See also ==
- Gasser (disambiguation)
- Geyser
- Graser (disambiguation)
