= Gasser =

Gasser can mean:

- Gasser (manga), a fictional character also known as Heppokomaru
- Gasser (car), a certain style of hot rod
- Hungarian or Montenegrin Gasser pistols, e.g.: Gasser M1870
- Someone who or something that gasses in its various meanings
  - e.g. see The Mad Gasser of Mattoon
- Someone with red hair or who has bleached and straightened his hair to an orange reddish tint using gasoline.
  - Used in the 1940 novel Native Son by Richard Wright and Durango Street (1976) by Frank Bonham

== People ==
- Adolf Gasser (1903–1985), Swiss historian
- Elsa Gasser (1896–1967), Polish-born Swiss economist
- Herbert Spencer Gasser (1888–1963), American physiologist
- Hans Gasser (1817–1868), Austrian painter and sculptor
- Johann Lorenz Gasser (1723–1765), Austrian anatomist
- Johannes Gasser (born 1991), Austrian politician
- Joseph Gasser von Valhorn (1816–1900), Austrian sculptor, brother of Hans
- Josh Gasser (born 1992), American basketball player
- Lorenzo D. Gasser (1876–1955), American Army officer
- Lucien Gasser (1897–1939), French World War I flying ace
- Mark Gasser (born 1972), British concert pianist
- Nolan Gasser (born 1964), American composer, pianist, musicologist
- Robert Gasser American baseball player
- Sandra Gasser (born 1962), retired Swiss track and field athlete
- Susan M. Gasser, Swiss biologist
