= Deutschmeister =

Deutschmeister may refer to:

- a high dignitary of the Teutonic Knights, Landmeister of the bailiwicks in the Holy Roman Empire, see Teutonic Order#Landmeister
- The 4th Infantry Regiment "Hoch- und Deutschmeister" of the Army of the Holy Roman Empire and subsequently Imperial-Royal (later Imperial and Royal) Army
- Die Deutschmeister, a 1955 film by Ernst Marischka starring Romy Schneider

== See also ==
- Deutschmeister-Palais
