= Theophil Hansen =

Danish-Austrian architect (1813–1891)

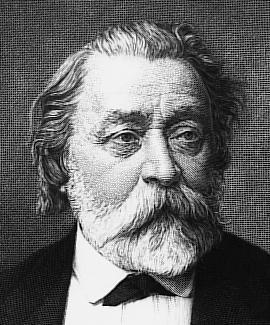
Baron Theophil von Hansen

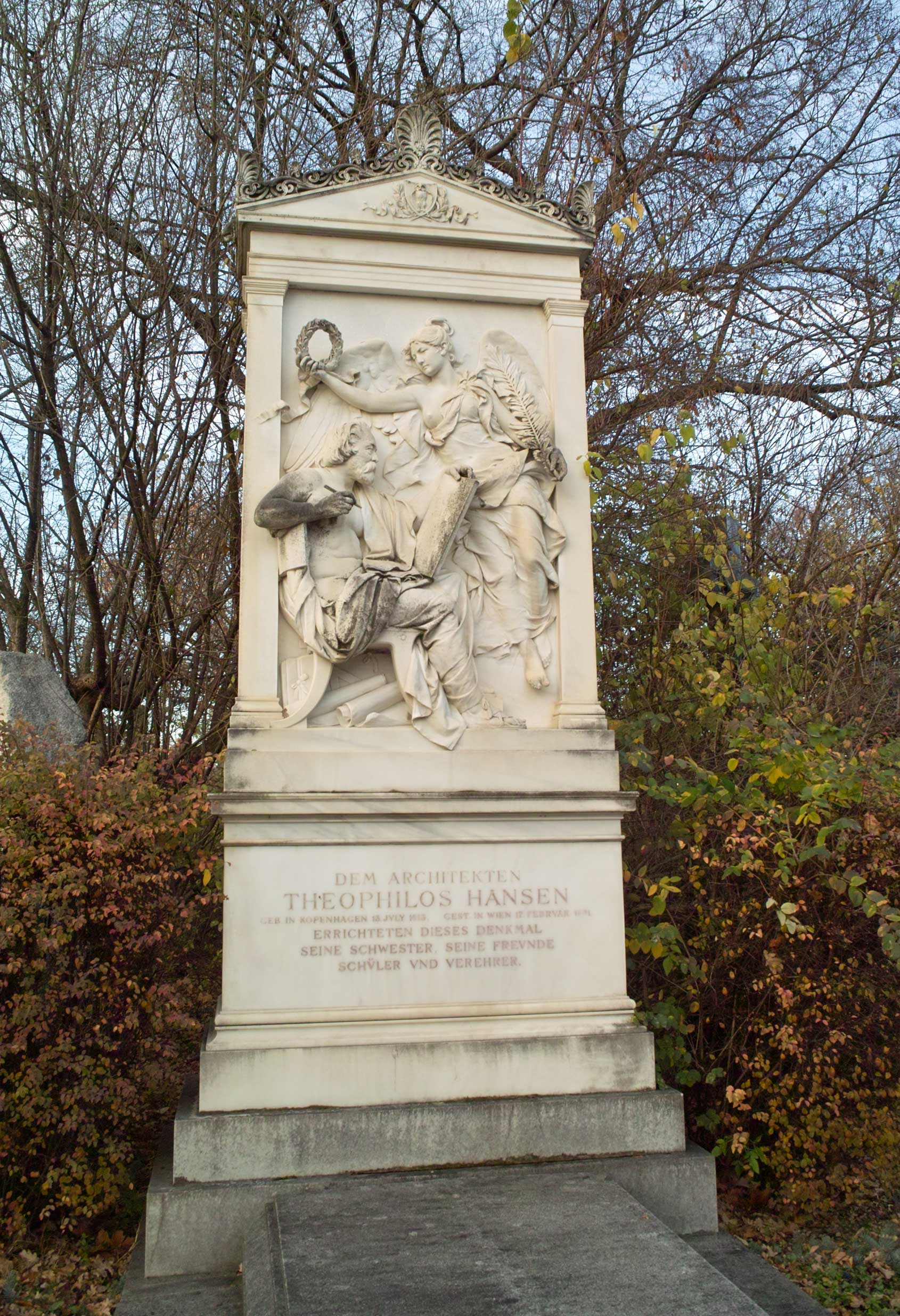
Hansen's grave at the Vienna Central Cemetery

Baron Theophil Edvard von Hansen (German: [ˈteːofiːl fɔn ˈhanzn̩]; original Danish name: Theophilus Hansen, pronounced [tsʰe̝oˈfiːlus ˈhænˀsn̩]; 13 July 1813 – 17 February 1891) was a Danish architect who later became an Austrian citizen. He became particularly well known for his buildings and structures in Athens and Vienna, and is considered an outstanding representative of Neoclassicism and Historicism.

== Biography ==
Hansen was born in Copenhagen. After training with Prussian architect Karl Friedrich Schinkel and some years studying in Vienna, he moved to Athens in 1837, where he studied architecture and design, with a concentration and interest in Byzantine architecture. During his stay in Athens, Hansen designed his first building, the National Observatory of Athens and two of the three contiguous buildings forming the so-called "Athenian Trilogy": the Academy of Athens and the National Library of Greece, the third building of the trilogy being the National and Capodistrian University of Athens, which was designed by his brother Hans Christian Hansen (1803–1883).

The Greek-Austrian entrepreneur Georgios Sinas (1783–1856), who donated the observatory, called Hansen to Vienna in 1846, where Hansen took up an apprenticeship with noted Austrian architect Ludwig Förster (1797–1863). In his early works, such as the museum in the Vienna Arsenal, Hansen was still rather aligned to a more romantic style. In later years, he became the most outstanding representative of Renaissance-inspired historicism (Neo-Renaissance), which also came to be known as Viennese-style. This style extended into the smallest details of the interior design and partially accepted the courses of a synthesis of the arts.

Along with Förster and many others, Hansen was one of the most important and influential architects of the Viennese Ringstraße. His most famous work is the Austrian Parliament building, which was created in the style of an ancient, neo-classic temple, and serves to refer to the Greek beginnings of democracy. Hansen was originally a staunch critic of the Classical style that was taught to him at the Copenhagen Academy. Over the years, however, he came to incorporate Classical elements into his forms. Bauleiter on this project was Swiss-Austrian architect Hans Auer (1847–1906) who would go on to win the competition for the Swiss Bundeshaus.

Hansen's Musikverein in Vienna is a concert hall noted for its design and acoustics.

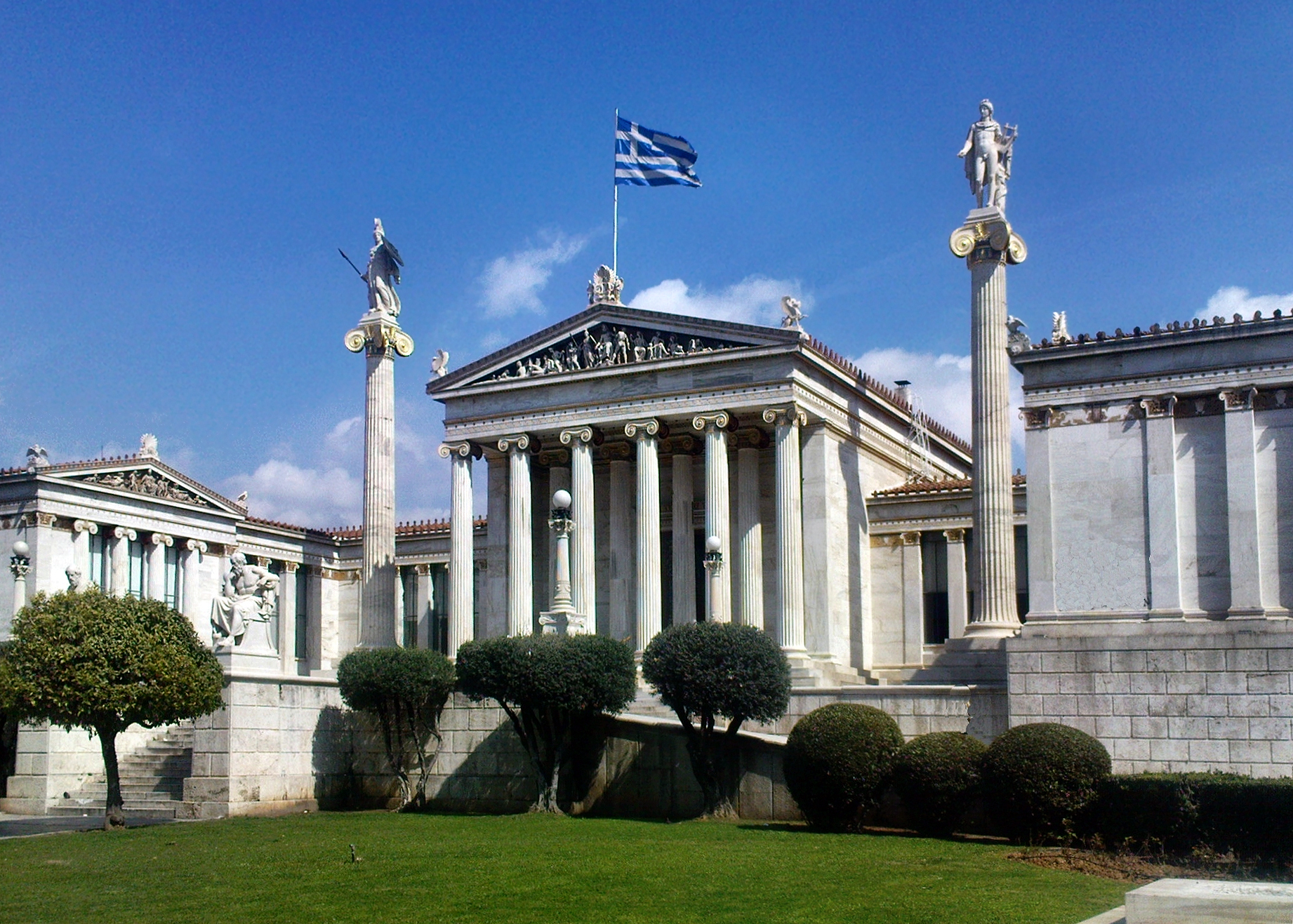
The modern Academy of Athens, next to the University of Athens and the National Library (not shown) forming "the Athenian Trilogy". The academy and the university buildings were designed by Theophil Hansen (1885) in Greek Ionic, academically correct even to the polychrome sculpture. The statues and columns were worked by Leonidas Drosis and Franz Melnitzky.

Hansen worked together with Austrian sculptor Vincenz Pilz (1816–1896) and artist Carl Rahl (1812–1865), as well as with architect Otto Wagner (1841–1918).

In 1884 Emperor Franz Joseph honoured Hansen with a barony in the Austrian nobility and he was since styled "Freiherr von Hansen".

He died in 1891 in Vienna.

== Work ==
- National Observatory of Athens, 1842
- House of Military Invalids, Lviv, 1851–1863
- Academy of Athens, Athens, starting from 1856
- Museum of Military History in the Vienna Arsenal, 1856
- Old Municipal Hospital in Patras, Greece, 1857
- Cemetery chapel Christuskirche at the Matzleinsdorf Protestant Cemetery, Vienna, 1858
- Holy Trinity Greek Orthodox Church, Vienna, 1858–1861
- Palais Todesco, Ringstrasse, Vienna, 1861–1864
- Palace of Archduke Wilhelm, Vienna, 1864–1868
- Musikverein, Vienna, 1867–1870
- Academy of Fine Arts Vienna, 1871–1876
- Philharmonic Concert Hall, Brno, 1871–1873
- Vienna Stock Exchange, 1874–1877
- Austrian Parliament Building, Vienna, 1874–1883
- Zappeion, Athens, 1874–1888
- New Lutheran church, Kežmarok, 1879–1892
- Castle Nadelburg, Lichtenwörth, Lower Austria 1880–1882
- National Library of Greece, Athens, starting from 1888

== Gallery ==
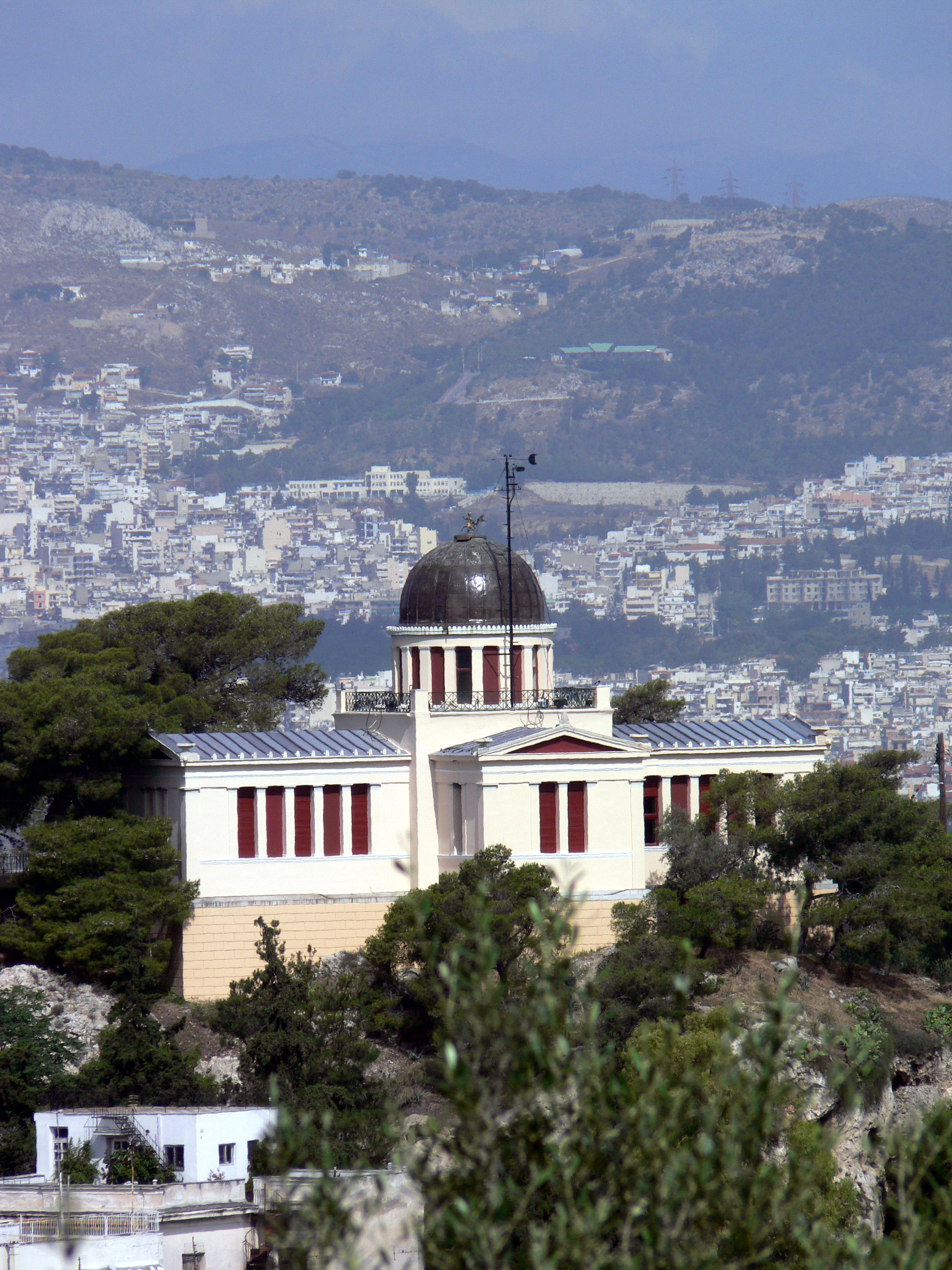
Athens Observatorium

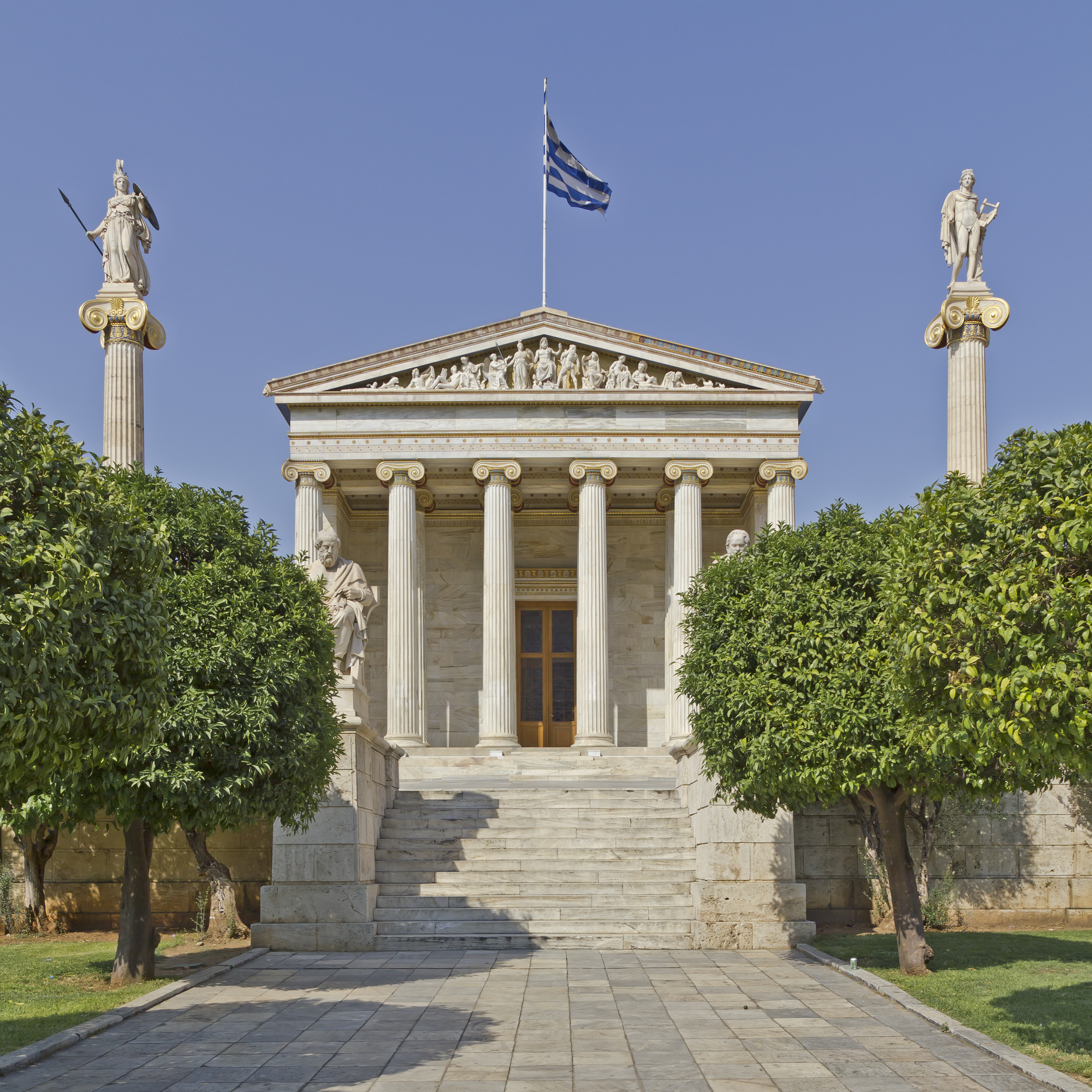
Academy of Athens part of the 'Athenian Trilogy' in Athens

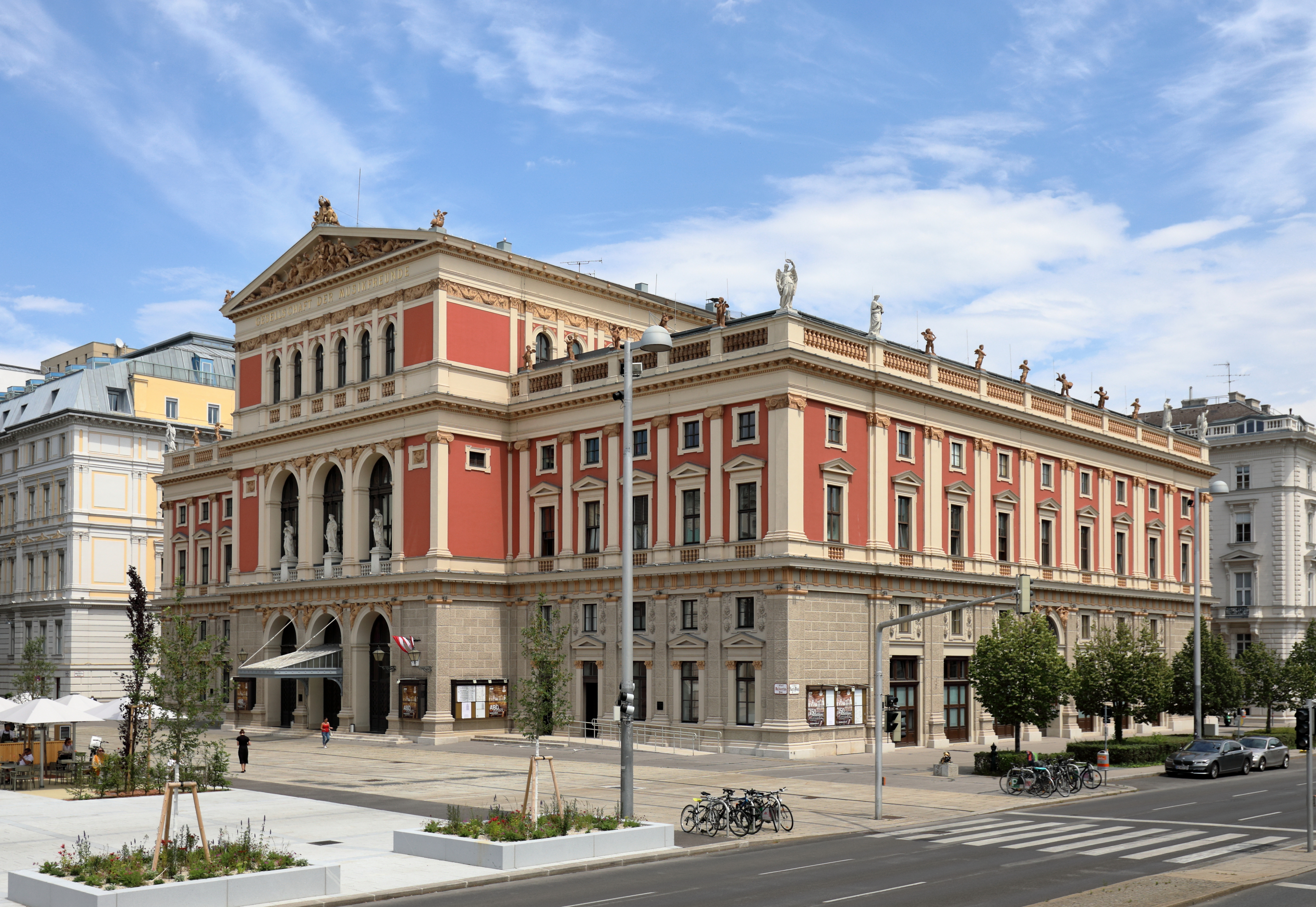
Musikverein building in Vienna

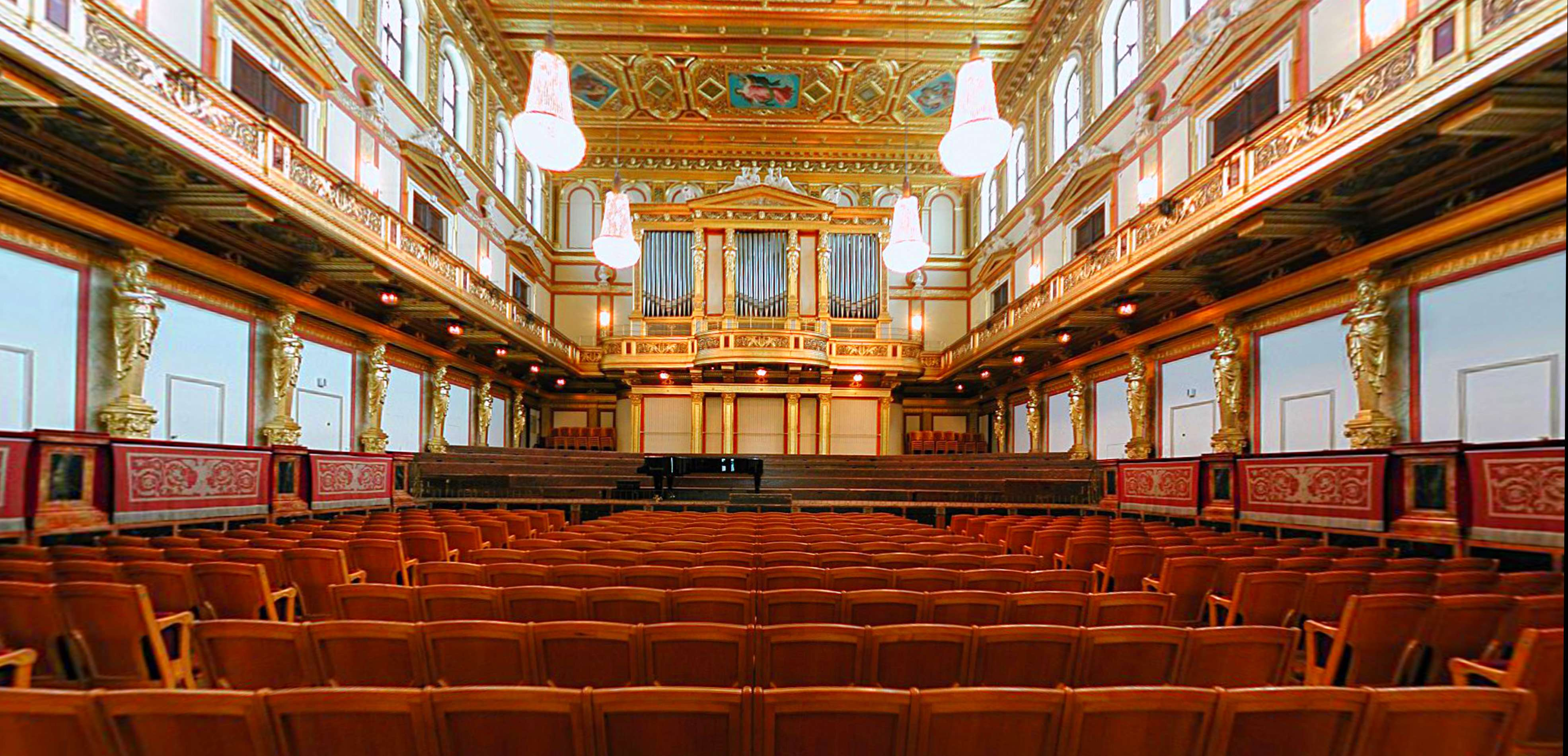
Goldener Saal in the Musikvereinsgebäude in Vienna

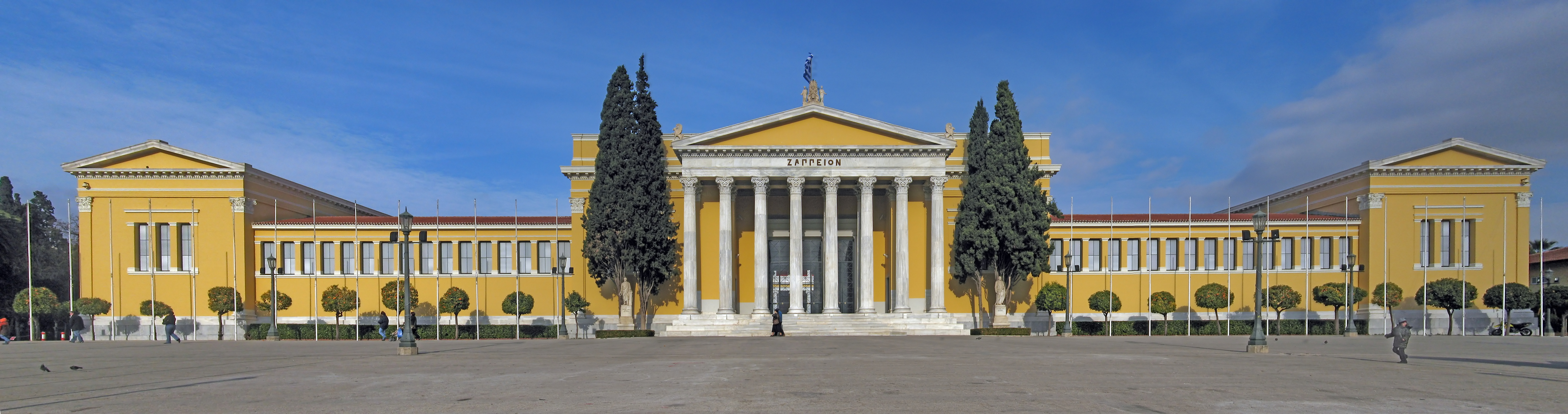
The Zappeion Megaron in Athens

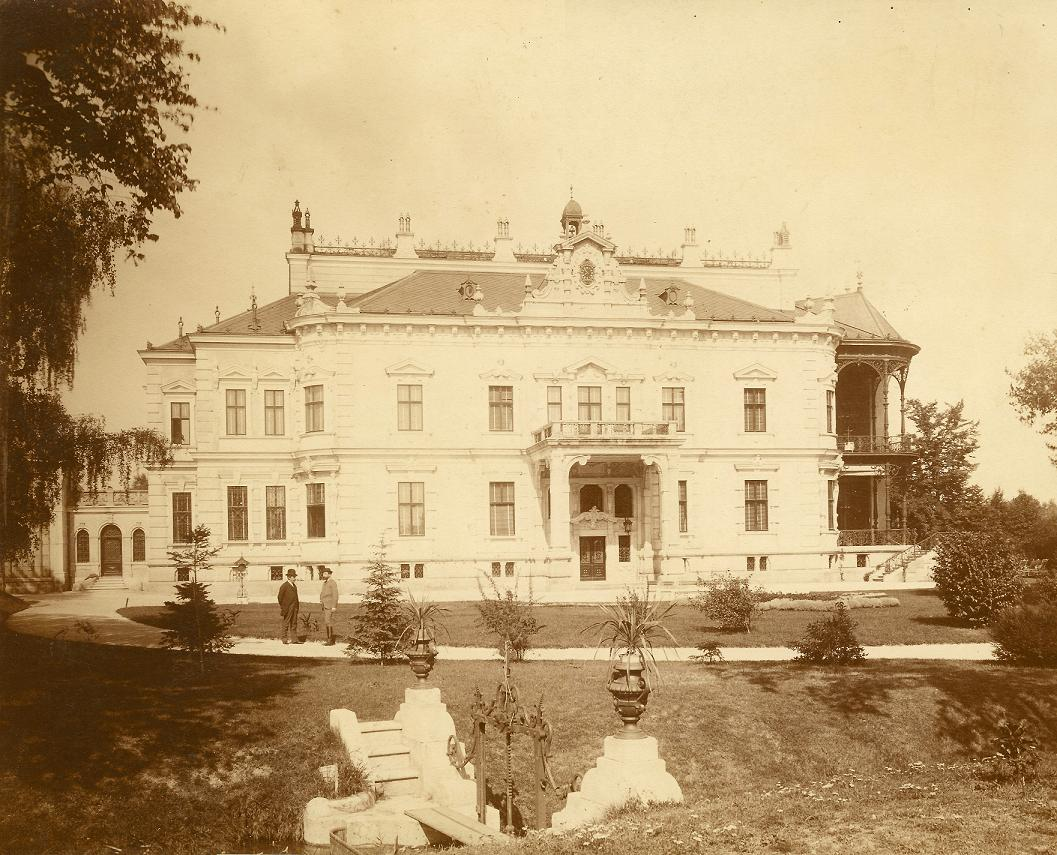
Castle Nadelburg in Lichtenwörth, Lower Austria

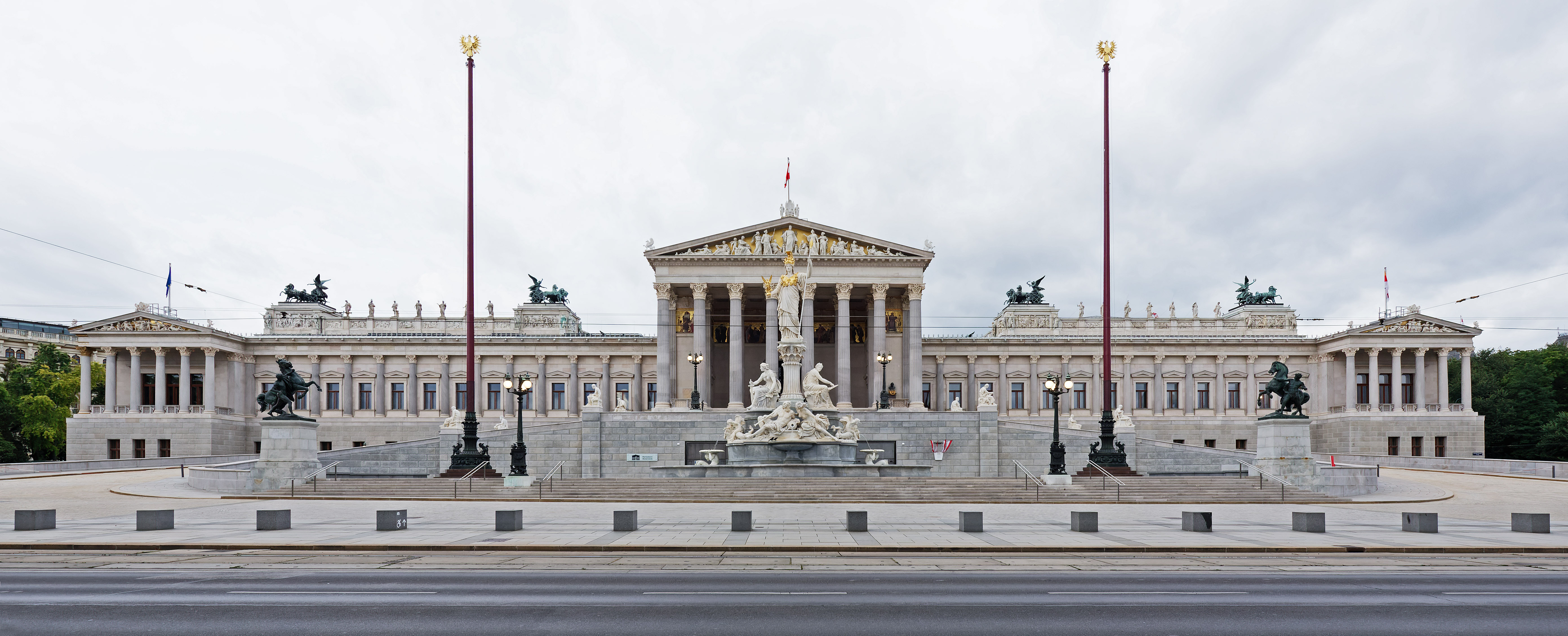
Reichsrat in Vienna, today the Austrian Parliament Building

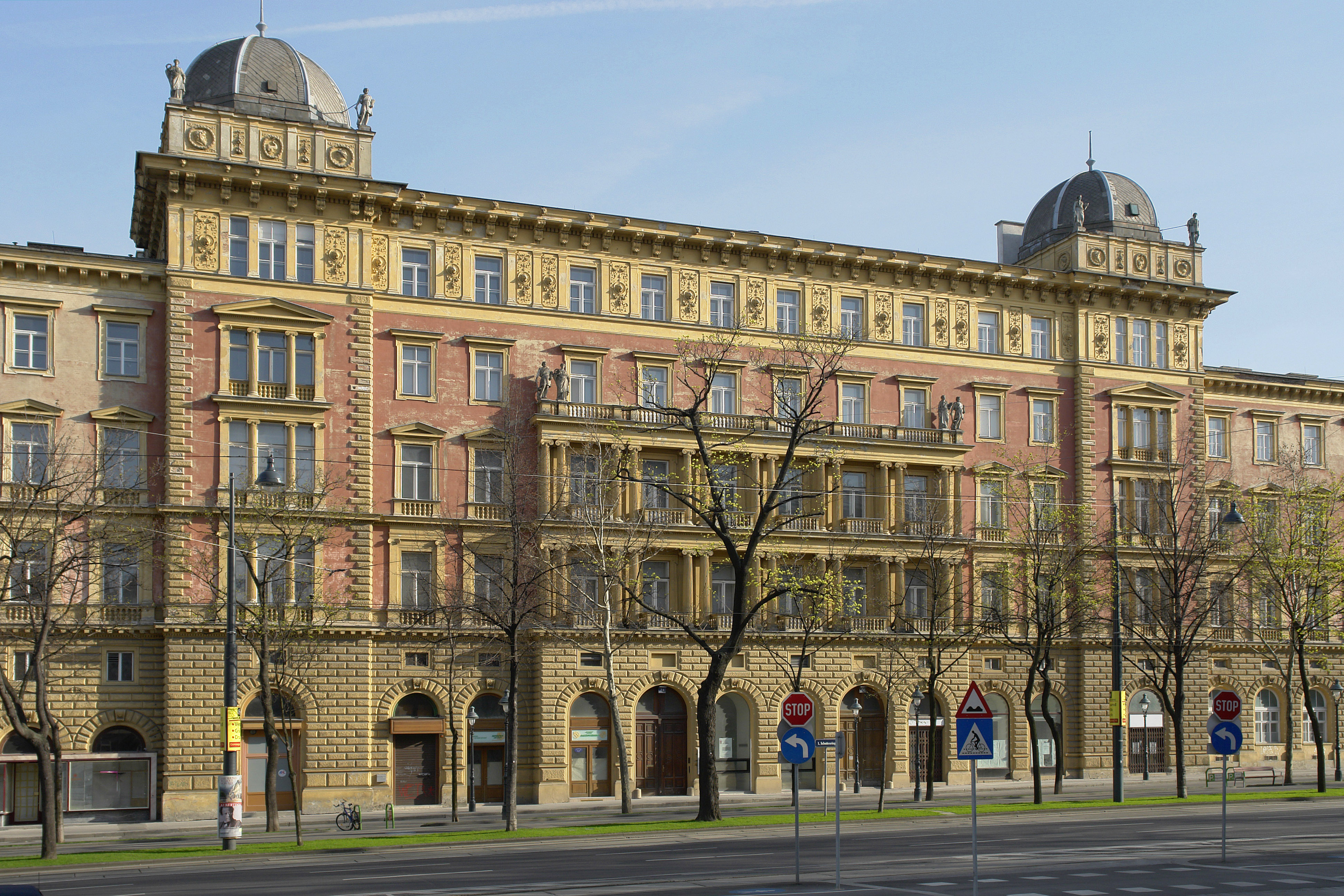
Palais Hansen in Vienna

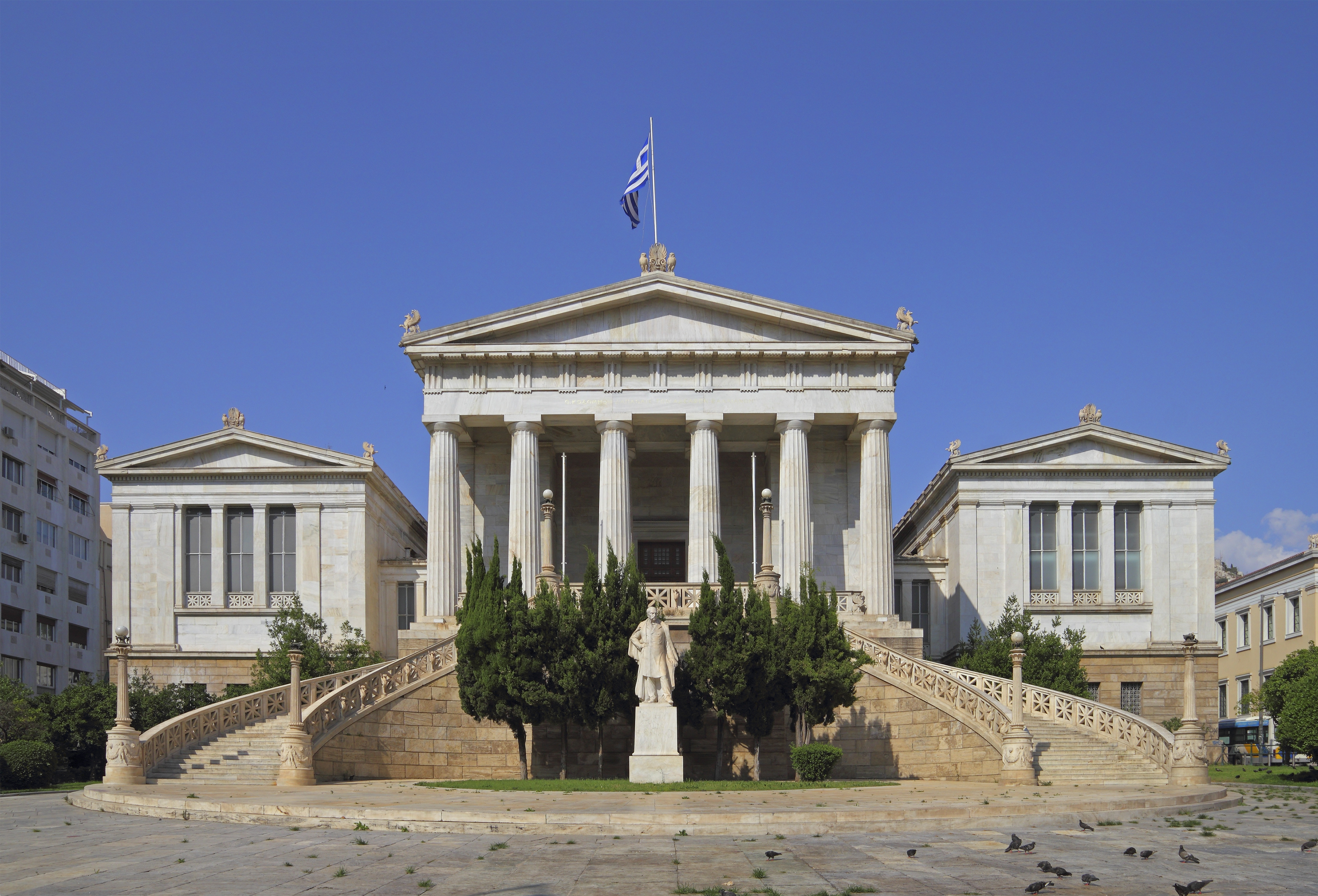
National Library of Greece

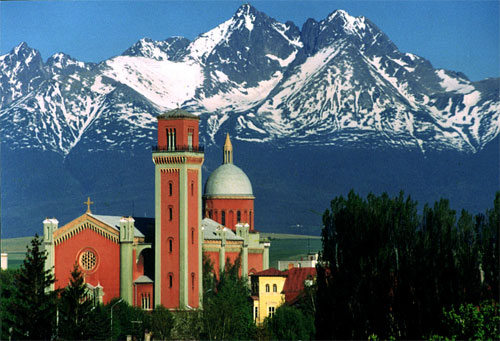
New Lutheran church in Kežmarok
