= Siegfried Selberherr =

Austrian microelectronics scientist

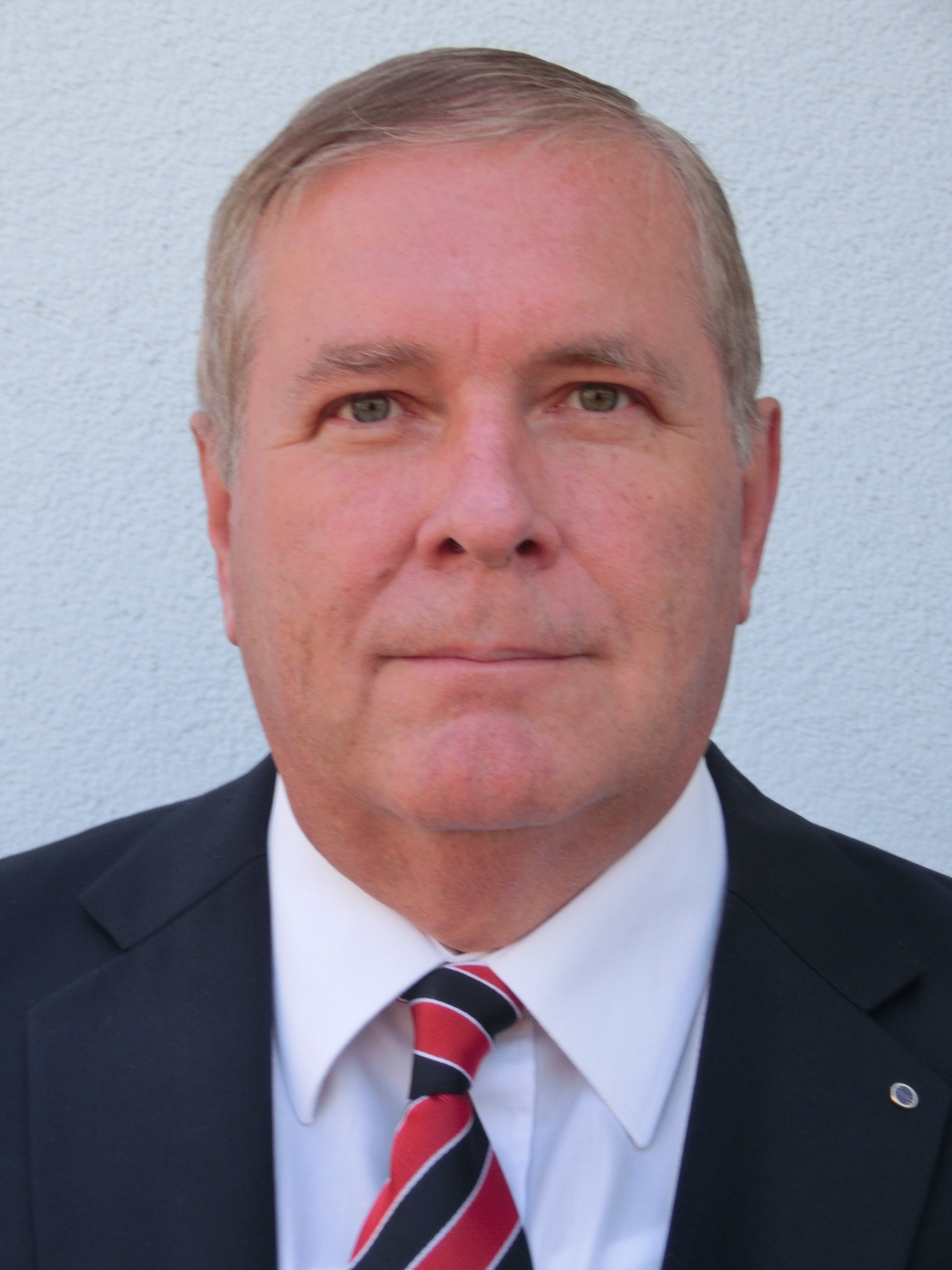

Siegfried Selberherr (born 3 August 1955 in Klosterneuburg) is an Austrian scientist in the field of microelectronics. He is a professor at the Institute for Microelectronics of the Technische Universität Wien (TU Wien). His primary research interest is in modeling and simulation of physical phenomena in the field of microelectronics.

== Biography ==
Since 1988 Siegfried Selberherr is a chair professor for software technology of microelectronic systems at the TU Wien. He studied electrical engineering at the TU Wien, where he received the degree of Diplom-Ingenieur and the doctoral degree in technical sciences in 1978 and 1981, respectively, and the Habilitation in 1984. Afterwards he was a visiting researcher with the Bell-Labs for some time. Between 1996 and 2020 Prof. Selberherr was a Distinguished Lecturer of the IEEE Electron Devices Society. For many years, Prof. Selberherr was a leader of the Institute for Microelectronics at the TU Wien (now this Institute is headed by his younger colleague Tibor Grasser). In the years 1998-2005 he was the Dean of the Faculty of Electrical Engineering and Information Technology. Moreover, between 2001 and 2018 he was member and deputy chairman of the supervisory board of ams AG and since then serves as scientific advisor to the board. Since 2004 he is a member of the advisory board of the Inter-University Department for Agrobiotechnology (IFA-Tulln).

== Accomplishments ==
In his scientific career Prof. Selberherr has published, with his teams of researchers, so far over 400 journal papers and over 1200 articles in conference proceedings, of which more than 250 have been with an invited talk. Additionally, he published 3 books and co-edited more than 40 volumes, and he supervised, so far, more than 100 dissertations.

During his research work Prof. Selberherr has developed a simulator for 'Metal-Oxide-Semiconductor' devices (MINIMOS), in which a mobility model for charge carriers is implemented, which is named after him. Moreover, he supervised numerous research projects with well-known semiconductor companies and funding agencies, like the Austrian Science Fund (FWF), the Christian Doppler Research Association (CDG), and the European Research Council (ERC).

== Awards ==
(Selection)

- 2021: 'Fellow' of the Asia-Pacific Artificial Intelligence Association, AAIA
- 2021: 'Life Fellow' of the Institute of Electrical and Electronics Engineers, IEEE
- 2018: IEEE Cledo Brunetti Award
- 2015: 'Franz Dinghofer Medal' of the Dinghofer Institute
- 2014: Marin Drinov decoration of honour on ribbon of the Bulgarian Academy of Sciences
- 2013: Full Member of the Academia Europaea
- 2011: Silver Commander's Cross of the Order of Merit for Distinguished Service for the Federal Province of Lower Austria
- 2009: 'Advanced Grant' of the ERC
- 2006: Honorary Doctorate of the University of Niš
- 2005: Grand Decoration of Honour for Services to the Republic of Austria
- 2004: Full Member of the European Academy of Sciences and Arts
- 2001: 'Erwin Schrödinger Award' of the Austrian Academy of Sciences, ÖAW
- 1994: 'Wilhelm Exner Medal' of the Austrian Association for Small and Medium-sized Enterprises, ÖGV.
- 1993: 'Fellow' of the Institute of Electrical and Electronics Engineers, IEEE
- 1986: 'Heinz Zemanek Award' of the Austrian Computer Society, ÖCG
- 1983: 'Dr. Ernst Fehrer Award' of the TU Wien

== Important publications ==
(Selection)

=== Journals ===
- L. Filipovic, S. Selberherr. Thermo-Electro-Mechanical Simulation of Semiconductor Metal Oxide Gas Sensors., Materials, Vol.12, No.15 pp. 2410-1–2410-37, 2019, doi:10.3390/ma12152410.
- V. Sverdlov, S. Selberherr. Silicon Spintronics: Progress and Challenges., Physics Reports, Vol.585, pp. 1–40, 2015, doi:10.1016/j.physrep.2015.05.002.
- H. Ceric, S. Selberherr. Electromigration in Submicron Interconnect Features of Integrated Circuits., Materials Science and Engineering R, Vol.71, pp. 53–86, 2011, doi:10.1016/j.mser.2010.09.001.
- V. Sverdlov, E. Ungersboeck, H. Kosina, S. Selberherr. Current Transport Models for Nanoscale Semiconductor Devices., Materials Science and Engineering R, Vol.58, No.6-7, pp. 228–270, 2008, doi:10.1016/j.mser.2007.11.001.
- T. Grasser, T.-W. Tang, H. Kosina, S. Selberherr. A Review of Hydrodynamic and Energy-Transport Models for Semiconductor Device Simulation., Proceedings of the IEEE, Vol.91, No.2, pp. 251–274, 2003, doi:10.1109/JPROC.2002.808150.
- S. Selberherr, A. Schütz, H. Pötzl. MINIMOS – A Two-Dimensional MOS Transistor Analyzer., IEEE Trans.Electron Devices, Vol.ED-27, No.8, pp. 1540–1550, 1980, doi:10.1109/T-ED.1980.20068.

=== Books ===
- M. Nedjalkov, I. Dimov, S. Selberherr. Stochastic Approaches to Electron Transport in Micro- and Nanostructures, Birkhäuser, Basel, ISBN 978-3-030-67916-3, 214 pages, 2021, doi:10.1007/978-3-030-67917-0.
- R. Klima, S. Selberherr. Programmieren in C, 3. Auflage, Springer-Verlag, Wien-New York, ISBN 978-3-7091-0392-0, 366 pages, 2010, doi:10.1007/978-3-7091-0393-7.
- J.W. Swart, S. Selberherr, A.A. Susin, J.A. Diniz, N. Morimoto. (Eds.) Microelectronics Technology and Devices, The Electrochemical Society, ISBN 978-1-56677-646-2, 661 pages, 2008.
- T. Grasser, S. Selberherr. (Eds.) Simulation of Semiconductor Processes and Devices, Springer-Verlag, Wien-New York, ISBN 978-3-211-72860-4, 460 pages, 2007, doi:10.1007/978-3-211-72861-1.
- F. Fasching, S. Halama, S. Selberherr. (Eds.) Technology CAD Systems, Springer-Verlag, Wien-New York, ISBN 978-3-7091-9317-4, 309 pages, 1993, doi:10.1007/978-3-7091-9315-0.
- S. Selberherr. Analysis and Simulation of Semiconductor Devices, Springer-Verlag, Wien-New York, ISBN 978-3-7091-8754-8, 294 pages, 1984, doi:10.1007/978-3-7091-8752-4.
