= RAG Austria AG =

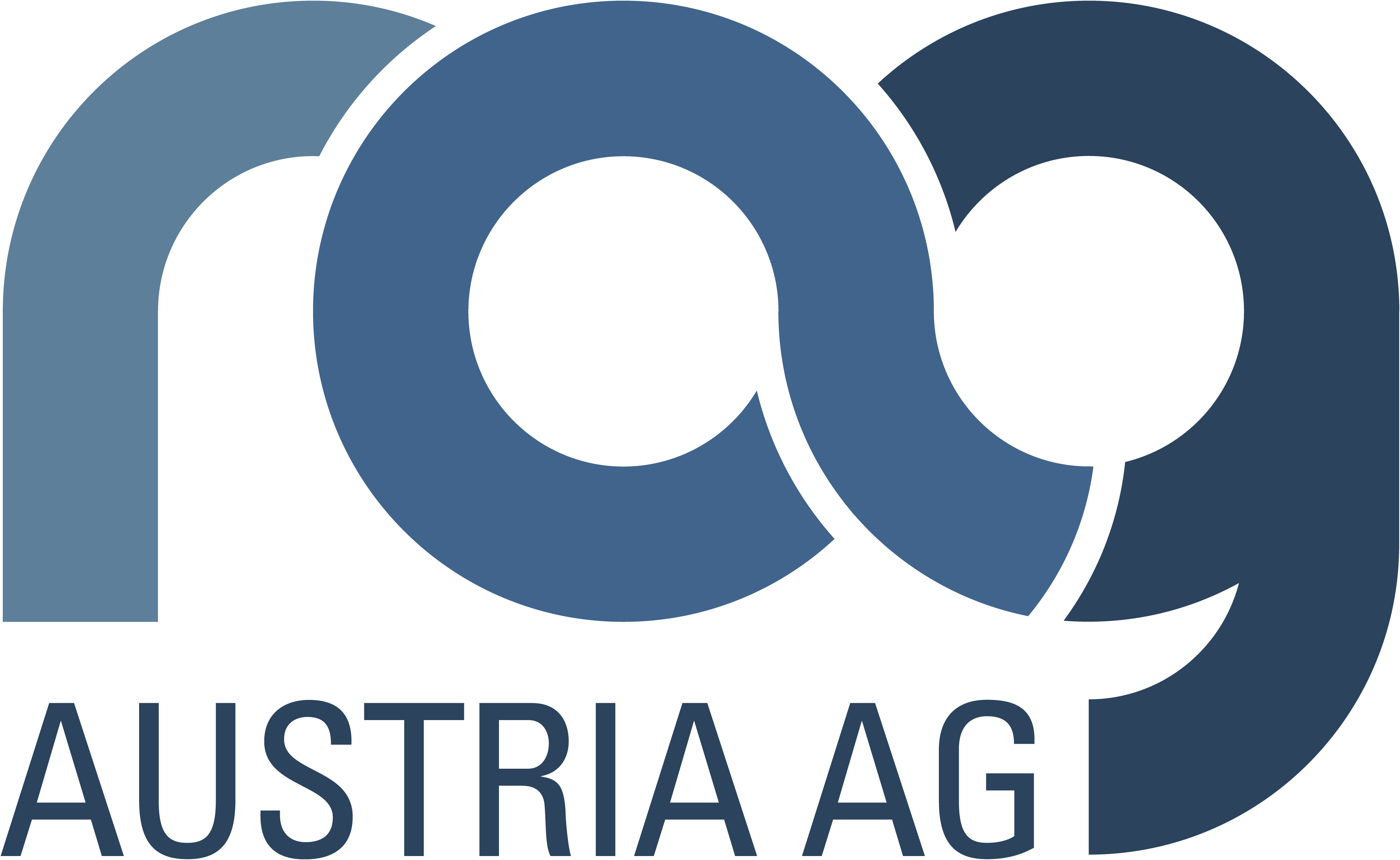
- Company type: Public
- Industry: Energy storage
- Founded: October 15, 1935; 90 years ago
- Headquarters: Vienna, Austria
- Key people: Markus Mitteregger, CEO; Michael Längle, CFO
- Revenue: €509.4 million (2018)
- Number of employees: 196 (2020)
- Subsidiaries: RAG Energy Storage GmbH (100 %); RAG Exploration & Production GmbH (100 %); Silenos Energy GmbH (50 %) – Geothermal energy
- Website: www.rag-austria.at

RAG Austria AG (RAG) is the largest gas storage operator and thus energy storage company in Austria. The company focuses its business activities on the storage of natural gas and other gaseous energy and the development of green-gas technologies (e.g. research projects such as Underground Sun Storage and Underground Sun Conversion). With a total storage capacity of more than six billion cubic meters of natural gas, RAG contributes to the security of supply of Austria and Central Europe. RAG operates the Haidach gas storage facility (Salzburg/Upper Austria) in joint ventures with Gazprom Export and Wingas as well as the 7Fields gas storage facility (Salzburg/Upper Austria) together with Uniper (former E.ON Gas Storage). In addition RAG operates its own storage facilities at Puchkirchen/Haag, Haidach 5, Aigelsbrunn, 7Fields(RAG). The production and use of gas as fuel (LNG, CNG) are also business areas of RAG.

Shareholders are Energieversorgung Niederösterreich (EVN) (50,025 %), Uniper (29,975 %), Energie Steiermark Kunden GmbH (10%) and Salzburg AG (10%).

The company was founded in 1935 as Rohöl-Gewinnungs AG by Socony-Vacuum Oil, Inc. (today Exxon Mobil Corporation) and N.V. de Bataafsche Petroleum Maatschappij (today Royal Dutch Shell). In 1937 the first major oil discovery was made with the RAG II well about two kilometres north of Zistersdorf. In 1936 and 1937, the company secured the largest part of the Vienna Basin with 7000 freehold exploration rights.

After the State Treaty of 1955, the ÖMV, which had emerged from the Soviet Mineral Oil Administration (Sowjetische Mineralölverwaltung), began to dominate Eastern Austria. Therefore RAG gradually shifted the focus of its production to Upper Austria.

== History ==
=== Zistersdorf oil field and Soviet occupation ===
In 1938, with the development of the Gaiselberg oil field, the oil discovery that made the small town of Zistersdorf the epitome of the oil wealth of the Vienna Basin, took place. The oil-bearing layers of the Gaiselberg field, located almost one kilometer south-west of Zistersdorf, cover an area of only about 2.5 km², but along a geological fracture (the so-called Steinbergbruch) there are a number of oil-bearing layers one above the other, whose depth ranges from 800 m to almost 2,400 m.

During the period of the "Anschluss" of Austria to Nazi Germany from 1938 to 1945, the RAG was continued as "enemy property" by a German asset manager. In the following period of Soviet occupation of Eastern Austria from 1945 to 1955, the RAG was de facto not nationalised despite a decision in 1946, but most of the drilling equipment was taken to the USSR as spoils of war and the entire production had to be transferred to the Soviet Petroleum Administration. As a result, the production rights in the Vienna Basin were also restricted to the two oil fields RAG/Gösting and Gaiselberg, which existed before 1945, and which remained so even after the withdrawal of the Soviet occupying power in 1955.

In 1948 and 1951, however, RAG received research assignments from the Geological Survey of Austria in the former US occupation zone in Upper Austria. In May 1956, a new deep drilling rig made Austria's first major oil discovery outside the Vienna Basin near Puchkirchen. The following years were rather sobering. Only near Ried im Innkreis a significant oil field was discovered in 1959.

=== Concessions in Upper Austria ===
In 1960 RAG's concession area in Upper Austria was extended to the area south of Wels. As early as 1962, the most productive Austrian oil field outside the Vienna Basin to date was discovered in Voitsdorf in the municipality of Ried im Traunkreis. The field extends to about 10 km in an east-west direction and was developed via 43 wells, 10 of which were still being used for production in 2007. The north-south extension is only slightly more than one kilometre. More than 3 million tons of oil have been extracted from the two oil-bearing horizons at depths of 2100 to 2200 metres.

Around the Voitsdorf field, further large oil fields were developed until 1980: Eberstalzell (previous oil production approx. 500,000 tons; 2012 3 wells active), Engenfeld (approx. 150,000 tons; 2012 1 well active), Oberaustall (approx. 200,000 tons; 2012 1 well active), Sattledt (approx. 1 million tons, 2012 6 wells active) and Steinhaus (approx. 200,000 tons; 2012 1 well active).

In 1968, the highest annual production in the company's history was achieved with 419,118 tons of crude oil, more than half of which came from the Voitsdorf field. After that, crude oil production declined and reached its temporary low in 2005 with only 75,275 tons. Since then, the discovery of larger reservoirs in Hiersdorf west of Wartberg an der Krems as well as near Bad Hall and Sierning has increased production to 123,704 tons (15% of Austrian crude oil production) by 2011, of which 104,204 tons came from the foothills of the Upper Austrian Alps and 19,500 tons from the two fields near Zistersdorf.

RAG has developed a total of about 50 oil and gas fields in Austria to date. Due to the rise in oil prices, the relatively expensive development of oil reservoirs in Austria has been intensified again in recent years. After 2000, this led to several major oil discoveries in the eastern concession area around the health resort of Bad Hall.

=== Natural gas production ===
In the 1970s, the development of natural gas reservoirs became more important. Especially in western Upper Austria, about 15 km on each side of a line from Kremsmünster to Burghausen, a large number of medium-sized and smaller natural gas reservoirs were discovered, mostly at depths of 500 m to 1500 m. In 1997, the Haidach natural gas reservoir (Straßwalchen, Upper Austria) was discovered using modern geophysical methods. With a total volume of 4.3 billion cubic metres of natural gas, this was one of the largest gas discoveries in Austria. In 1977, the largest annual production was achieved with almost 880 million cubic metres of natural gas. In 2018, the annual production was 135 million cubic metres of natural gas. | Turnover = 509.4 million euros (2018)

=== Natural gas reservoirs ===
Austria has geological structures that are suitable for natural gas storage (underground storage). Since 1982, RAG has been using former natural gas reservoirs as natural gas storage facilities, thus increasing the security of supply with natural gas. RAG now uses more than 50% of its former natural gas reservoirs as underground storage facilities. The Puchkirchen gas field near Timelkam was successively converted into an underground gas storage facility from the 1980s onwards, and in 1995 the first commercial large-scale storage facility went into operation with a storage volume of 500 million cubic metres. The current capacity in combination with the Haag storage facility is around 1.080 billion cubic metres of natural gas (2019). After extensions in 1995 and 2002, the current capacity is around 860 million cubic metres of natural gas. By 2010, including the Haag gas field at Hausruck approx. 20 km north of the existing storage facility, capacity was increased to 1.1 billion cubic metres of natural gas.

In May 2007, the Haidach storage facility at Straßwalchen went into operation, a collaboration project with the partners Gazprom Export and Wingas. Following an expansion in 2011, Haidach has now a storage volume of 2.9 billion cubic meters of natural gas. Haidach is the second largest storage facility in Central Europe. With the 7Fields natural gas storage facility, further former natural gas reservoirs have been adapted for use as underground storage facilities. 7Fields is a collaboration project between RAG and the German company Uniper (former EON Gas Storage). As with the Haidach storage facility, RAG acted as planner, constructor and technical operator. Marketing is carried out by RAG Energy Storage (RES) and Uniper. After a construction period of two years, the first expansion stage (Zagling storage facility near Straßwalchen and Nussdorf with a combined volume of around 1.2 billion cubic metres) was completed in April 2011 and the second expansion stage (Oberkling/Pfaffstätt storage facility south-west of Mattighofen) in April 2014. Following further capacity adjustments, the storage volume is now around 2 billion cubic meters of natural gas.

=== Recent company development ===
In order to meet the demands of a decarbonised future, two companies emerged from Rohöl-Aufsuchungs AG in 2018: RAG Austria AG and RAG Exploration & Production GmbH. RAG Austria AG focuses on the core business of gas storage as well as new energy technologies (“Underground Sun Storage”, “Underground Sun Conversion”), develops and expands them. Further business areas are the production, supply and trading of gas as well as the use and marketing of gas as a fuel (CNG, LNG). RAG Exploration & Production GmbH is dedicated to the exploration and production of crude oil.

== Business Areas ==
=== Gas production ===
Natural gas is produced from reservoirs in Upper Austria and Salzburg. In addition, RAG is conducting research on the production of renewable gas in the Underground Sun Conversion project. Hydrogen produced from wind and solar energy is converted into renewable gas underground in natural reservoirs using microorganisms and can thus be stored there in large quantities. RAG also implements geothermal projects and thus uses geothermal energy.

=== Energy storage ===
RAG's current core business is the large-scale storage of gaseous energy (methane, hydrogen) in natural underground reservoirs. The gas storage facilities operated by RAG, with a working gas volume of around six billion cubic metres, serve to ensure security of supply in Austria and Europe.

=== Supply ===
The storage facilities and storage services of RAG are part of the critical infrastructure of Austria according to Directive 2008/114/EC of the Council of the European Union. RAG provides its services all year round and without interruption. From its own production, RAG supplies regional natural gas and geothermal energy independent of imports. RAG also operates its own CNG and LNG filling stations.

=== Natural gas vehicles – LNG and CNG ===
Since 2017, RAG has been operating Austria's first LNG filling station in Ennshafen near Linz. The natural gas comes, among other things, from domestic RAG natural gas reservoirs and is processed in RAG's own LNG facility in Gampern in Upper Austria, where about two tons of LNG are produced per day. This corresponds to a refuelling of 10-15 trucks per day. In 2019, Austria's second LNG filling station was opened in Feldkirchen near Graz. F. Leitner Mineralöle and RAG Austria AG invested a total of 1.5 million Euros in this project. With a storage capacity of 50 cubic metres of LNG, the facility is the largest in Austria.

=== New technologies ===
RAG is developing sustainable technologies to store renewable energy (sun, wind) and thus make it available to consumers efficiently and on a large scale. Energy supply should be guaranteed throughout the year, especially during seasonal fluctuations due to peak in demand during longer periods of darkness or low water. In 2018 RAG invested 6.9 million euros in research and development.

In 2013, the research project “Underground Sun Storage”, supported by the Austrian Climate and Energy Fund, demonstrated that hydrogen produced from renewable energies via electrolysis can be stored in natural gas reservoirs. The follow-up project “Underground Sun Conversion”, which was started in 2017, takes a significant step forward. Since 2018 in a test facility in Pilsbach (Upper Austria), hydrogen, which is produced from renewable electricity in a power-to-gas facility, has been injected together with CO_{2} into a natural gas reservoir at a depth of over 1,000 metres. This unique method recreates the process by which natural gas originates, but shortens it by millions of years – like geological history in fast motion. Converting the energy, increasing the energy density and storing it take place out of sight, in porous rock formations at depths of over 1,000 metres. There, naturally occurring microorganisms produce natural gas that can be stored directly and withdrawn at any time as required. This is a reproduction of the natural process of natural gas production within a few weeks. In this way, renewable energies can be stored and a sustainable, CO_{2}-neutral carbon cycle is created in existing infrastructure. The project is scheduled for completion in 2021.

“Underground Sun Conversion” is also supported by the Austrian Government's Climate and Energy Fund as a lead project in energy research with 5 million Euros. The Austrian consortium is headed by RAG. Project partners are: University of Leoben, University of Natural Resources and Applied Life Sciences in Vienna (Department IFA Tulln), ACIB GmbH (Austrian Centre of Industrial Biotechnology), Energy Institute at the Johannes Kepler University Linz and Axiom Angewandte Prozesstechnik GmbH.
