= Representative democracy =

Type of democracy principled on elected representation

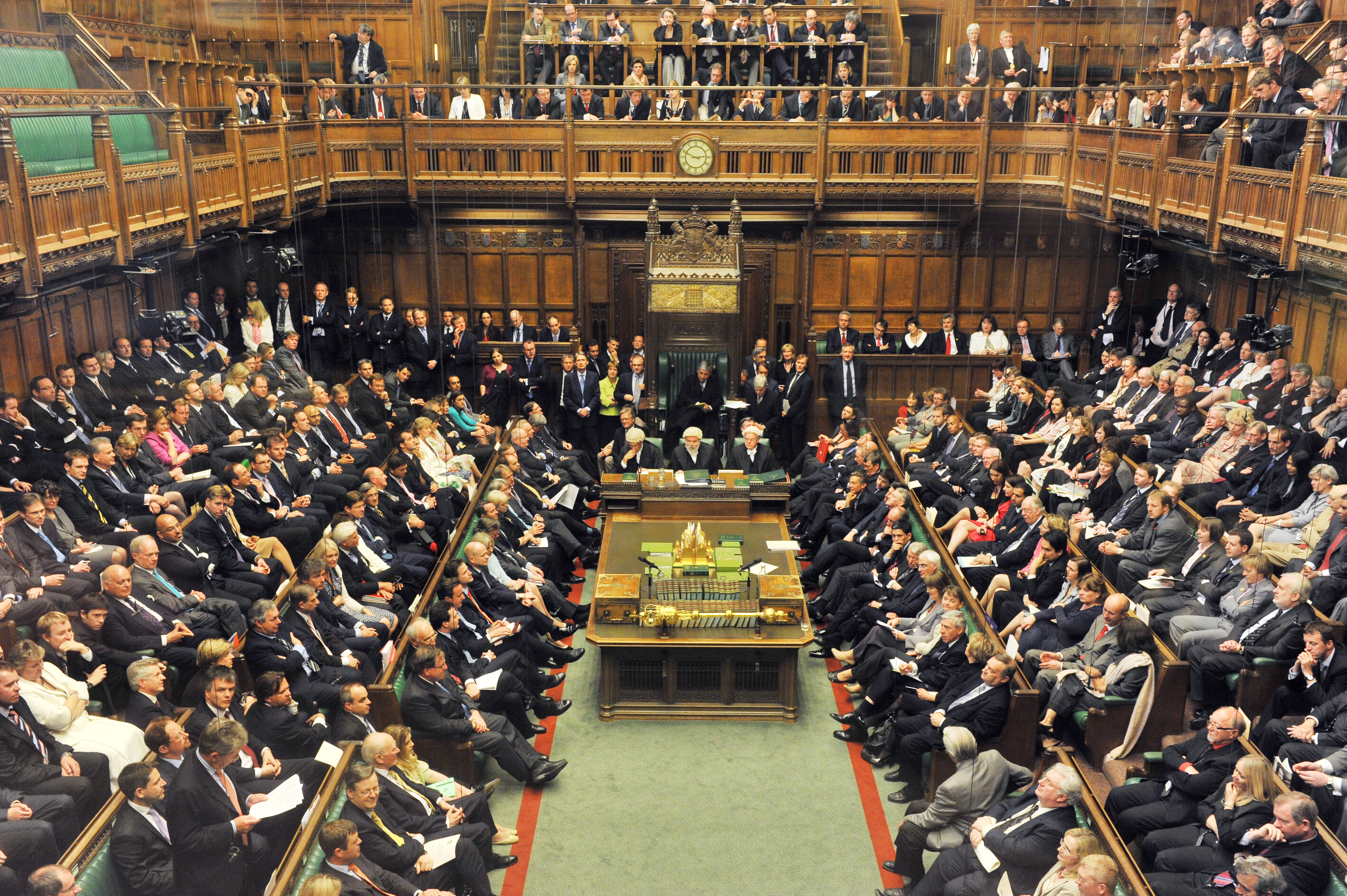
The House of Commons of the United Kingdom

Representative democracy, also known as indirect democracy or electoral democracy, is a type of democracy where elected delegates represent a group of people, in contrast to direct democracy. Nearly all modern Western-style democracies function as some type of representative democracy: for example, the United Kingdom (a unitary parliamentary constitutional monarchy), Germany (a federal parliamentary republic), France (a unitary semi-presidential republic), and the United States (a federal presidential republic). Unlike liberal democracy, a representative democracy may have de facto multiparty, free and fair elections, but may not have a fully developed rule of law and additional individual and minority rights beyond the electoral sphere.

Representative democracy places power in the hands of elected representatives. Political parties often become central to this form of democracy if electoral systems require or encourage voters to vote for political parties or for candidates associated with political parties (as opposed to voting for individual representatives). Some political theorists (including Robert Dahl, Gregory Houston, and Ian Liebenberg) have described representative democracy as polyarchy.

Representative democracy can be organized in different ways including both parliamentary and presidential systems of government. Elected representatives typically form a legislature (such as a parliament or congress), which may be composed of a single chamber (unicameral), two chambers (bicameral), or more than two chambers (multicameral). Where two or more chambers exist, their members are often elected in different ways.

== Powers of representatives ==
In representative democracies, members are elected to legislative chambers by voters, as in elections of national legislatures. In addition to being legislators themselves, elected representatives may have the power to select a president, other legislators or other officers of the government or of the legislature, as the prime minister under the parliamentary system.

The power of representatives is usually curtailed by a constitution (as in constitutional democracies or constitutional monarchies) or other measures.

- An independent judiciary may have the power to declare legislative acts unconstitutional (e.g. constitutional court, supreme court).
- The constitution may also provide for some deliberative democracy (e.g., Royal Commissions) or direct popular measures (e.g., initiative, referendum, recall elections). However, these are not always binding and usually require some legislative action—legal power usually remains firmly with representatives.
- An "upper house" in a bicameral structure may or may not be elected by voters. The Senate of Canada and the British House of Lords are not elected.

Edmund Burke stated that the duty of a representative is not necessarily to simply follow the wishes of the electorate but also to use their own judgment in the exercise of their powers, even if their views are not reflective of the voters. An elected member who chooses to execute the wishes of their constituents acts as a delegate. If the member uses their best judgment and knowledge in making decisions, even when constituents do not agree with the decision, the member instead acts as a trustee.

A representative may be elected as a representative of a geographic district, in which voters hold a variety of beliefs, and may then be in the situation where no matter how he votes, he will not be upholding the opinion of a group of voters that it is his job to represent. Under proportional representation systems, a member is elected by a group of votes who form a unanimous constituency, in which voters and the elected representative hold shared sentiment.

Representatives can be elected directly by voters or elected by other representatives through indirect elections. Indirectly elected representatives can have reduced political accountability.

== History ==
=== Ancient and medieval origins ===
The ancient republics like the Roman Republic or Ancient Athens didn't use representation but relied on the meeting of the citizenry ( see Roman assemblies or Ekklesia). The Roman model of governance was considered a mixture between (direct) democracy, aristocracy (in the form of senate for life) and monarchy (in the form of the consuls) and would inspire many political thinkers over the centuries (see mixed government) but the need of convoking people at large made it impractical for large states.

Representative democracy is a form of democracy in which people vote for representatives who then vote on policy initiatives; as opposed to direct democracy, a form of democracy in which people vote on policy initiatives directly. A European medieval tradition of selecting representatives from the various estates (classes, but not as we know them today) to advise/control monarchs led to relatively wide familiarity with representative systems inspired by Roman systems, with the noble and clerical estates being identified with the senatorial aristocracy, and the third estate being identified with the democratic element.

=== Early constitutional development ===
In Britain, representative government grew in the late thirteenth century. The Oxford Parliament of 1258 stripped the king of unlimited authority, and Simon de Montfort's Parliament of 1265 included both noblemen and citizens from each town. Later, in the 17th century, the Parliament of England implemented some of the ideas and systems of liberal democracy, culminating in the Glorious Revolution and passage of the Bill of Rights 1689. Widening of the voting franchise took place through a series of Reform Acts in the 19th and 20th centuries.

Following Corsica's independence from Genoa (1755), the Corsican Republic's Constitution, which was drafted by Pasquale Paoli, included representative democracy and various Enlightenment principles, including female suffrage. Some consider this to be the first written Constitution for a nation state.

=== Expansion ===
The first Corsican Constitution's ideas of independence, democracy and liberty were supported and/or inspired by Enlightenment philosophers including Jean-Jacques Rousseau. The publication in 1768 of James Boswell's "An Account of Corsica" by made Paoli famous throughout Europe and inspired leaders of the American Revolution, such as the Hearts of Oak (New York militia), who included Alexander Hamilton and members of the American Sons of Liberty movement.

The Corsican Republic's Constitution has been summarised as follows: "[it] had extensive suffrage. All men over 25 were allowed to vote for representatives to the diet or serve in it regardless of social class. Women could vote in local elections for mayors. Only the democratically elected diet could pass laws: Ruling through executive fiat was forbidden. The executive branch consisted of a council of state of about 142 rotating members) in addition to Paoli, the president. This body concerned itself with national defense, in part with foreign relations, and with the judiciary. The nation's highest court was composed of four judges, although local judicial bodies made decisions independently. Sentences or fines under 100 lire were final, but more severe verdicts could be appealed if the defendant protested his innocence".

This first Corsican Constitution was revoked when the island was taken over in 1769 taken over by the Kingdom of France

The V-Dem Institute's index of electoral democracy (another term for representative democracy) peaked in 2012, and has since declined, with the decline accelerating in the early 2020s.

The American Revolution led to the creation of a new Constitution of the United States in 1787, with a national legislature based partly on direct elections of representatives every two years, and thus responsible to the electorate for continuance in office. Senators were not directly elected by the people until the adoption of the Seventeenth Amendment in 1913. Women, men who owned no property, and Black people, and others not originally given voting rights, in most states eventually gained the vote through changes in state and federal law in the course of the 19th and 20th centuries. Until it was repealed by the Fourteenth Amendment following the Civil War, the Three-Fifths Compromise gave a disproportionate representation of slave states in the House of Representatives relative to the voters in free states.

The first recorded use of "representative democracy" is on a letter by Alexander Hamilton about the constitution of New York, distinguishing it from both direct democracy and 'compound governments' or mixed regimes.

Hamilton would use the term afterwards to describe the Constitution of the United States during the ratifying convention of New York meaning a government where power is in the people through representatives directly or indirectly chosen by them.

In 1789, Revolutionary France adopted the Declaration of the Rights of Man and of the Citizen and, although short-lived, the National Convention was elected by all males in 1792. Universal male suffrage was re-established in France in the wake of the French Revolution of 1848.

Representative democracy came into general favour particularly in post-Industrial Revolution nation states where large numbers of citizens evinced interest in politics, but where technology and population figures remained unsuited to direct democracy. Many historians credit the Reform Act 1832 with launching modern representative democracy in the United Kingdom.

Spain's Congress of Deputies, one example of representative democracy

Globally, a majority of governments in the world are representative democracies, including constitutional monarchies and republics with strong representative branches.

== Research on representation per se ==
Separate but related, and very large, bodies of research in political philosophy and social science investigate how and how well elected representatives, such as legislators, represent the interests or preferences of one or another constituency. The empirical research shows that representative systems tend to be biased towards the representation of more affluent classes to the detriment of the population at large.

== Criticisms ==
In his book Political Parties, written in 1911, Robert Michels argues that most representative systems deteriorate towards an oligarchy or particracy. This is known as the iron law of oligarchy. Representative democracies which are stable have been analysed by Adolf Gasser and compared to the unstable representative democracies in his book Gemeindefreiheit als Rettung Europas which was published in 1943 and a second edition in 1947. Adolf Gasser stated the following requirements for a representative democracy in order to remain stable, unaffected by the iron law of oligarchy:

- Society has to be built up from bottom to top. As a consequence, society is built up by people, who are free and have the power to defend themselves with weapons.
- These free people join or form local communities. These local communities are independent, which includes financial independence, and they are free to determine their own rules.
- Local communities join into a higher unit, e.g. a canton.
- There is no hierarchical bureaucracy.
- There is competition between these local communities, e.g. on services delivered or on taxes.

A drawback to this type of government is that elected officials are not required to fulfill promises made before their election and are able to promote their own self-interests once elected, providing an incohesive system of governance. Legislators are also under scrutiny as the system of majority-won legislators voting for issues for the large group of people fosters inequality among the marginalized.

Proponents of direct democracy criticize representative democracy due to its inherent structure. As the fundamental basis of representative democracy is non inclusive system, in which representatives turn into an elite class that works behind closed doors, as well as the criticizing the elector system as being driven by a capitalistic and authoritarian system.

The V-Dem Institute classifies electoral democracies as the bare minimum of democracies, describing them as being governments that are "de-facto accountable to citizens through periodic elections", but are not liberal democracies and lack further entrenched individual and minority rights beyond the electoral sphere. Basic representative democracies may not possess a fully developed rule of law, legislative and judicial oversight of the executive branch, protections against the "tyranny of the majority", and only minimal fulfillment of Robert Dahl's institutional prerequisites for democracy.

=== Proposed solutions ===
The system of sortition or stochocracy has been proposed as an improved system compared to the system of representative democracy, where representatives are elected. Stochocracy aims to at least reduce this degradation by having all representatives appointed by lottery instead of by voting. Therefore, this system is also called lottocracy. The system was proposed by the writer Roger de Sizif in 1998 in his book La Stochocratie. Choosing officeholders by lot was also the standard practice in ancient Athenian democracy and in ancient India. The rationale behind this practice was to avoid lobbying and electioneering by economic oligarchs.

The system of deliberative democracy is a mix between a majority-ruled system and a consensus-based system. It allows for representative democracies or direct democracies to coexist with its system of governance, providing an initial advantage.

== See also ==
- Democracy
- Political representation
- Proportional representation
- Voir dire
