= Franz Melnitzky =

Austrian sculptor

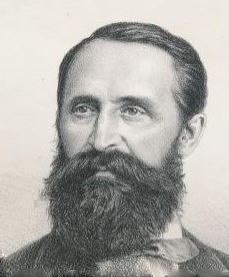
Franz Melnitzky (1867); by Josef Marastoni

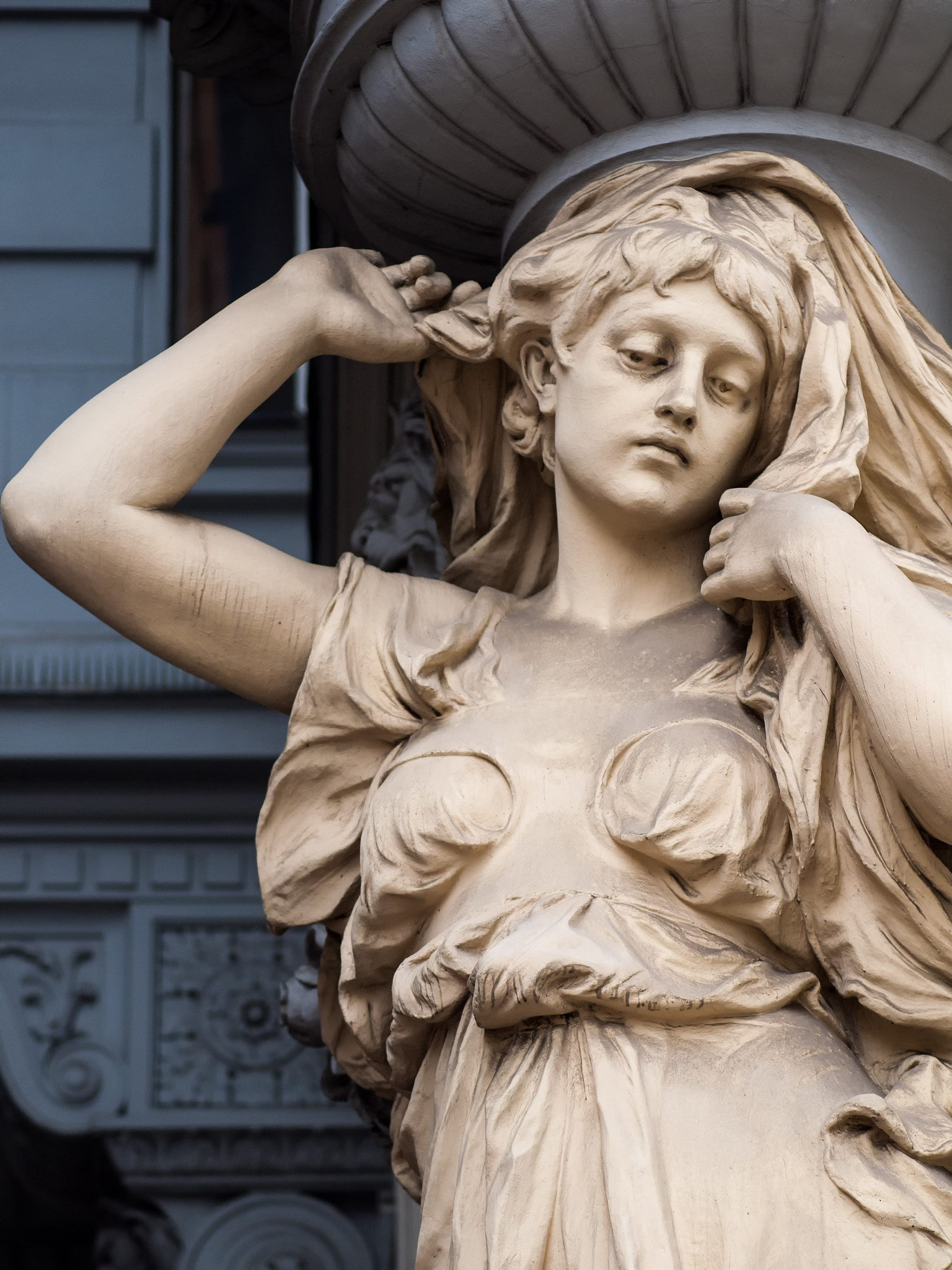
A caryatid at Tuchlauben 1, Vienna

Franz Melnitzky (13 November 1822 – 1 February 1876) was an Austrian sculptor.

== Life and work ==
Franz Melnitzky was born on 13 November 1822 in Vamberk, Bohemia, Austrian Empire (Czech Republic). His father was a stonemason, and he was originally trained for the same profession. After deciding to become a sculptor, he went to study in Olomouc, but was dissatisfied there, so he moved to Vienna. His application to the Academy of Fine Arts was rejected, but he was able to take private lessons from Josef Klieber. In 1851, he took a study trip through Germany. A planned trip to Italy never materialized, due to passport issues. When he returned, after a brief period with Hanns Gasser, he set up his own studio.

He soon received several large commissions, including a monument to Henry II, Duke of Austria, for the Elisabethbrücke (now at the Rathausplatz), and sculptures for the Aspernbrücke, symbolizing war, peace, fame and prosperity. They were destroyed in 1945, during World War II. He also created four allegorical figures directly above the entrance to what is now the Hotel Imperial, representing wisdom, honor, justice and strength.

For the new building of the Musikvereins, he created a front panel depicting Orpheus in the Underworld and, for the Roman Baths in Praterstern, he provided the entrance portal. It was lost when the building was converted to corporate offices in 1955, following the Soviet occupation.

He created another series of allegorical figures for the Nordwestbahnhof, on the departure side, symbolizing cities served by the Austrian Northwestern Railway. This building fell victim to urban development and was demolished in 2015. He also made several statues for the high altar at the Pfarrkirche St. Othmar unter den Weißgerbern in the Landstraße district.

One of his best known students was Karl Costenoble.

He died on 1 February 1876 in Vienna.

== Sources ==
- Constantin von Wurzbach: "Melnitzky, Franz." In: Biographisches Lexikon des Kaiserthums Oesterreich (Biographical Lexicon of the Empire of Austria). Part 17 Kaiserlich-königliche Hof- und Staatsdruckerei, Vienna 1867, p. 333–335 (digitalised).
- Felix Czeike, Historisches Lexikon Wien. Vols.1–5, Kremayr & Scheriau, Wien 1992–2004 ISBN 3-218-00748-8
- F. Melnitzky, Römisches Grab bei Schwannenstadt. In: Mitteilungen der K. K. Central-Commission zur Erforschung und Erhaltung der Baudenkmale f. Bd. 1883, S. CLVII, Mosaikboden zu Weyregg, ib. S. CLVII.
- Joachim Reiber, "Orpheus in der Oberwelt. Ein Mythos unter dem Dach des Musikvereins", In: Musikverein (magazine), November 2004.
