= Joseph Gasser von Valhorn =

Austrian sculptor (1816–1900)

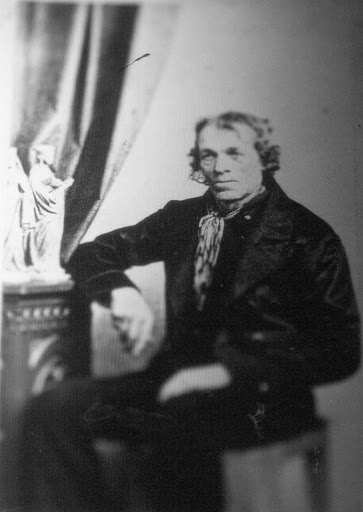
Joseph Gasser (date unknown)

Joseph Gasser, known after 1879 asRitter von Valhorn (22 November 1816, Wallhorn, near Prägraten – 28 October 1900, Prägraten), was an Austrian sculptor.

== Life and work ==
His father, Jakob, was a Master carpenter. His younger brother, Hans, also became a sculptor. He originally studied wood carving at home, then went to Vienna where, in 1837, he enrolled at the Academy of Fine Arts. His instructors there included Johann Nepomuk Schaller and Josef Klieber. He made his debut with a statuette of Leopold VI, Duke of Austria ("The Glorious"), which brought him a scholarship to study in Rome. He was there from 1845 to 1849, acquainting himself with the sculptures of antiquity.

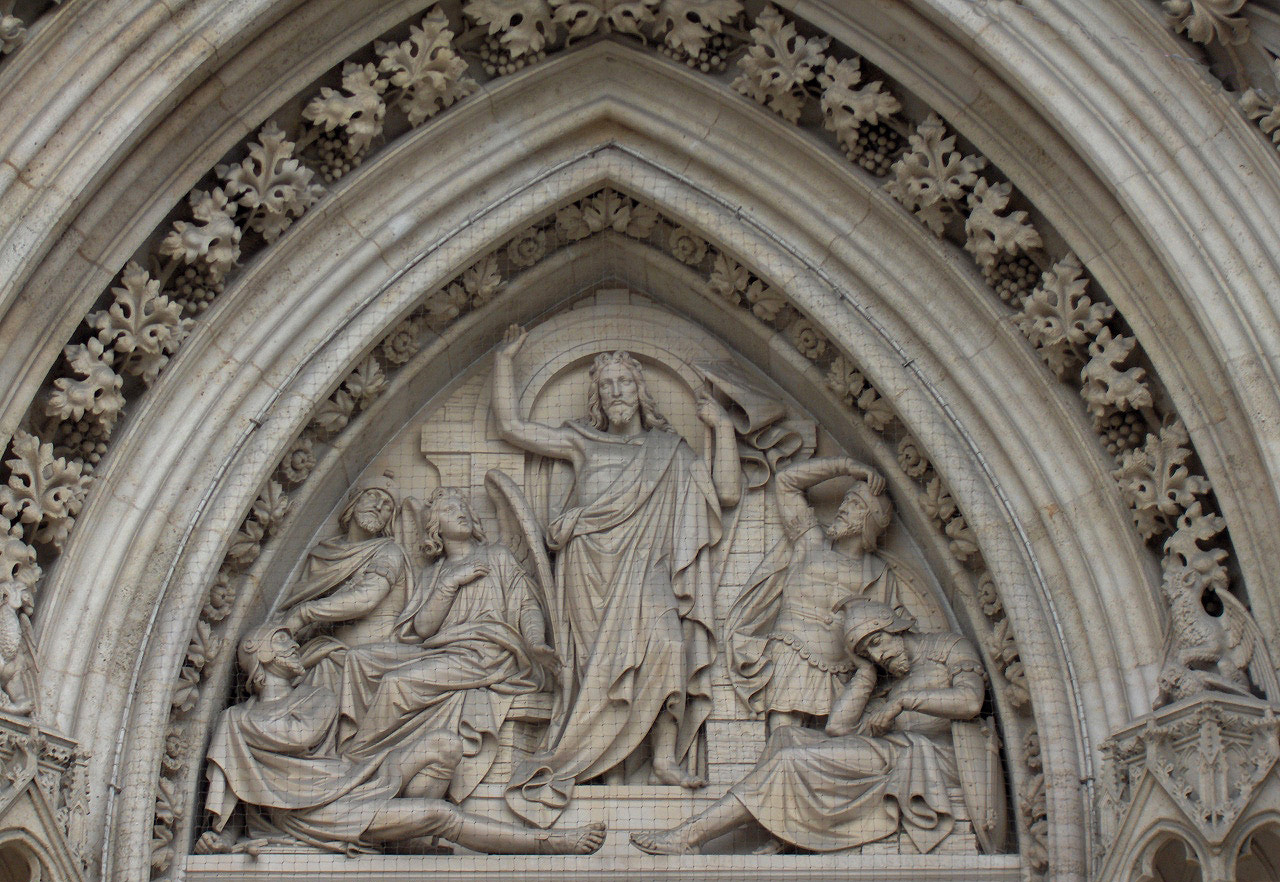
Tympanum, right portal, Votivkirche, Vienna, circa 1873

His health began to decline during this period, and he would have depression for the rest of his life. He initially returned to his hometown, and did not go back to Vienna until 1852. Shortly after, he created five statues for the portal at Speyer Cathedral.

After making busts of Emperor Maximilian of Mexico and his wife, Charlotte of Belgium, he developed a large clientele among the nobility. His next order was for six statues at the palace of Archudke Ludwig Victor.

He taught at the Vienna Academy from 1865 to 1873. His most famous student there was Viktor Oskar Tilgner. He was raised to the Knighthood in 1879, following his work at the Votivkirche. After that, his commissions decreased, as his style were becoming "out of date". He eventually had to be rescued from poverty by a pension from the City of Vienna. After 1896, he lived in his hometown, poor and almost forgotten.

His works include life-size statues of Maximilian I, Holy Roman Emperor, and Frederick II, Duke of Austria, for the "k.u.k. Hofwaffenmuseum" (now the Museum of Military History), and statues symbolizing the Seven Liberal Arts at the State Opera. He also created a statue of Rudolf IV, Duke of Austria; originally on the Elisabethbrücke, now at the Karlsplatz. His best known work is a cover plate for the marble sarcophagus of Klemens Maria Hofbauer at Maria am Gestade.

== Selected sculptures ==
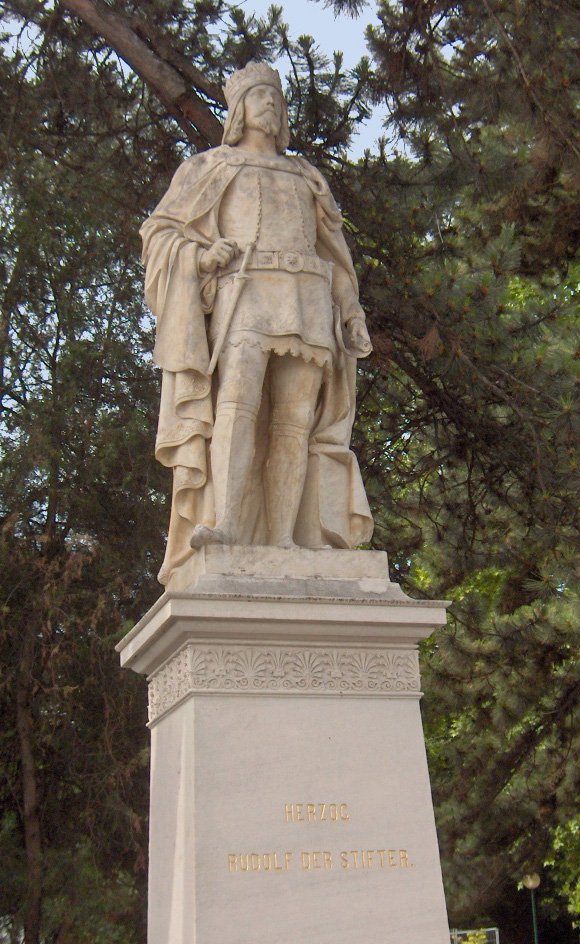
Rudolf IV, originally on the Elizabeth Bridge, Vienna

Gasser's work includes:

- Five heroic figures for the portal of Speyer Cathedral: Our Lady, the Archangel St. Michael, St. John the Baptist, St. Stephen and St. Bernard of Clairvaux (1856)
- The tomb of Clemens Maria Hofbauer, patron saint of Vienna, at the Maria am Gestade (1862)
- Exterior figures for the Palais Archduke Ludwig Viktor, on the Ringstrasse (1866)
- Statues of Maximilian I, Frederick II, Duke of Austria, and Leopold of Habsburg for the Museum of the Arsenal (1870)
- A sculptural program for the Votive Church, Vienna: the Coronation of Mary, the group of the Trinity, a figure of Christ the Redeemer, statues for the high and side altars, nine angels, and the tympany reliefs tor the three main portals (c. 1873)
- Seven reliefs for the Kaiserhalle, Speyer
- The marble statue of Rudolf IV on the Elizabeth bridge over the Danube Canal, Vienna, one of the eight statues now relocated to the grounds of the Rathaus, Vienna
- Busts and religious figures for St. Stephen's Cathedral, Vienna
- Marble figures of the Seven Liberal Arts in the staircase of the Vienna State Opera
- Twenty-four figures for St. Stephen's Cathedral, Vienna
- The relief of Duke Rudolf IV for the New Townhall
- The "Prometheus" and the "Genevieve" for the Court Theatre
- A number of statues for the Altlerchenfelder Church
- Busts of Herodotus and Aristarchus for the university
- Portraits of Maximilian I of Mexico and his wife the Empress Charlotte
- A bust of the Emperor Franz Joseph I for the Hôtel de Ville, Paris
- Sculptures for the New Cathedral, Linz
- Exterior figures along the cornice of the Deutschmeister-Palais
