= Hans Gasser =

Austrian painter and sculptor

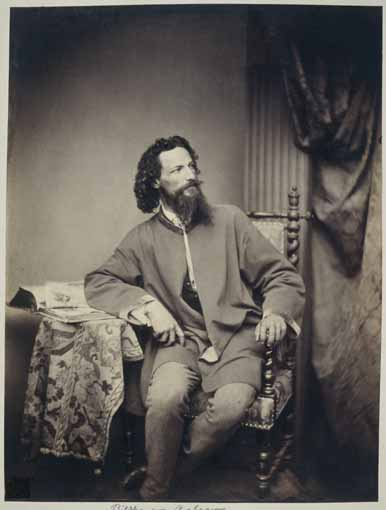
- Photograph by Franz Hanfstaengl
- Born: 2 October 1817; Krems, Austrian Empire
- Died: 24 April 1868 (aged 50); Budapest, Austria-Hungary

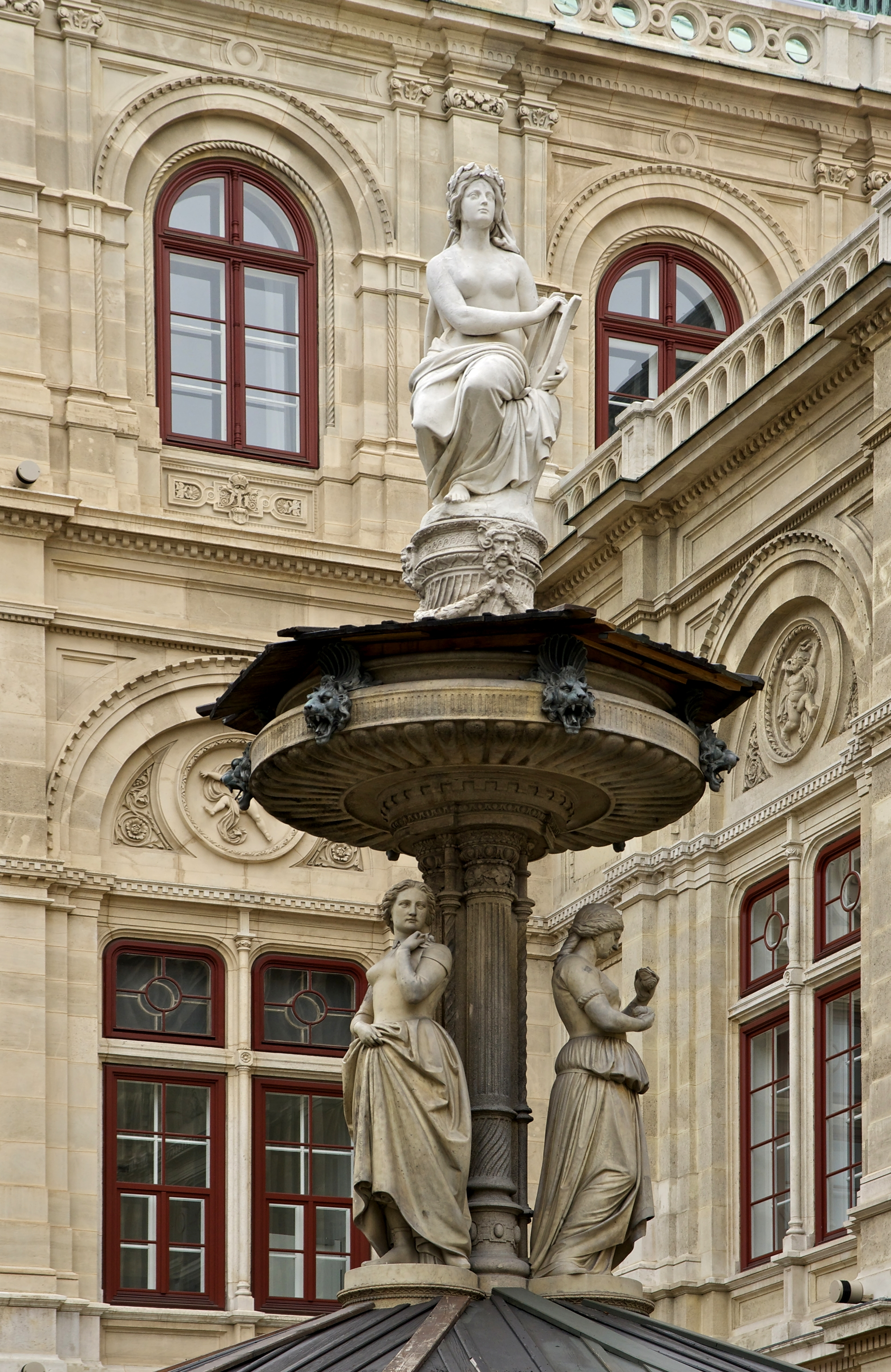
Fountain at the Vienna State Opera

Hans Gasser (2 October 1817 – 24 April 1868) was an Austrian painter and sculptor. His name is sometimes spelled Hanns, and he was baptized as Johann. He shortened his name to avoid confusion with a now-forgotten Tyrolean artist who was also named Johann Gasser.

== Life and work ==
His father, Jakob, was a Master carpenter. His older brother, Joseph, also became a sculptor. He was originally a wood carver in Klagenfurt then, in 1838, thanks to the patronage of a local nobleman, he was able to go to Vienna, where he enrolled at the Academy of Fine Arts. His first studies were with the painter, Karl Gsellhofer. Later, he switched to sculpture, under the tutelage of Josef Klieber and Joseph Käßmann (1784–1856). During his time there, he was awarded several prizes. From 1842 to 1846, he lived in Munich, where he worked with Julius Schnorr von Carolsfeld, Wilhelm von Kaulbach and Ludwig Schwanthaler. Most of his commissions came from private parties.

In 1848, he took part in the Revolutions of 1848. For a short period, from 1850 to 1851, he was a professor at the Vienna Academy, but he disliked teaching and resigned. This was followed by many unsettled years of wandering, during which he worked on commissions, public and private, in numerous European cities. Many were executed quickly, and some critics believe they were done carelessly as well.

Eventually, he possessed enough wealth to buy a house with a garden in Vienna's Margareten district. There, he built an expensive studio in medieval style. He also began collecting various artifacts; including cabinets, Limoges enamels, carpets, embroidery, metal, glass, and copper engravings. They were piled up in complete disorder, together with junk; making him what would now be called a "hoarder". Although he showed great moderation when it came to his physical needs, this obsessive collecting led to his financial situation becoming comparably disordered. Deeply in debt, he was rescued by a group of art lovers who ordered his affairs and sold the largest part of his property. After that, he returned to collecting, in a more organized manner. Upon his death, 397 art objects of his own creation and 834 assorted works of art were auctioned off. Some were acquired by public collections.

A street in Vienna was named in his honor in 1875. A class kkStB 151 steam engine was also named after him, presumably in recognition of his constant travelling. There is a "Hanns-Gasser-Platz" in Villach.
