= Tibor Grasser =

Tibor Grasser (born 28 April 1970 in Vienna) is an electrical engineer and full professor at the Vienna University of Technology (German: Technische Universität Wien, for short TU Wien) in Vienna, Austria. Since 2016 he heads the Institute for Microelectronics at that University. Grasser's research interests are focused on numerical simulation of solid-state devices and integrated circuits. For contributions to the modeling of the reliability of semiconductor devices, he was named a Fellow of the Institute of Electrical and Electronics Engineers (IEEE) in 2016.

His professional biography is almost entirely bound to the TU Wien. There he studied electrical engineering and, in 1999, earned the PhD degree with honors. In 1996, he has been recruited as a staff member to the Institute for Microelectronics at the TU Wien. That time, a leader of the institute was Siegfried Selberherr – whose position Grasser took two decades later. Presently, beyond administrative functioning, Grasser is a professor of microelectronics specializing in simulation aspects and reliability issues. His current work involves theoretical modeling of performance of 2D and 3D devices, starting from the ab initio level over more efficient quantum-mechanical descriptions up to TCAD modeling.

The number of publications co-authorized by Grasser exceeds 700, the h-index is 49 (as of 2020). He is a distinguished lecturer of the IEEE EDS, a recipient of the Best Paper Awards at several top-level scientific fora and of the IEEE EDS Paul Rappaport Award (2011). He serves/served as an associate editor for the IEEE Transactions on Electron Devices and Microelectronics Reliability (Elsevier) and is involved in organization of various outstanding conferences such as IEDM.

Grasser was also known as a half-professional musician. After ten years of classical piano lessons in Vienna he turned to the boogie-woogie style and, in the mid 1990s, participated in several public recitals as a boogie ensemble member, also on Austrian TV; there appeared two CDs. However later he devoted himself almost exclusively to the scientific research.
