= Deutschmeister-Palais =

Palace in Vienna, Austria

Coordinates: 48.2062°N 16.3788°E

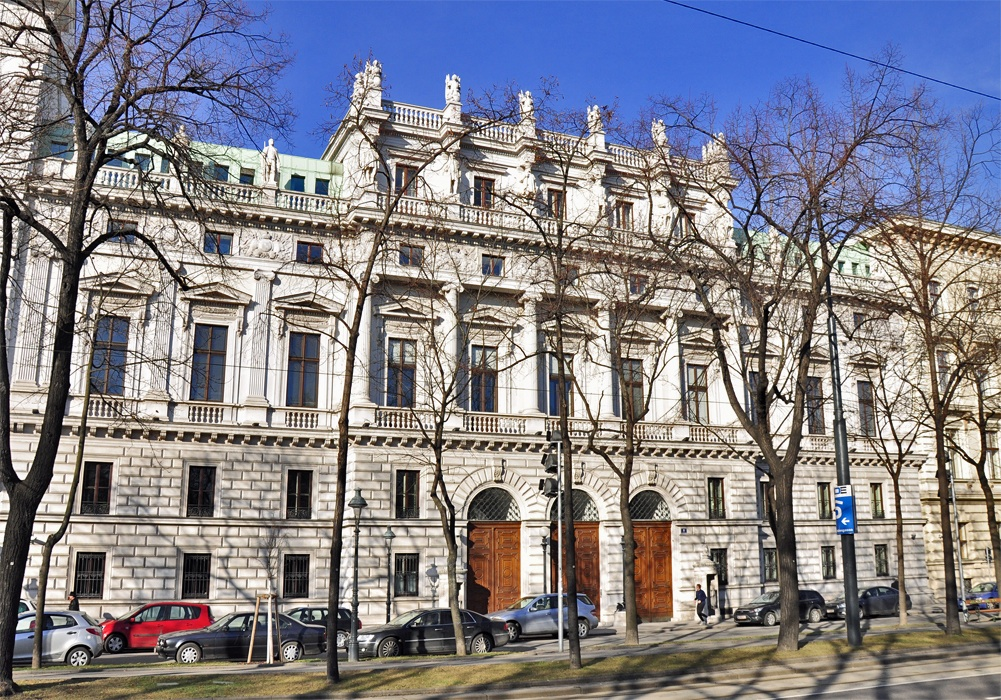
Palais Erzherzog Wilhelm

The Deutschmeister-Palais or Palais Erzherzog Wilhelm is a building in Vienna located at Parkring 8.

It was designed in the years 1864–1868 by the Danish-Austrian architect Theophil von Hansen (1813–1891) as a residence for Archduke Wilhelm Franz of Austria (1827–1894), who at that time was Grand Master of the Teutonic Knights (Deutschmeister). The facade of the building includes statues by the Austrian sculptor Joseph Gasser von Valhorn.

From 1938 to 1945 it was the seat of the Viennese SS headquarters, then from 1945 to 1974 it served as the Federal Police Department in Vienna. Today it holds the offices of the OPEC Fund for International Development.
