= Convective momentum transport =

Convective momentum transport describes a vertical flux of the momentum of horizontal winds or currents. This momentum is carried like a non-conserved flow tracer by vertical air motions in convection.

According to Romps, convective momentum transport in the atmosphere can be understood through 2 mechanisms:

- Convective entrainment and detrainment
- Accelerations by the pressure gradient force

The net effect of these interacting mechanisms depends on the detailed configuration or 'organization' of the convective cloud or storm system.

== See also ==
- Momentum
- Convective organization
