= Georg Grasser =

Austrian footballer

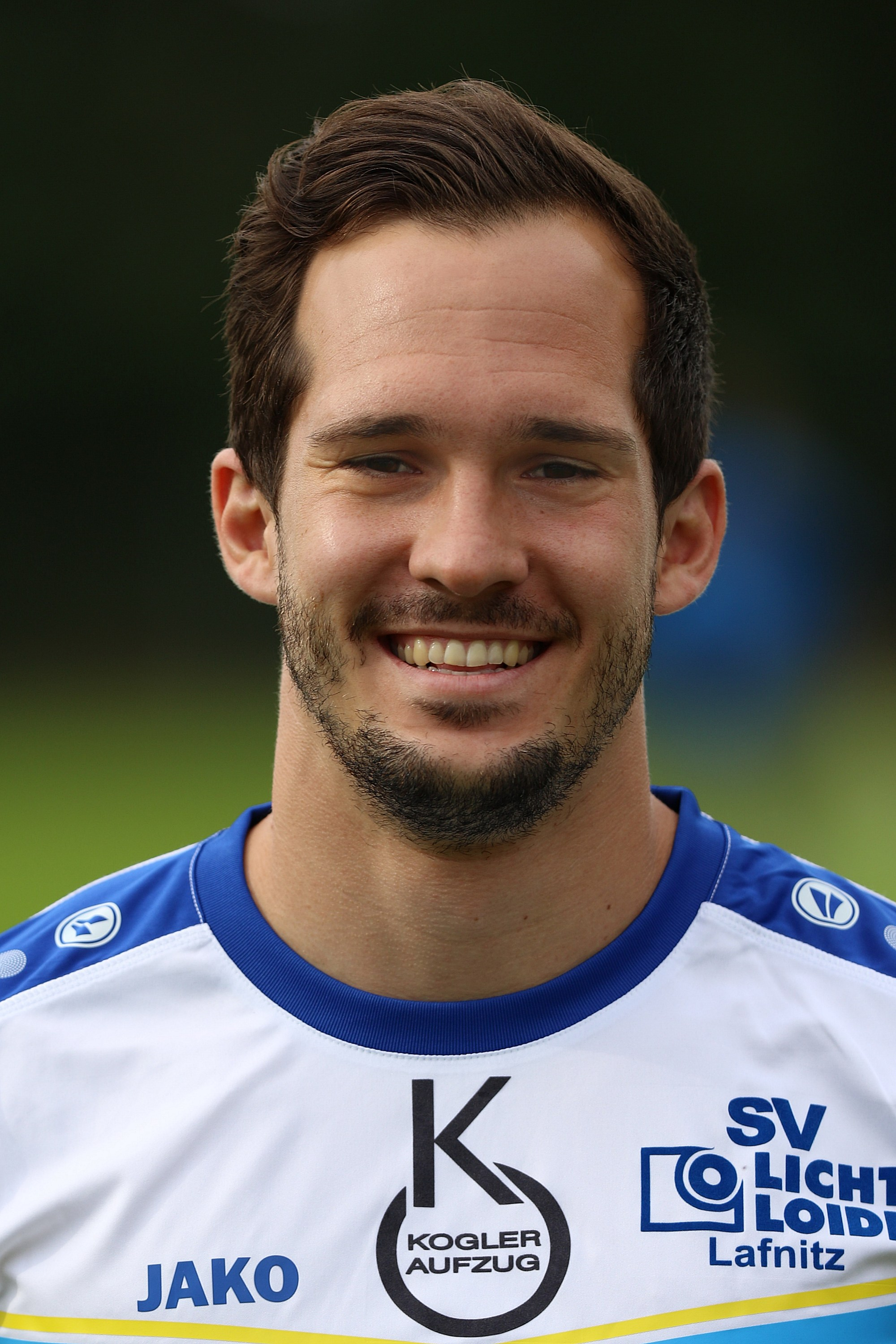

Personal information
- Date of birth: 3 October 1990 (age 36)
- Place of birth: Austria
- Height: 1.83 m (6 ft 0 in)
- Position: Defender

Team information
- Current team: Lafnitz

Youth career
- –2008: GAK
- 2008–2010: West Ham United

Senior career*
| Years | Team | Apps | (Gls) |
| 2010–2011 | GAK | 21 | (0) |
| 2011–2012 | Leoben | 25 | (1) |
| 2012–2014 | Allerheiligen | 56 | (6) |
| 2014–2015 | Weiz | 26 | (2) |
| 2015– | Lafnitz | 129 | (3) |
- * Club domestic league appearances and goals as of 21:25, 20 July 2021 (UTC)

Georg Grasser (born 3 October 1990) is an Austrian footballer who plays as a defender for Lafnitz.

== Career ==
In 2008, Grasser signed for the reserves of English Premier League side West Ham United, where he said, "The transition was very tough for me at the beginning because I wasn't physically at the same level as the other players." In 2015, he signed for GAK in the Austrian third division, helping them achieve promotion to the Austrian second division.
