= Gravity laser =

Hypothetical gravitron emission device

A gravity laser, also sometimes referred to as a gaser, graser, or glaser, is a hypothetical device for stimulated emission of coherent gravitational radiation or gravitons, much in the same way that a standard laser produces coherent electromagnetic radiation.

== Principle of function ==
While photons exist as excitations of a vector potential and so contain an oscillating dipole term, gravitons are a spin-2 field and so have an oscillating quadrupole term. For efficient lasing to occur, there are several conditions that must be met:

1. There must be particles in an excited state capable of emitting radiation at the desired frequency. In a normal laser, these would be valence electrons in an excited state. For a gaser, the more straightforward analog would be a binary system of massive bodies.
2. These particles must couple to supplied radiation, in order to provide stimulated emission. This could be possible in a gaser by a stimulated analog of the Penrose process.
3. The particles must be in an inverted population, where more are in the excited state than the ground state. This typically requires some type of pumping, such as optical pumping.
4. The lasing medium must be long enough for the radiation to persist and excite more of the same. In optical systems this can typically be created by mirrors, effectively making a larger optical path length. For a gaser, a large-scale, slowly spatially varying gravitational potential could act as a mirror (by the WKB approximation). Alternately, a hypothetical gaser could simply be built with sufficient length to begin with.

Alternate design proposals involve free undulators akin to a free-electron laser. Several proposals involve exploiting the momentum transport properties of superconductors, where s-waves and d-waves couple distinctly to gravitational radiation.

As of 2024, interest in gravity lasers has begun to enter research.

== Use in science fiction ==
The idea of gravity lasers has been popularized by science fiction works such as David Brin's Earth (1990). While attempting to remove micro singularities inadvertently introduced into the planetary mantle, it is found they can serve as mirrors. With the necessary energy levels found in gravitational potentials of the planet's core and mantle, the resulting 'graser' beams are initially employed to nudge the singularities somewhere safer. Other uses are soon found, such as propelling objects into space and for weaponry of various levels of sophistication.

Other works, such as the RPG Star Ocean (1996) use them as a hypothetical weapon. They are also commonly employed as a proposed mechanism for tractor beams, antigravity, and space propulsion.

In Alastair Reynolds' novel Redemption Ark (2002), a graser is utilised by the Inhibitors to bore into, and puncture, Resurgam's sun.

In the television series Justice League (2001–2004), the Thanagarian military uses a type of gravity laser to paralyze the Flash.

The novel Earth Unaware (2012) uses 'glasers' as a plot device to enable planetary-scale manipulation of matter, akin to gravity guns.

== See also ==
- Gamma-ray laser
