= IFA Tulln =

Austrian research institute

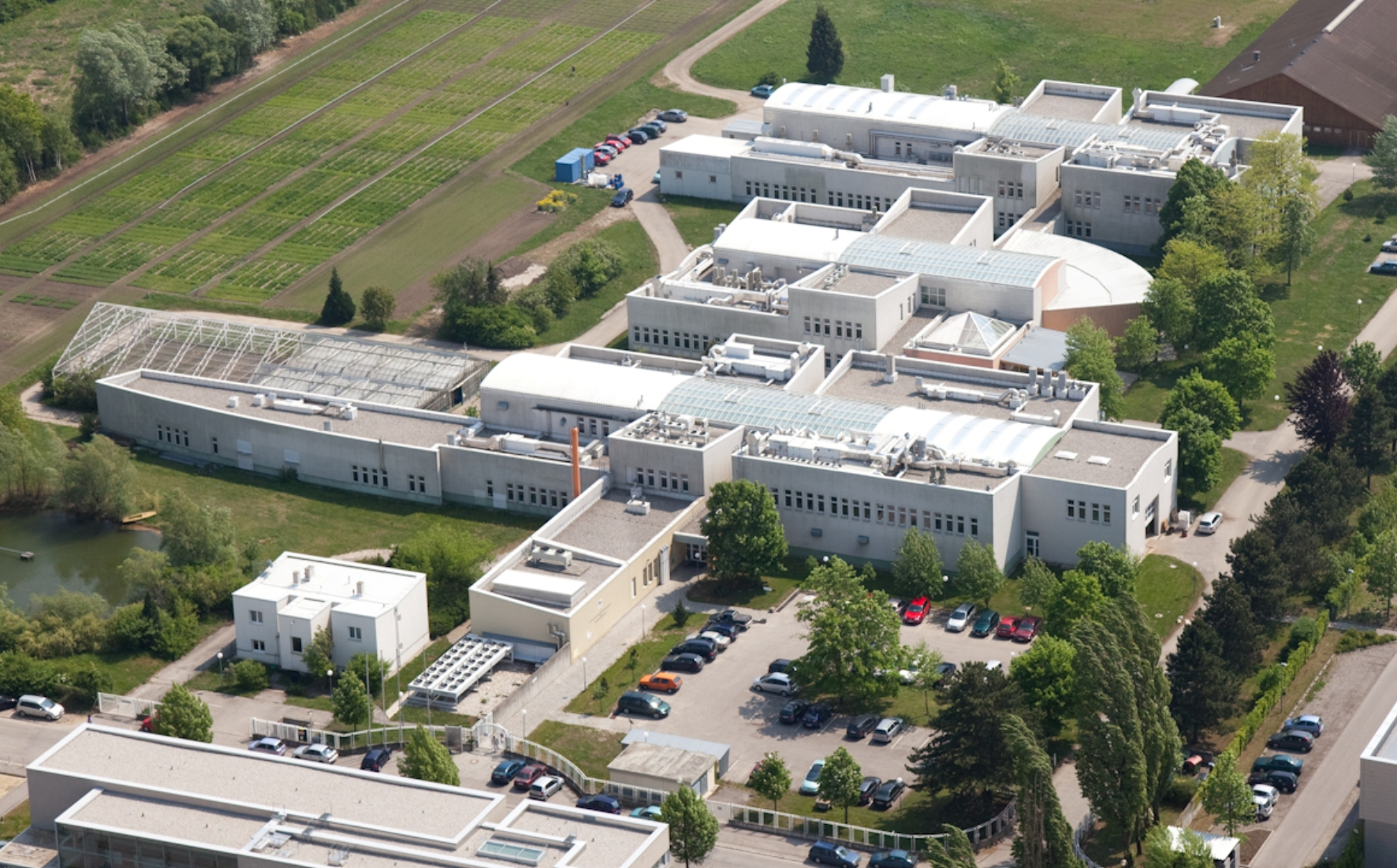
Aerial view of the IFA–Tulln Department of Agrobiotechnology

The Department of Agrobiotechnology (IFA-Tulln) is one of the 15 departments of the University of Natural Resources and Life Sciences, Vienna (BOKU) operated in cooperation with the Vienna University of Technology and the University of Veterinary Medicine Vienna at the Campus Tulln Technopol.

== History ==
The IFA-Tulln was founded in 1994 as a joint research institution of three major universities in Vienna, the University of Veterinary Medicine Vienna (VetMed), the University of Technology Vienna (TUW) and the University of Natural Resources and Life Sciences Vienna (BOKU). The idea has been to enable the collaboration of scientists with complementary background in the interdisciplinary area of agrobiotechnology under one roof. Their expertise covers modern biotechnology in plant and animal production, environmental biotechnology, animal nutrition, food- and feed science and (bio) analytics and biopolymers. Today about 150 BOKU employees, guest scientists and students are working in 6 institutes at the IFA-Tulln which has become a department of the BOKU in 2004.

== Organisation ==
IFA-Tulln, which is a department of the University of Natural Resources and Life Sciences Vienna (BOKU), was founded in 1994 as a joint research institution of the BOKU, the University of Veterinary Medicine Vienna and the Vienna University of Technology to enable the collaboration of scientists with complementary background in the interdisciplinary area of agrobiotechnology.

The department is organised into 6 institutes:

- Institute of Biotechnology in Plant Production
- Institute of Bioanalytics and Agro-Metabolomics
- Institute of Environmental Biotechnology
- Institute of Animal Nutrition, Products and Nutrition Physiology

== Location ==
The first 3 Institutes of the department IFA-Tulln are located in the IFA-Tulln building in Tulln an der Donau on the Campus Tulln Technopol. The 4th Institute (Institute of Animal Nutrition, Products and Nutrition Physiology) is located in Muthgasse, Vienna. The IFA-Tulln building, together with the other working groups of BOKU in the UFT-building (University Research Center Tulln), is forming the “BOKU location Tulln”. Campus Tulln Technopol is part of Technopol Tulln which was founded in 2006 by Ecoplus. Further partners of Technopol Tulln besides BOKU, are: AIT Austrian Institute of Technology, Technopark Tulln GmbH, Technologiezentrum Tulln GmbH, Agrana Research & Innovation Center, University for Applied Sciences Wiener Neustadt Campus Tulln and the city of Tulln.

== Institutes at the Department IFA-Tulln ==
=== Institute of Biotechnology in Plant Production ===
In its research, the Institute for Biotechnology in Plant Production focuses on basic and applied research in the areas plant breeding, plant genetics and phytopathology. The logical overlaps between these topics are plant-pathogen interaction, genetics of disease resistance and breeding research for disease resistance. The institute almost exclusively performs its own research work on agricultural crop plants.

=== Institute of Bioanalytics and Agro-Metabolomics ===
The Institute of Bioanalytics and Agro-Metabolomics (iBAM) aims to perform scientific research and to develop methods in the field of (bio)analytical chemistry. The CAC with its two Christian Doppler Laboratories is pursuing an interdisciplinary approach for the determination of chemical contaminants including mycotoxins and allergenic proteins in food. By employing metabolomics based approaches the CAC studies entire biological systems with a special emphasis on plant-fungi interactions.

There are five research groups within the Institute:

- Metabolomics and Bioactive Substances
- Mycotoxins and Mycotoxin Metabolism
- Immunoanalytics and Food Allergens
- Water Analysis and Quality Assurance Systems
- Molecular Diagnostics

=== Institute for Environmental Biotechnology ===
Focus of research activities at the Institute for Environmental Biotechnology is given to the application of microbial metabolism to safeguard the quality of life and preserve natural resources. On the one hand, emphasis is put on degradation or detoxification of pollutants (in soil, water and waste) or the development of monitoring methods to evaluate the success of restoration technologies. On the other hand, the best possible utilization of existing resources by establishment of sustainable material cycles is the central aim of research conducted. Practical application and process development for technical implementation are a primary concern independent from fundamental investigation of the underlying microbiological activities. Examples are the scale up of fermentation processes, the development of technical remediation methods and the testing of innovative combined biological-physical processes (e.g. use of membrane bioprocesses) in environmental technology.

There are 6 research groups established at the Institute for Environmental Biotechnology:

- Anaerobic digestion (biogas)
- Contaminated land management
- Feed additives
- Fermentation and pilot plant
- Microbiology (incl. molecular biology) and
- Water and wastewater treatment

=== Institute of Animal Nutrition, Products and Nutrition Physiology ===
The Institute of Animal Nutrition, Products, and Nutrition Physiology (APN) represents the start of the supply chain of food of animal origin. It focuses on adequate feeding of agricultural livestock and the significant impact of animal nutrition on quality and safety of primary products, such as milk, meat and eggs. Aside from nutrients, special emphasis is paid on secondary effects of feed and feed/food components on digestion, metabolism and health.

The Institute has condensed its mission and structure towards three intrinsic topics:

- animal nutrition
- animal products
- nutrition physiology

== Sources ==
- Website of Dept. IFA-Tulln:https://boku.ac.at/ifa-tulln
- IFA-Tulln YouTube Channel: https://www.youtube.com/user/ifatulln?ob=5
- Knowledge Survey of BOKU 2010

http://www.boku.ac.at/fileadmin/_/H13/Publikationen/Wissensbilanzen/Wissensbilanz_2010/BOKU_Wissensbilanz_2010.pdf

- Knowledge Survey of BOKU 2009: http://www.boku.ac.at/fileadmin/_/mitteilungsblatt/MB_2009_10/MB19/BO_WB_2009_SCREEN.pdf
- BOKU Research Database at BOKU: https://forschung.boku.ac.at/fis/suchen.orgeinheit_suchergebnis?sprache_in=de&menue_id_in=200&suchbegriff_in=H97&suchfeld_in=orgeinheit
- Campus Tulln Technopol: www.technopol-tulln.at
- Website of University for Natural Resources and Life Sciences, Vienna (BOKU): www.boku.ac.at
- Website of the Technical University Vienna (TUW): www.tuwien.ac.at
- University of Veterinary Medicine, Vienna (Vetmeduni Vienna): www.vu-wien.ac.at
