= Adolf Gasser =

Swiss historian

Adolf Gasser (1903–1985) was a Swiss historian.

== Education ==
Gasser completed his studies in Heidelberg and Zurich with doctorates in history and classical philology.

== Career ==
From 1928 to 1969 Gasser taught as a grammar school teacher in Basel. In the course of Gasser's lectureships he became private lecturer in 1936 and an adjunct professor in 1942; from 1950 to 1985 he taught as an extraordinary professor for constitutional history at the University of Basel. After World War II Gasser started an active lecturing activity in the Federal Republic of Germany. Gasser was joint founder of the Council of European Municipalities and Regions, from 1953 to 1968 Gasser was a Liberal member of the Grand Council of Basel, and he was a president of the FDP of the canton Basel.

== Works ==
His works include (published in German language, all titles are translated here for better understanding):

- The territorial development of Switzerland. Confederation 1291–1797, 1932
- History of the People’s Freedom and Democracy, 1939
- Communal freedom as salvation of Europe, 1943
- On the foundations of the state, 1950
- Preussischer Militärgeist und Kriegsentfesselung 1914, 1985

=== Refutation of Robert Michels' Iron Law of Oligarchy ===
In his book Political Parties, written in 1911, Robert Michels argues that most representative systems deteriorate towards an oligarchy or particracy. This is known as the iron law of oligarchy. In his book "Gemeindefreiheit als Rettung Europas" which was published in 1943 (first edition in German) and a second edition in 1947 (in German), Adolf Gasser stated the following requirements for a representative democracy in order to remain stable, unaffected by the iron law of oligarchy:

- Society has to be built up from bottom to top. As a consequence, society is built up by people, who are free and have the power to defend themselves with weapons.
- These free people join or form local communities. These local communities are independent, which includes financial independence, and they are free to determine their own rules.
- Local communities join together into a higher unit e.g. a canton.
- There is no hierarchical bureaucracy.
- There is competition between these local communities e.g. on services delivered or on taxes.
