= Gräser =

Gräser or Graser is a surname. Notable people with the surname include:

- Franz Gräser (1892–1918), Hungarian World War I flying ace
- Fritz-Hubert Gräser (1888–1960), German military officer
- Gustav Gräser (1879–1958), German alternative lifestyle advocate, artist, and poet
- Hulda Regina Graser (1870–1943), Canadian-born American customs house broker
- Toni Gräser (1933–2022), Swiss racing cyclist
