= Josef Klieber =

Austrian painter and sculptor (1773–1850)

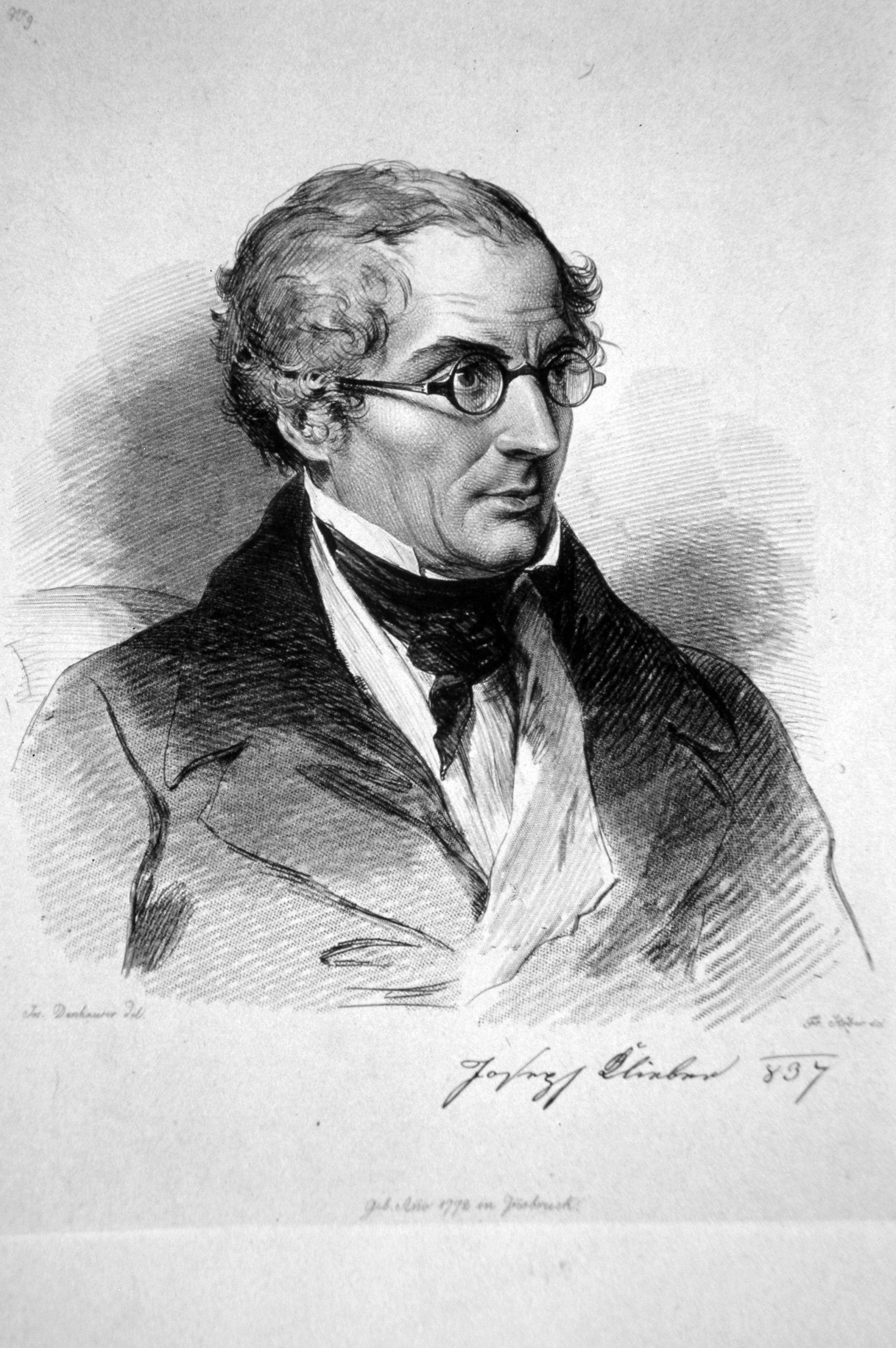
Joseph Klieber; etching by Franz Xaver Stöber (1837)

Josef Klieber (1 November 1773, Innsbruck - 11 January 1850, Vienna) was an Austrian painter and sculptor.

== Life and work ==
His father, Urban Klieber, was a church sculptor and gave him his first art lessons. In 1785, he began attending the drawing school in Innsbruck then, in 1792, went to Vienna with his father, hoping to find an apprenticeship. Their efforts failed, but Josef remained in Vienna. After a period of living in poverty, he was on the verge of enlisting in the army, when his father called him home to help with a project. Taking the money he earned there, he went back to Vienna and was able to obtain an apprenticeship with the sculptor, Jacob Schroth. He also learned metal casting from Johann Martin Fischer.

By 1810, he was working for Prince Johann I Joseph, for whom he produced a large number of sculptures, suitable for adorning his buildings in and around Vienna. Occasionally, he was engaged by the architect, Josef Kornhäusel, to provide decorative ornaments for his designs. He became well known through this work. As a result, he was appointed to the Privy Council and, in 1814, provisional Director of the engraving and metal cutting school at the Academy of Fine Arts. The following year, he was named permanent Director; a post he held until 1845. His students there included Franz Bauer, Anton Dietrich and István Ferenczy.

During his career, he received several awards, including the Great Gold Civil Medal. His preferred sculpting material was sandstone and his works were generally realistic in nature. He was known for working rapidly, which had a detrimental effect on some of his smaller sculptures.

He died in Vienna's Wieden district and was interred at the Wiener Zentralfriedhof. In 1879, a street and a park were named after him in Perchtoldsdorf.

His son, Eduard Klieber, was a painter and lithographer. The watercolorist and portrait painter, Carl Goebel, was his grandson.

== Selected works ==
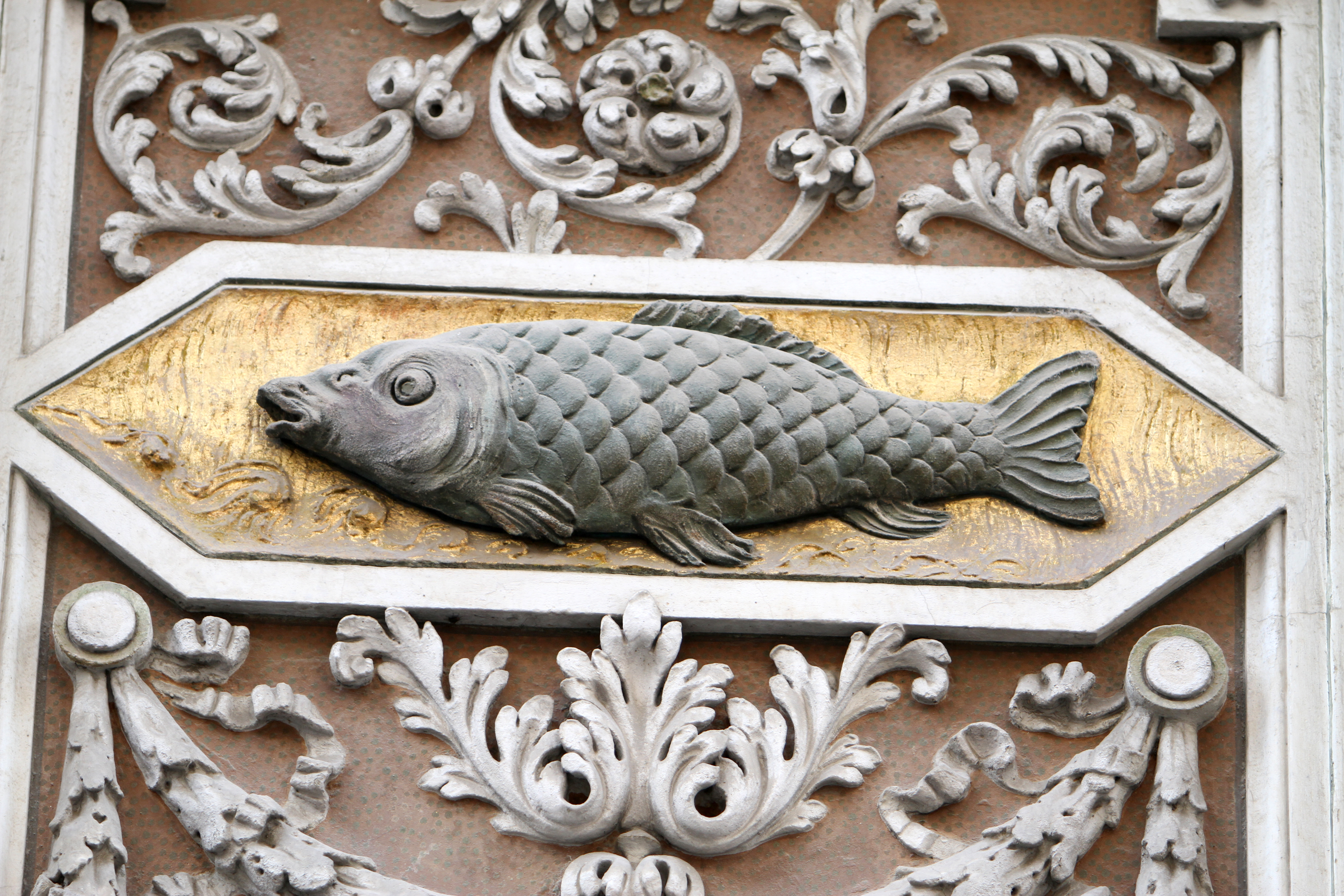
House of the Blue Carp (Annagasse)

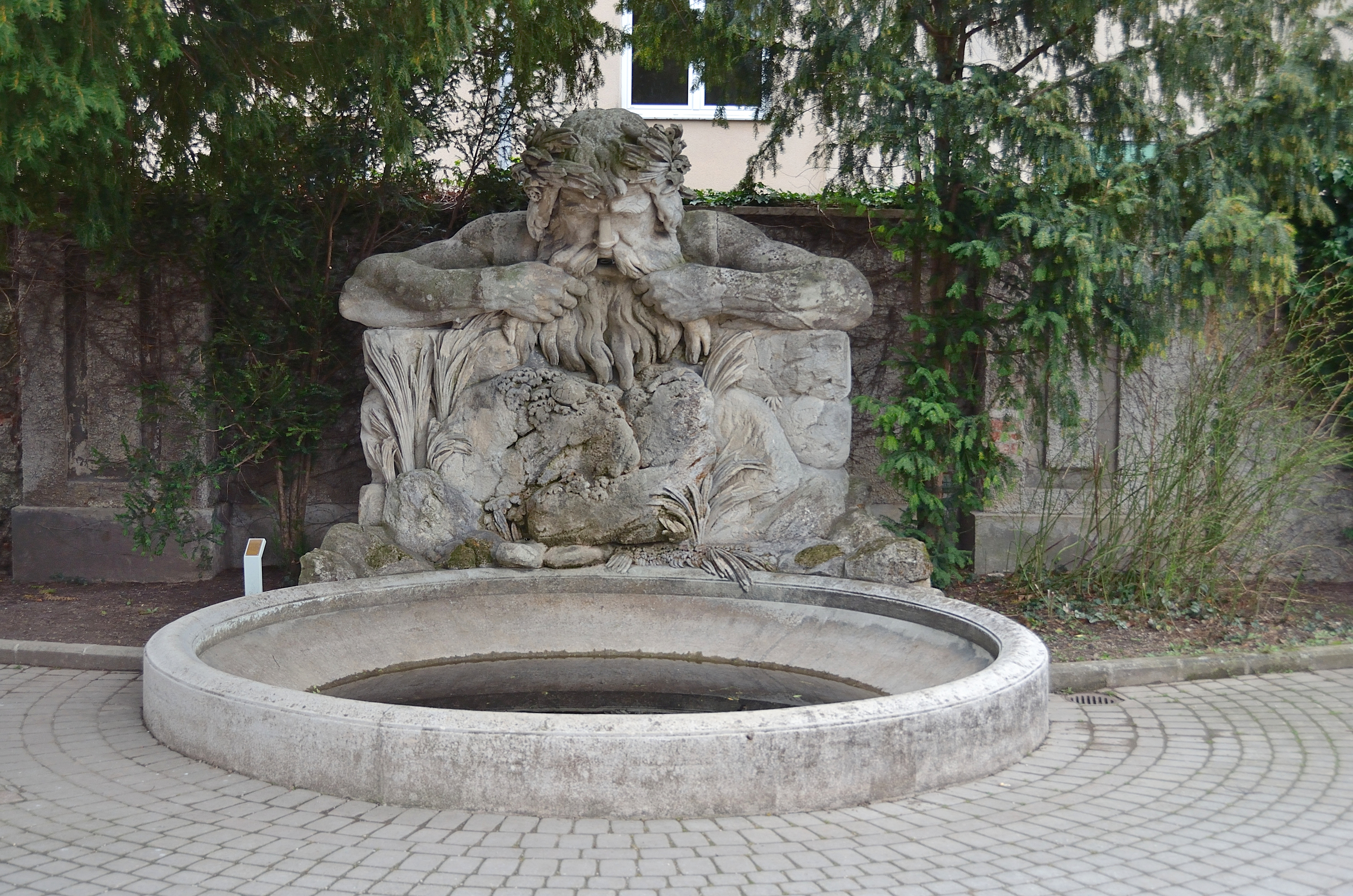
The River God Fountain in Baden

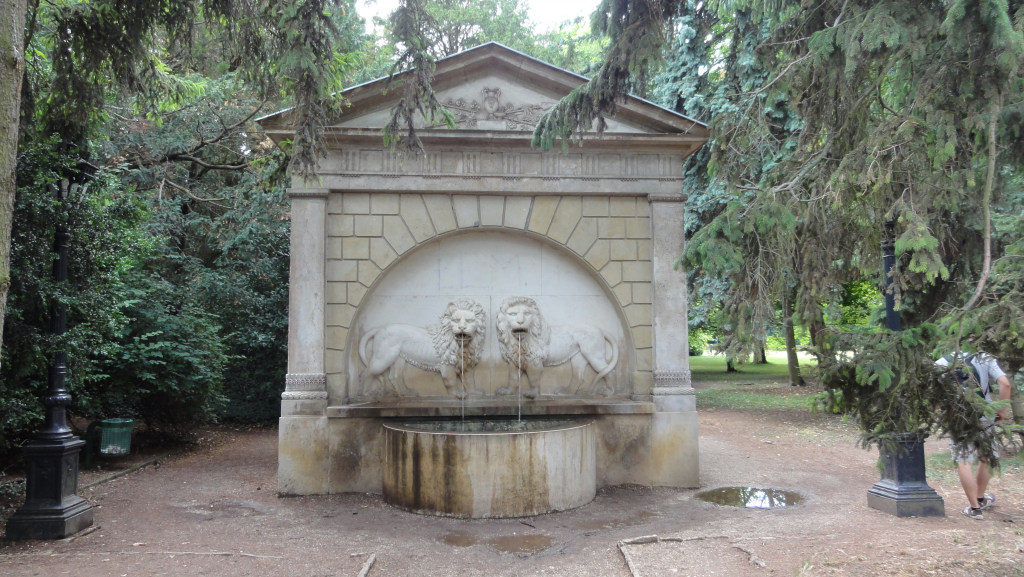
The Lion's Well in Keszthely

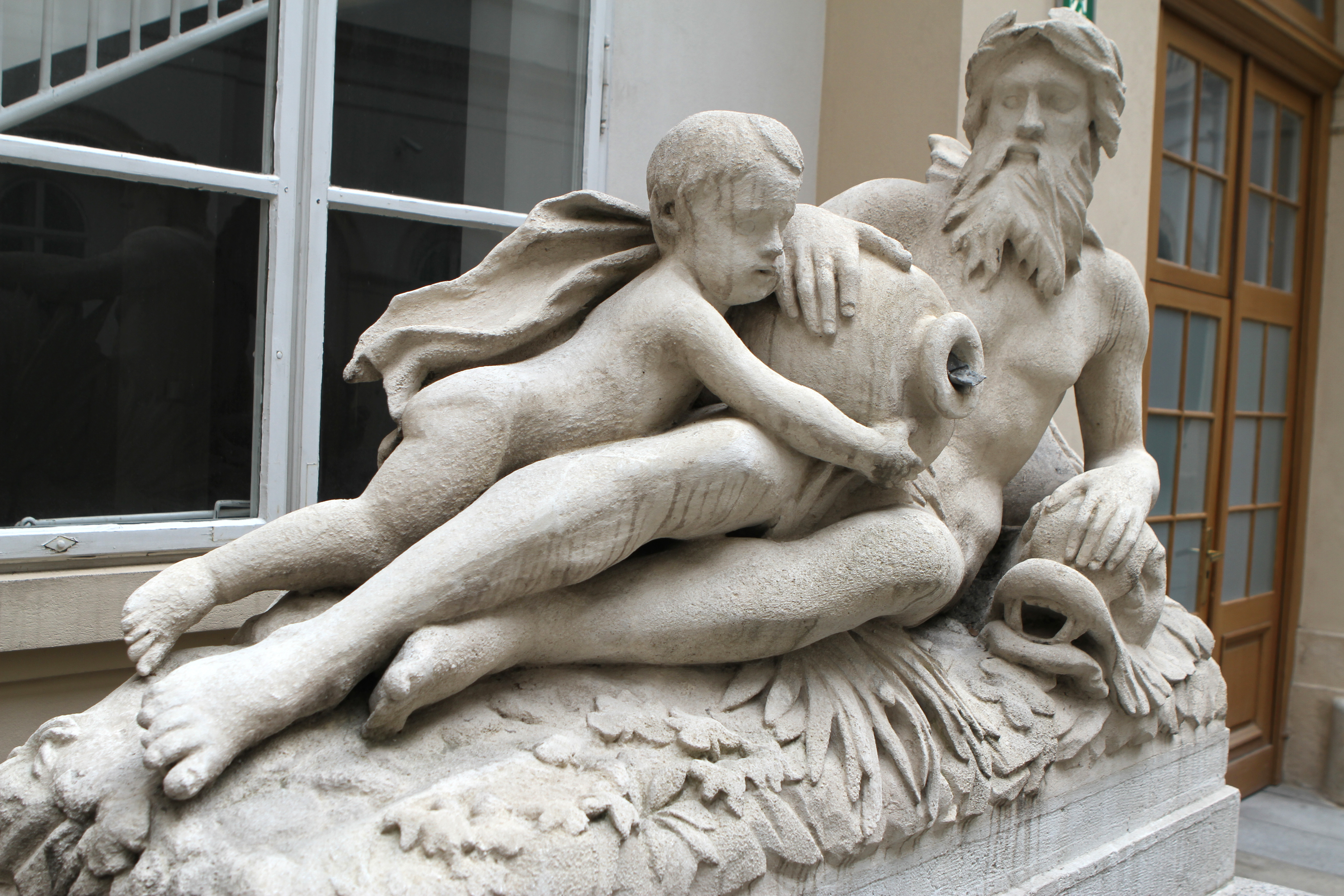
The Isterbrunnen (Danube Fountain), Altes Landhaus

== Sources ==
- Constantin von Wurzbach: "Klieber, Joseph." In: Biographisches Lexikon des Kaiserthums Oesterreich (Biographical Lexicon of the Empire of Austria). Part 12 Kaiserlich-königliche Hof- und Staatsdruckerei, Vienna 1864, p. 92–96 (digitalised).
- Karl Weiß (1882). "Klieber, Josef". Allgemeine Deutsche Biographie (in German). Vol. 16. Leipzig: Duncker & Humblot. pp. 182–183.
- Neuigkeits-Welt-Blatt vom 25. Oktober 1910 Nr. 117, Seite 9.
- "Klieber Josef". In: Österreichisches Biographisches Lexikon 1815–1950 (ÖBL). Vol. 3, Austrian Academy of Sciences, Vienna 1965, p. 402 f. (Direct links to "p. 402", "p. 403")
- Walter Krause (1980). "Klieber, Josef". Neue Deutsche Biographie (in German). Vol. 12. Berlin: Duncker & Humblot. pp. 64–65. (full text online).
