= Hrushevsky Street =

Hrushevsky Street is a street name mostly in Ukraine commemorated to Mykhailo Hrushevsky.

It may refer to:

- Hrushevsky Street (Kyiv)
- Hrushevsky Street (Ivano-Frankivsk)
