= Austro-Hungarian Bank =

Central bank of the Habsburg Monarchy

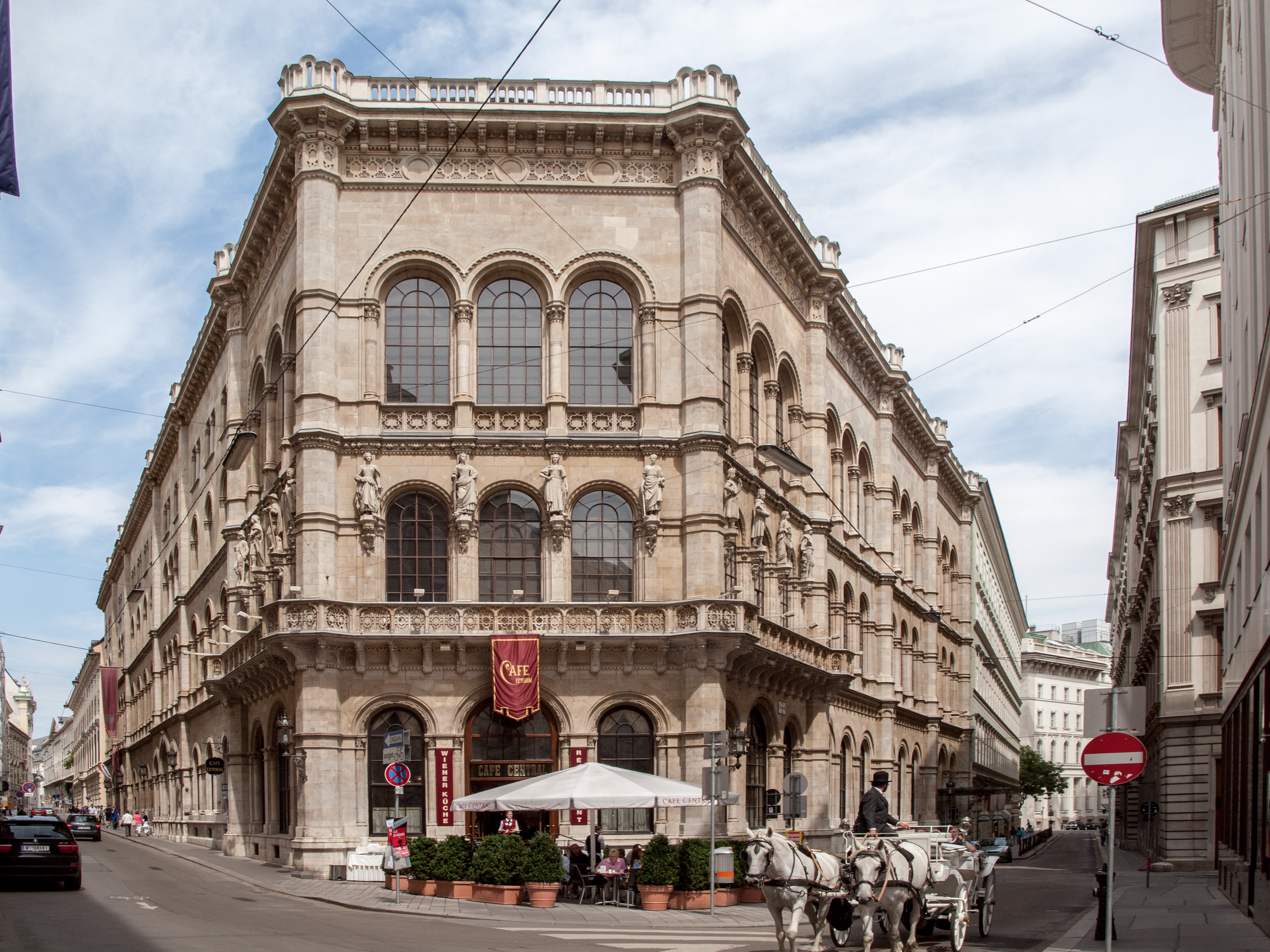
Palais Ferstel in Vienna, the Austro-Hungarian Bank's head office from 1860 to 1922.

The Austro-Hungarian Bank (German: Oesterreichisch-ungarische Bank, Hungarian: Osztrák–Magyar Bank, Czech: Rakousko-uherská banka, Polish: Bank Austriacko-Węgierski, Serbo-Croatian: Austro-Ugarska banka, Italian: Banca austro-ungarica, Ukrainian: Австро-Угорський банк) was the central bank of the Habsburg Monarchy in the 19th and early 20th centuries.

The institution was founded in 1816 as the privilegirte oesterreichische National-Bank (lit. 'Privileged Austrian National Bank'), and changed its name in 1878 as a delayed consequence of the Austro-Hungarian Compromise of 1867. It was liquidated in the financial turmoil following the collapse of the Habsburg Monarchy in late 1918, and was principally succeeded by the Oesterreichische Nationalbank in Vienna, the Hungarian National Bank in Budapest, the National Bank of Czechoslovakia in Prague, and the National Bank of the Kingdom of Serbs, Croats and Slovenes in Belgrade.

== Background ==
The first note-issuing institution in the Habsburg Monarchy was the Municipal Bank of Vienna or Wiener Stadtbank, established in 1706. It started issuing banknotes in 1762, which were known as "Bancozettel". During the Napoleonic Wars, the imperial Austrian government issued paper money of its own and rapidly increased its supply to finance the war effort, causing inflation.

== Austrian Empire ==
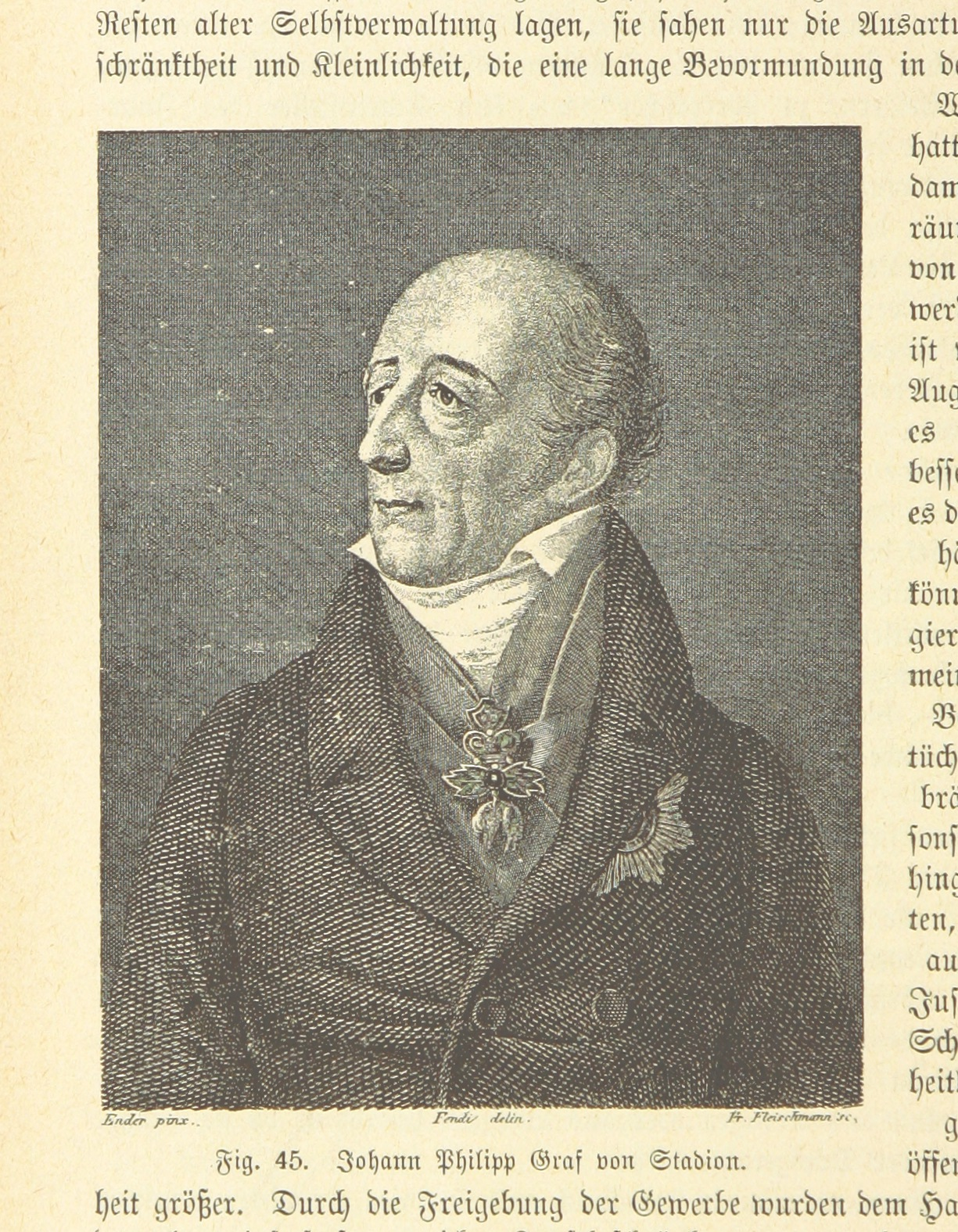
Johann Philipp Stadion, Count von Warthausen was instrumental in the Bank's creation in 1816.

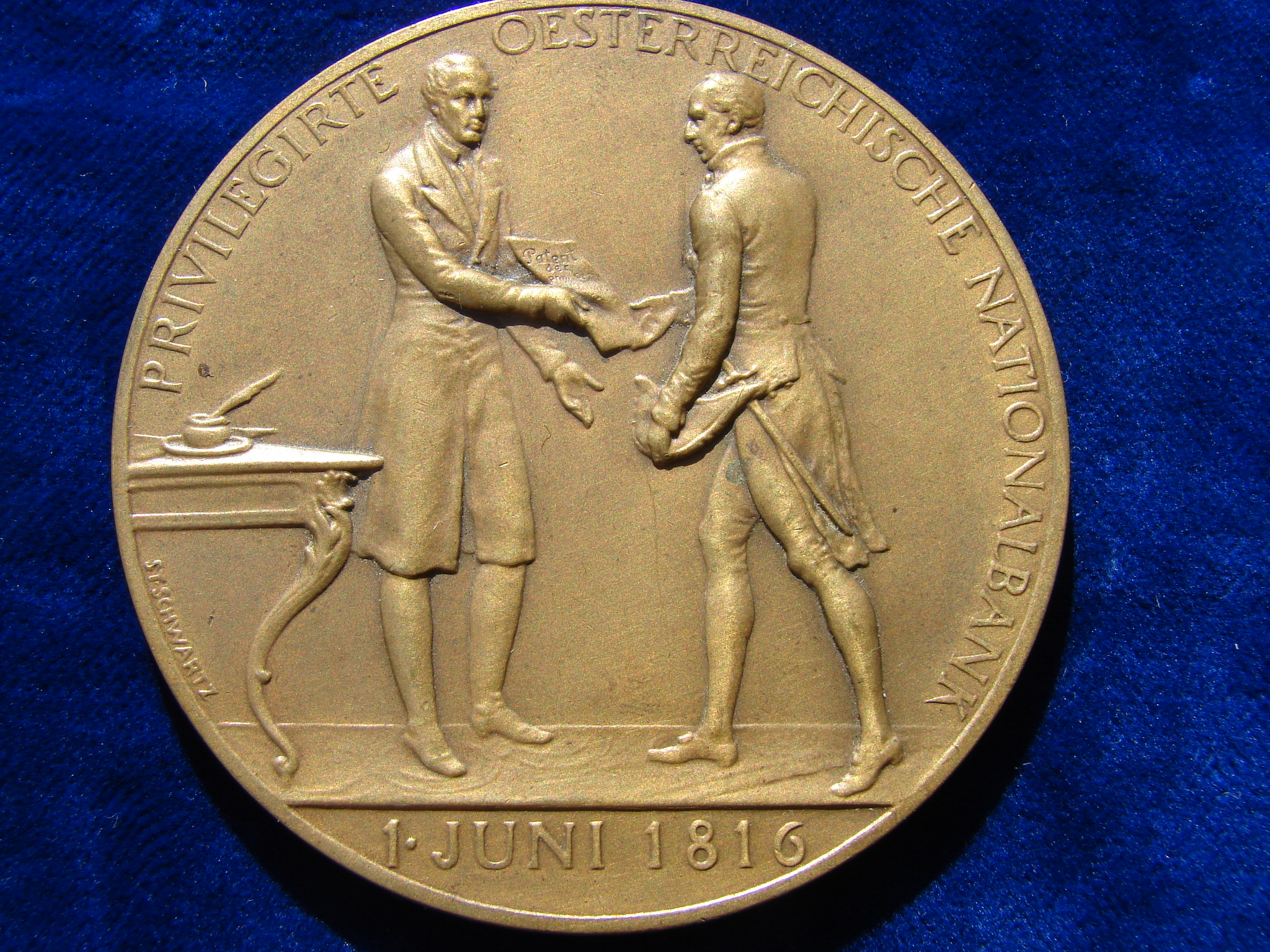
Centennial medal of the Bank's creation, 1916: Emperor Francis I gives the Bank's patent to Johann Philipp Stadion

After peace was restored by the Congress of Vienna, and on advice from statesman Johann Philipp Stadion, Emperor Francis I established the privilegirte oesterreichische National-Bank by imperial patent on 1 June 1816. Its shareholders were private individuals, in contrast to the municipality-owned Wiener Stadtbank. Its first task was the redemption of the depreciated wartime paper money to re-establish trust in the currency. On 15 July 1817, it was granted another imperial patent to issue money by printing banknotes, and had its first permanent staff by January 1818. It soon started developing its network of branches throughout the Austrian Empire.

On 2 October 1841, Emperor Ferdinand I renewed the Bank's issuance monopoly, and on that occasion altered its governance to increase government control. The Bank opened its first branch in Prague in 1847, and its second in Pest in 1851. The Bank's notes suffered depreciation during the successive episodes of financial stress associated with the revolutions of 1848–1849, the Autumn Crisis of 1850 with Prussia, and the Crimean War mobilization from 1853 to 1856. On 27 December 1862, Emperor Franz Joseph I again renewed the Bank's issuance privilege, granted it greater independence, and emulated the UK Bank Charter Act 1844 by limiting the volume of banknotes in circulation to 200 million gulden backed with precious metal. In 1866, however, the Austrian government breached these arrangements to finance the Austro-Prussian War, and had to subsequently pay compensation to the Bank.

== Austro-Hungarian Empire ==
The matter of the central bank and its governance was set aside during the negotiations that led to the Austro-Hungarian Compromise of 1867, with the understanding that it would be reformed in the future. Meanwhile, the law of 18 March 1872, based on the experience of 1866, stipulated that any money issues in excess of the 200 million-gulden limit must be backed by precious metal reserves. Backed by these provisions, the Bank managed to preserve monetary stability during the Austrian financial boom-and-bust episode of 1873. By 1875, it had 24 branches outside of Vienna.

The adaptation of the bank's to the Monarchy's new political structure was only finalized in 1878, when its name was changed to Austro-Hungarian Bank. The bank was given a unitary governance with a general meeting (German: Generalversammlung) and governing council (German: Generalrat) chaired by a Governor, but a dual operating structure with two separate executive teams (German: Direktionen) and head offices (German: Hauptanstalten) in Vienna and Budapest. The governor was to be jointly nominated by the respective ministers of finance of Austria and Hungary, and the bank was statutorily committed to opening new branches on an equitable basis in both parts of the Habsburg Monarchy. Hungarian nationalists were not satisfied by these arrangements and kept advocating for a separate Hungarian central bank, but their efforts remained unsuccessful until the end of the joint monarchy.

An 8-year transition from bimetallism to the gold standard, replacing the Austro-Hungarian gulden with the Austro-Hungarian krone, was completed in 1900. Another renewal of the bank's issuance privilege, on 21 September 1899, curtailed its prior independence. Even so, the Austro-Hungarian currency's gold parity was successfully maintained until 1914. During World War I, however, the Bank was unable to preserve monetary stability against the pressures of military expenses and economic shortages. The money supply increased thirteenfold, and prices rose sixteenfold compared to their prewar level. By late 1918, the real income of workers had been reduced to one fifth of what it had been in the last year of peace. About forty percent of the cost of war was covered by the central bank's monetary financing, and about sixty percent by war loans.

== Post-WWI monetary turmoil and dissolution ==
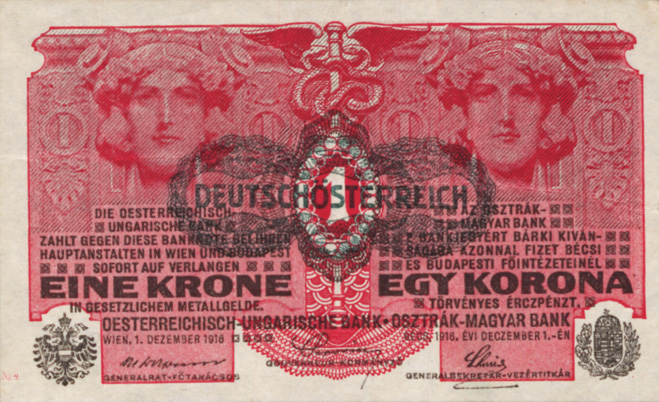
Austro-Hungarian Bank note of 1916, stamped "Deutschösterreich" (Republic of German-Austria) in late 1918 or 1919

On 18 October 1918, the Diet of Hungary voted to terminate the kingdom's union with Austria, and on 31 October 1918, newly appointed Prime Minister of Hungary Mihály Károlyi repudiated the Compromise of 1867. The authorities of the rump Republic of German-Austria soon pressured the Austro-Hungarian Bank to finance its deficits. In response, the other countries that emerged from the dissolution of Austria-Hungary started stamping the notes circulating on their respective territories to mitigate the inflationary pressure. German-Austria ended up having to stamp its own notes as well. The Treaty of Saint-Germain-en-Laye, signed on 10 September 1919, eventually provided for the Bank's liquidation and the allocation of its assets and liabilities to successor states, namely Austria and Hungary but also Czechoslovakia, Italy, Poland, Romania, and Yugoslavia.

Between 1918 and 1922, the Bank covered about 75 percent of the budget deficit of the new Republican Austrian state. The Austrian currency depreciated sharply, from 16 to 30 kronen against the U.S. dollar during the first half of 1919, from where it further collapsed to 5,275 kronen to the dollar by the end of 1921. The hyperinflation was only stopped by the protocol for the reconstruction of Austria, signed in Geneva on 4 October 1922 and entailing a harsh fiscal and economic adjustment program supported by a loan guaranteed by the League of Nations. The Bank's last ordinary general meeting was held on 14 July 1921, and the last meeting of its governing council on 15 December 1922.

== Governors ==
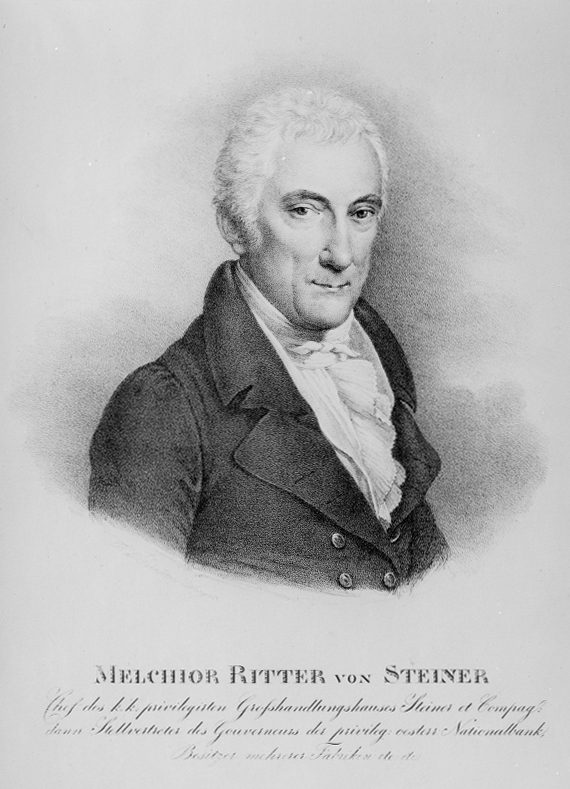
Melchior von Steiner, the Bank's third Governor

- Ádám Nemes von Hídvég (17 June 1816 – 15 November 1817)
- Joseph Carl von Dietrichstein (15 November 1817 – 17 September 1825)
- Melchior von Steiner (acting, 1825 – 1830)
- Adrian Nicolaus von Barbier (4 September 1830 – 27 March 1837)
- Carl Joseph Alois von Lederer (27 March 1837 – 31 October 1847; acting, 9 February 1848 – 18 May 1848)
- Franz Xaver Breyer von Breynau (31 October 1847 – early 1848)
- Josef Mayer von Gravenegg (18 May 1848 – 9 January 1849)
- Joseph von Pipitz (6 August 1849 – 8 November 1877)
- Alois Moser (28 September 1878 – 6 March 1892)
- Gyula Kautz (6 March 1892 – 19 February 1900)
- Leon Biliński (19 February 1900 – 15 February 1909)
- Sándor Popovics (15 April 1909 – 8 February 1918)
- Ignaz Gruber von Menninger (6 March 1919 – 18 March 1919)
- Alexander Spitzmüller (19 December 1919 – December 1922)

== Buildings ==
The Austro-Hungarian Bank had two head offices, in Vienna and Budapest. By 1914, it had 104 branches and 179 local offices throughout the Monarchy.

=== Vienna head office ===
At its creation, the Bank was temporarily settled at Singerstrasse 1 next to St. Stephen's Cathedral. In 1819–1821, it purchased houses on Vienna's prestigious Herrengasse, and replaced them after demolition with a building designed by Rafael von Riegel after designs by Charles de Moreau and Paul Wilhelm Eduard Sprenger. The new building was inaugurated by Francis I on 1 July 1821 and completed in 1823. Its pediment was adorned with sculptures by Josef Klieber, which were however removed when the building was repurposed in 1874.

In 1860, the Bank moved across the street to a new building complex designed in 1855 by architect Heinrich Ferstel, himself the son of a Nationalbank official, with ornate decoration including twelve statues by Hans Gasser representing the lands of the Austrian Empire. The lavish interior decoration included works by painters Franz Josef Dobiaschofsky and Carl Joseph Geiger, and sculpture by Joseph Gasser von Valhorn and Franz Melnitzky. The complex also hosted the Wiener Börse (which only stayed there until 1869), a commercial mall (German: Basarhof), and from its opening in 1876, the famed Café Central. In 1897, the Bank expanded into the adjacent Palais Hardegg on Freyung 1, where the Bank relocated its Austrian general management and the Governor's office. In 1924, in advance of its planned relocation, the Bank sold the entire complex to the Anglo-Austrian Bank, which redeveloped it for commercial use. The complex was comprehensively renovated in 1975–1982 and has been known since then as Palais Ferstel, including the recreation of the Café Central within the complex, albeit on a different location from the original.

In 1910, the Bank held a design competition for the design of a new head office in Vienna's Alsergrund district, which was won by Leopold Bauer, a disciple of celebrated Austrian architect Otto Wagner. Bauer's concept entailed a gigantic complex dominated by a massive 88-meter-high tower, partly on the location of the old Vienna General Hospital (later Campus Hof 1 of the University of Vienna). The construction of a first building intended for money printing facilities started in 1913 after demolition of the Alser Kaserne barracks, but was disrupted by World War I and stopped in 1917; the rest of Bauer's grandiose development plan was never implemented. After the war's end, the unfinished printing building was repurposed on a design by the Bank's architects Ferdinand Glaser and Rudolf Eisler. It was completed in 1925 to host the Oesterreichische Nationalbank, just weeks ahead of the introduction of the new currency, the Austrian schilling.

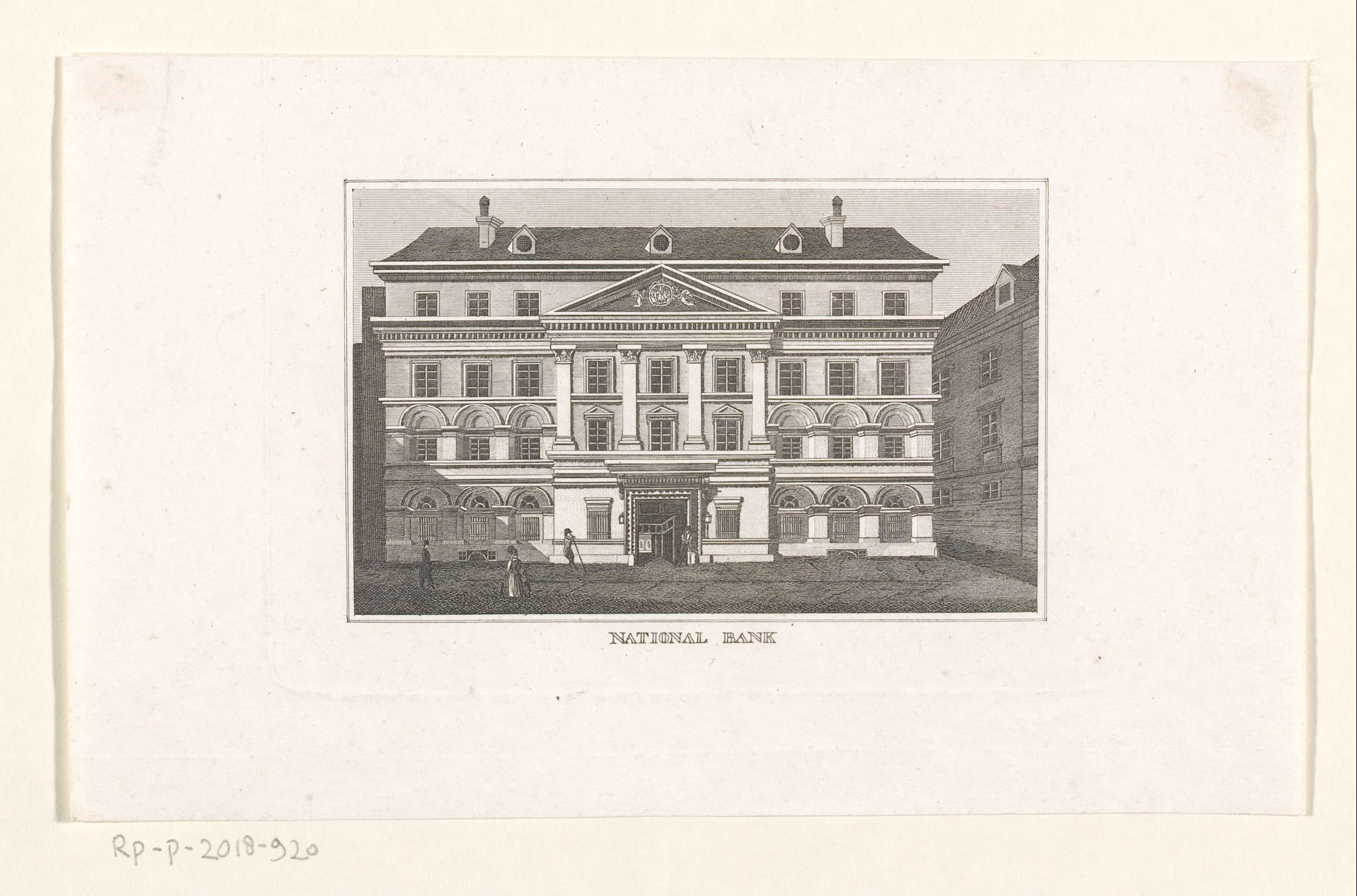
1820s engraving of the Bank building on Herrengasse

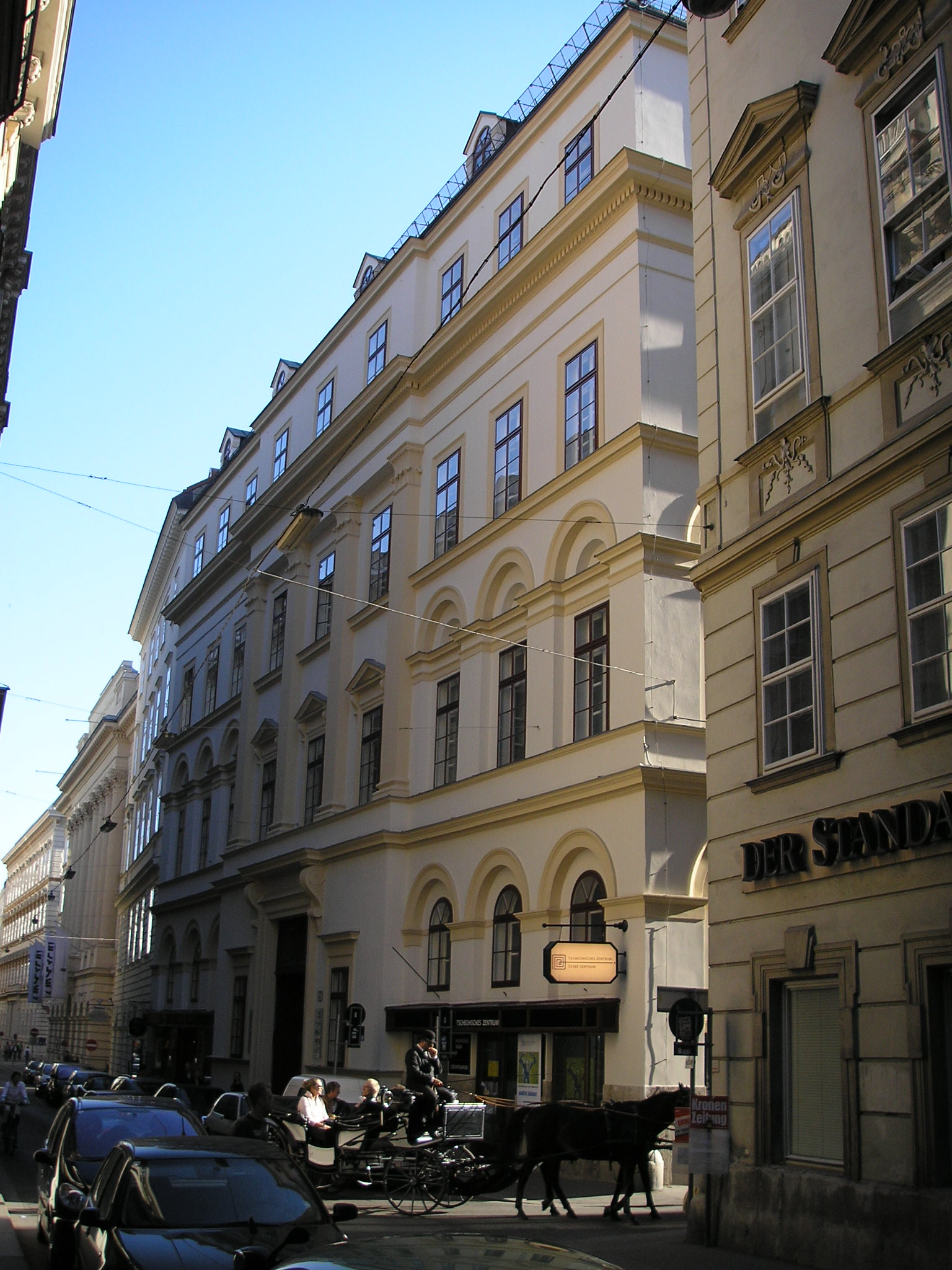
The same building in 2006

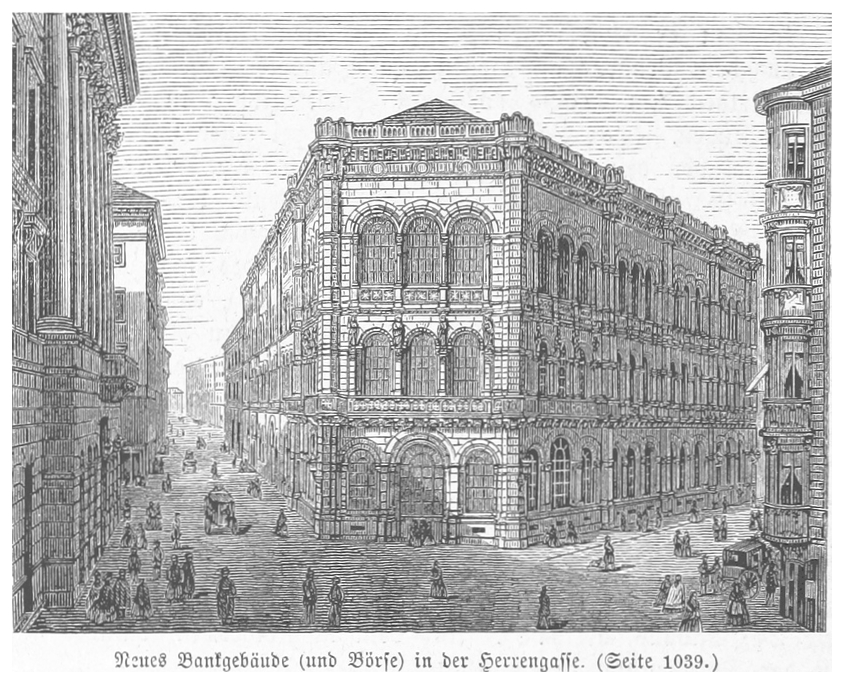
The Bank complex inaugurated in 1860, pictured in 1880

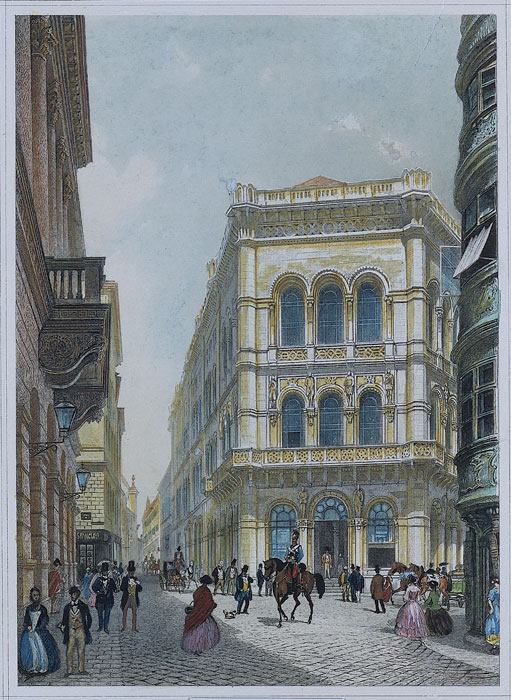
The Bank complex, engraving after Rudolf von Alt

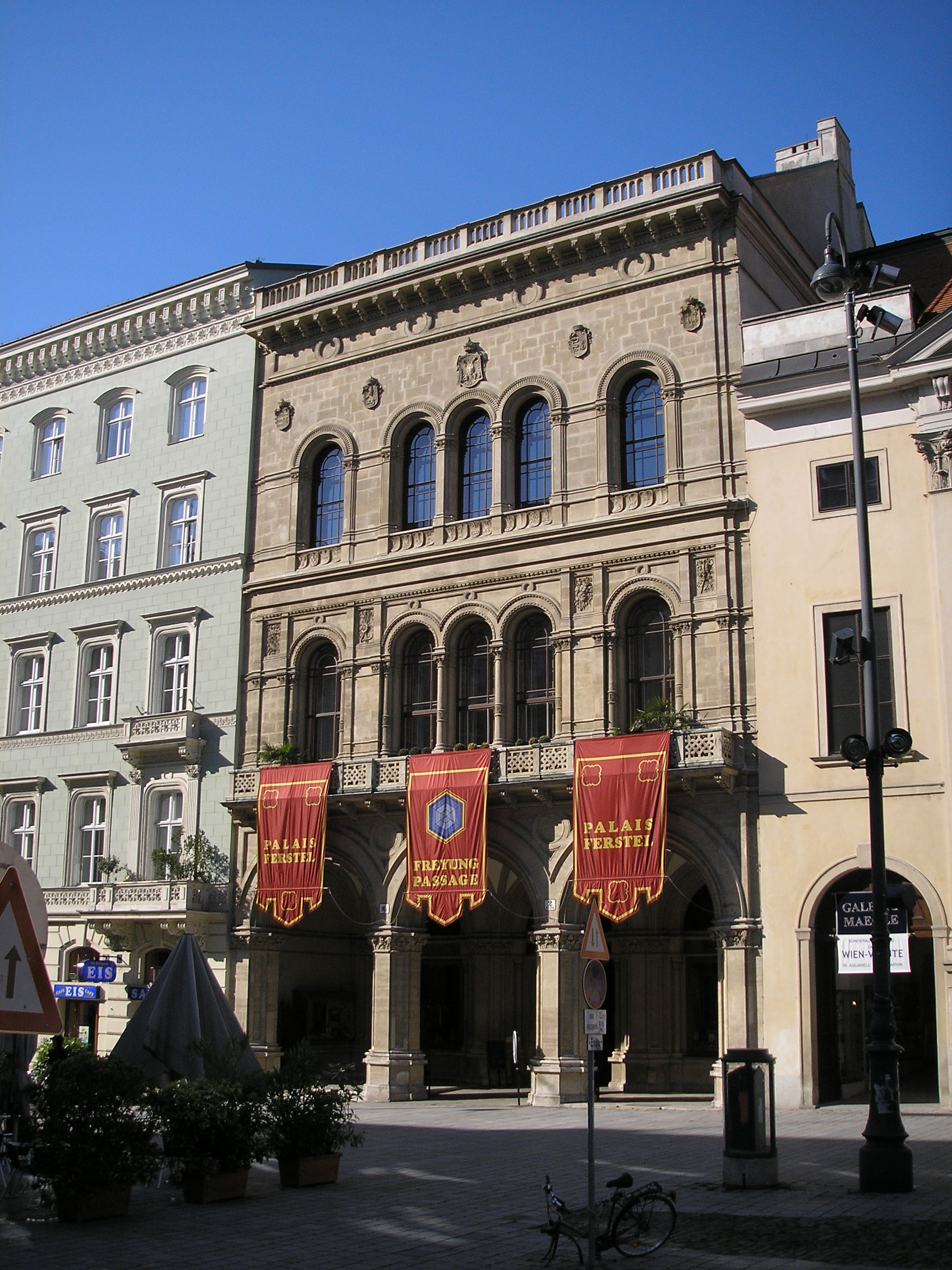
Entrance of the Bank complex on the Freyung square, 2006

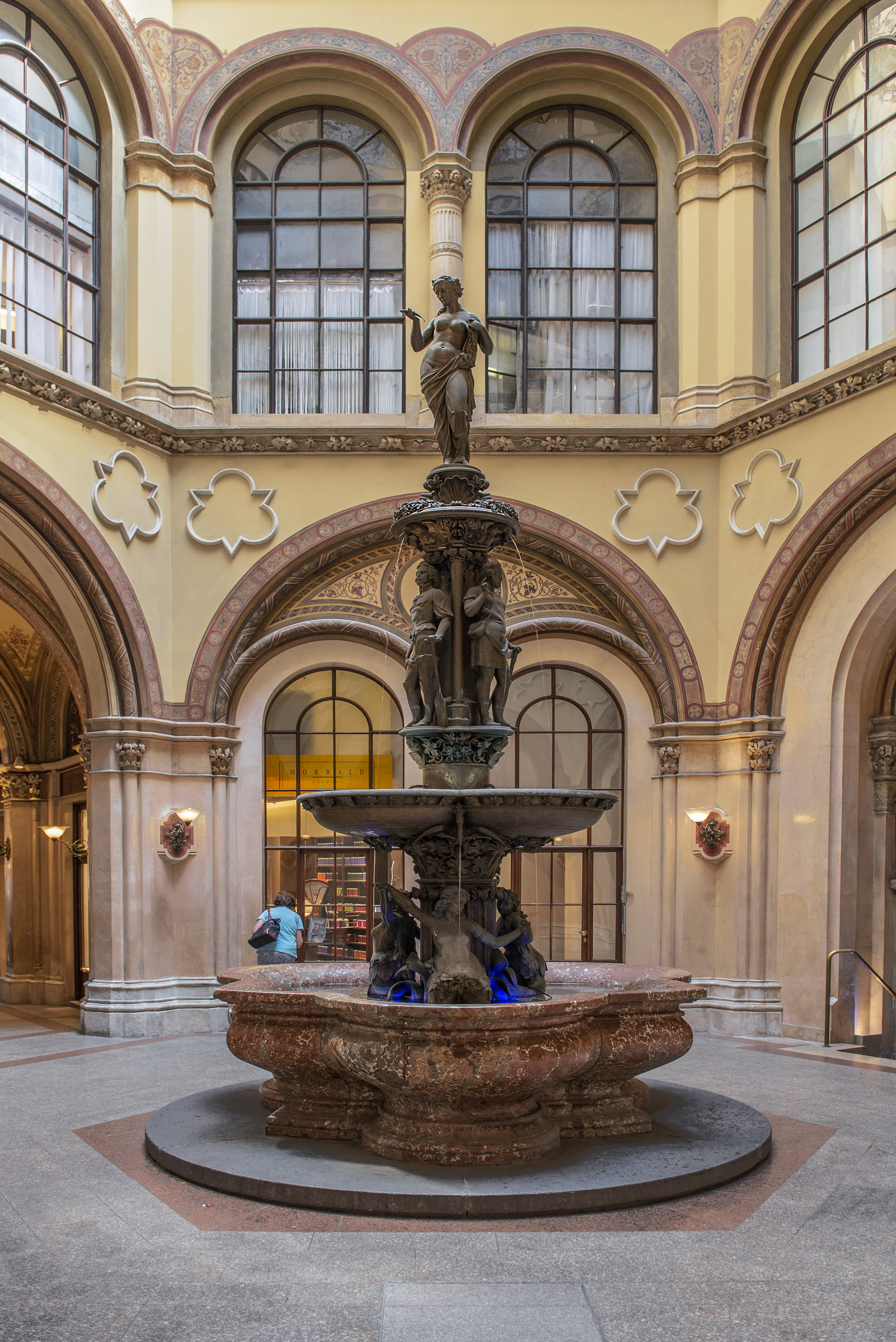
Donaunixenbrunnen fountain placed in the Bank complex in 1861

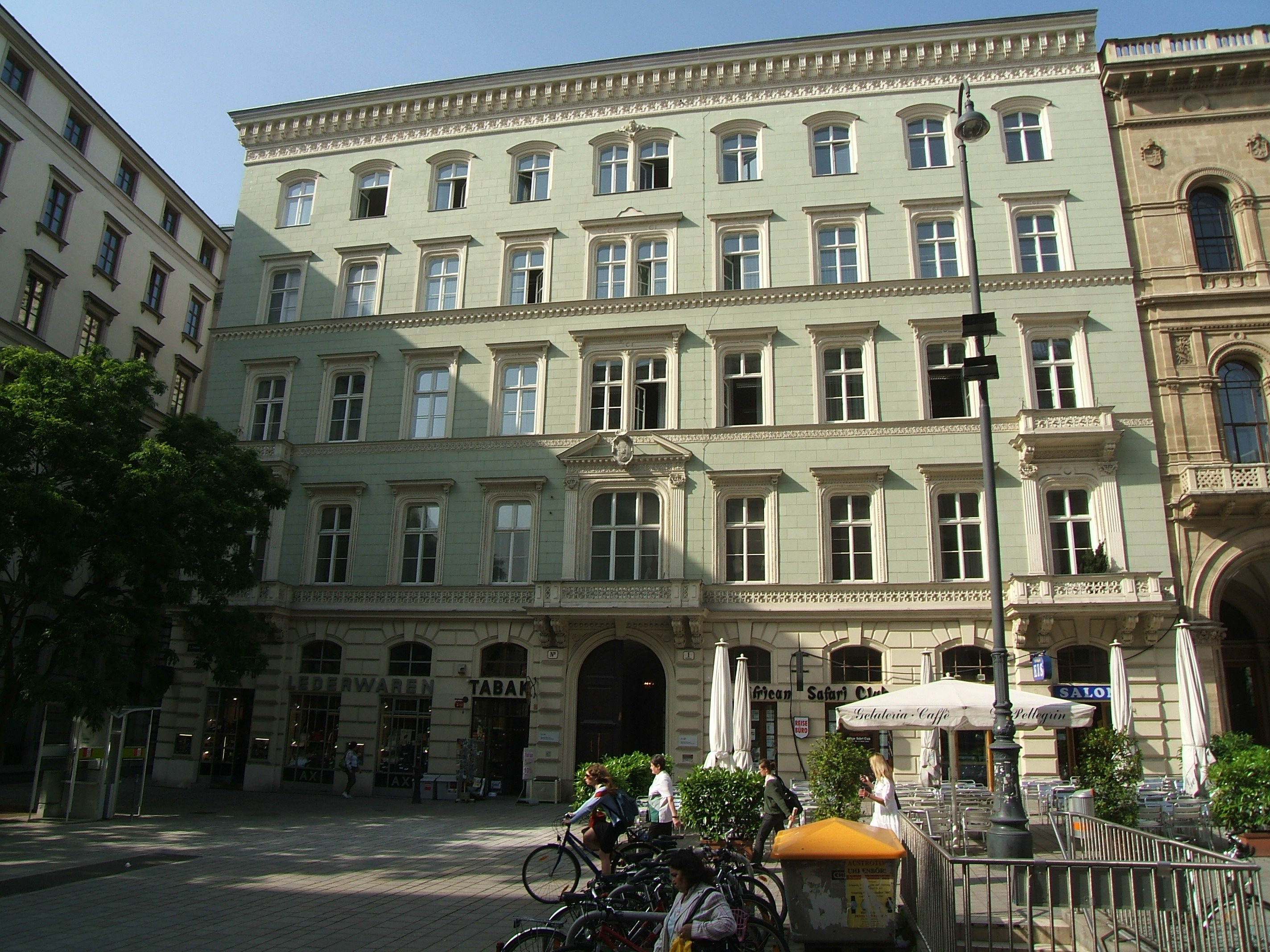
Palais Hardegg on Freyung 1

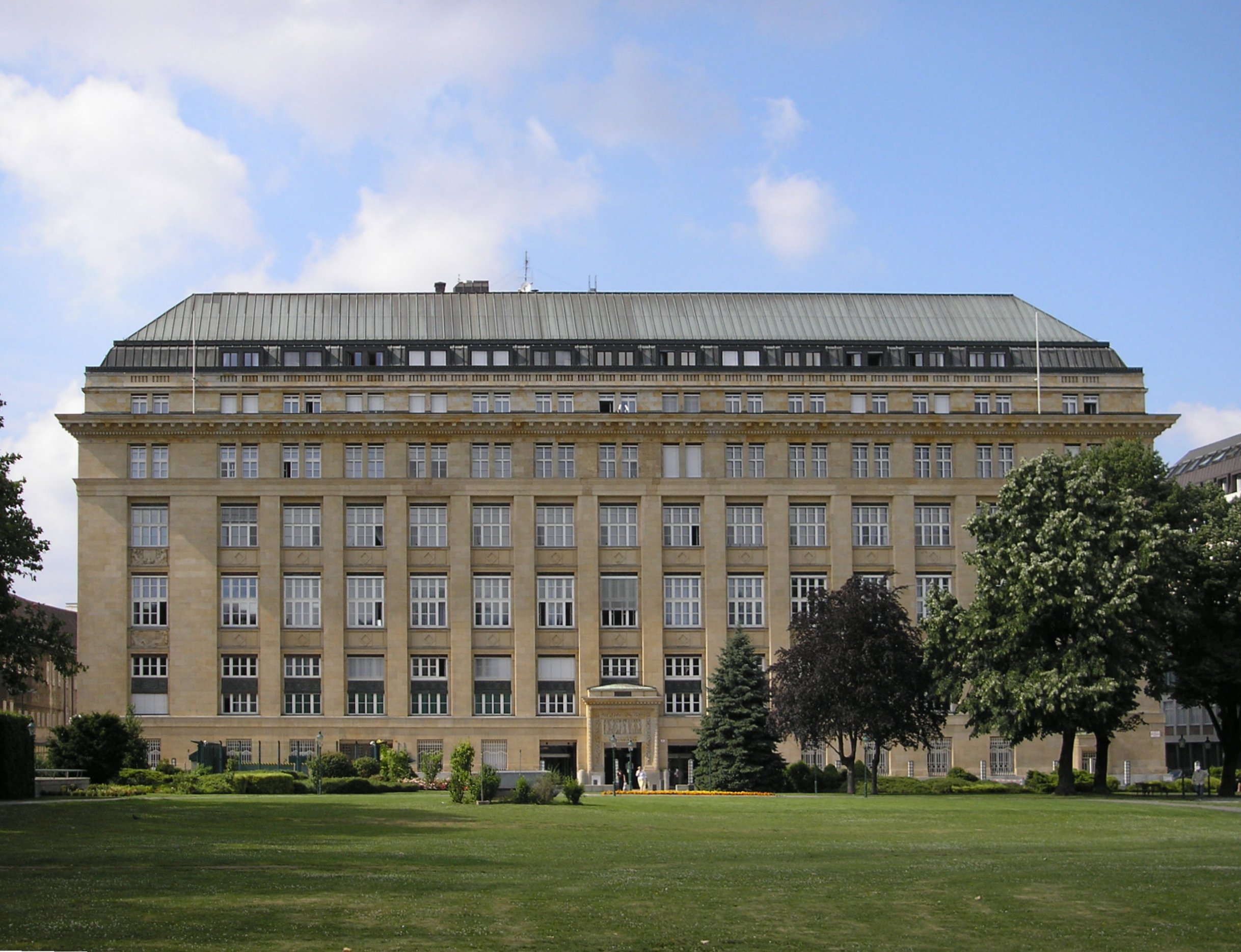
New Nationalbank building, started as printing facilities of the Austro-Hungarian Bank, 2006

=== Budapest head office ===
The new Budapest head office building of the Austro-Hungarian Bank was inaugurated in 1905, and later hosted the Hungarian National Bank. It was designed by architect Ignác Alpár, with sculpture by József Róna and Károly Senyei.

After World War II, the building's interiors were severely altered. A major renovation was undertaken in 2021, with the aim to reopen the building by the National Bank's 100th anniversary in 2024. The renovation was marred with controversy, however. It ended late, with the bank's staff only moving back in in early 2025, and was plagued with allegations of malpractice.

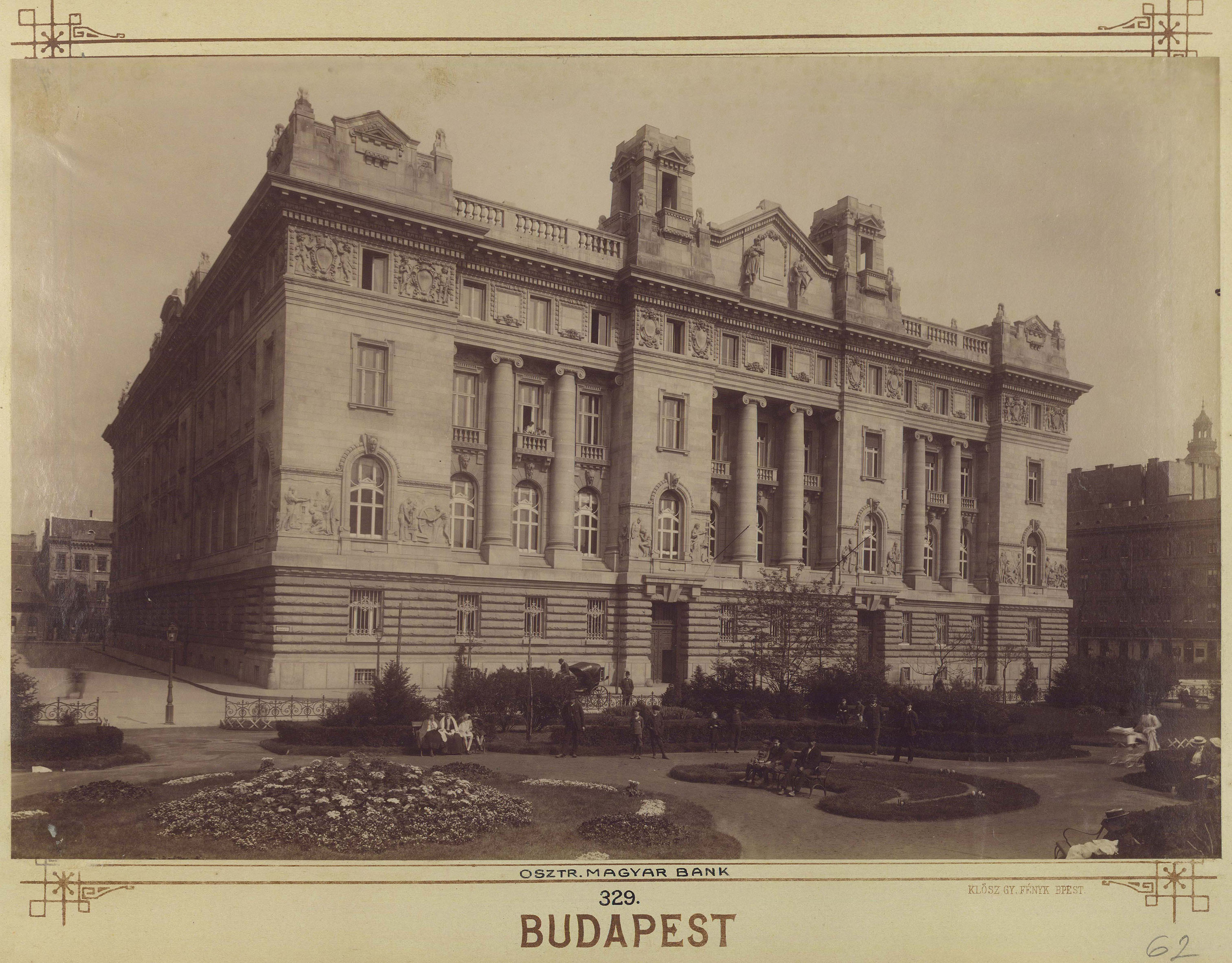
Budapest head office at the time of its inauguration, 1905

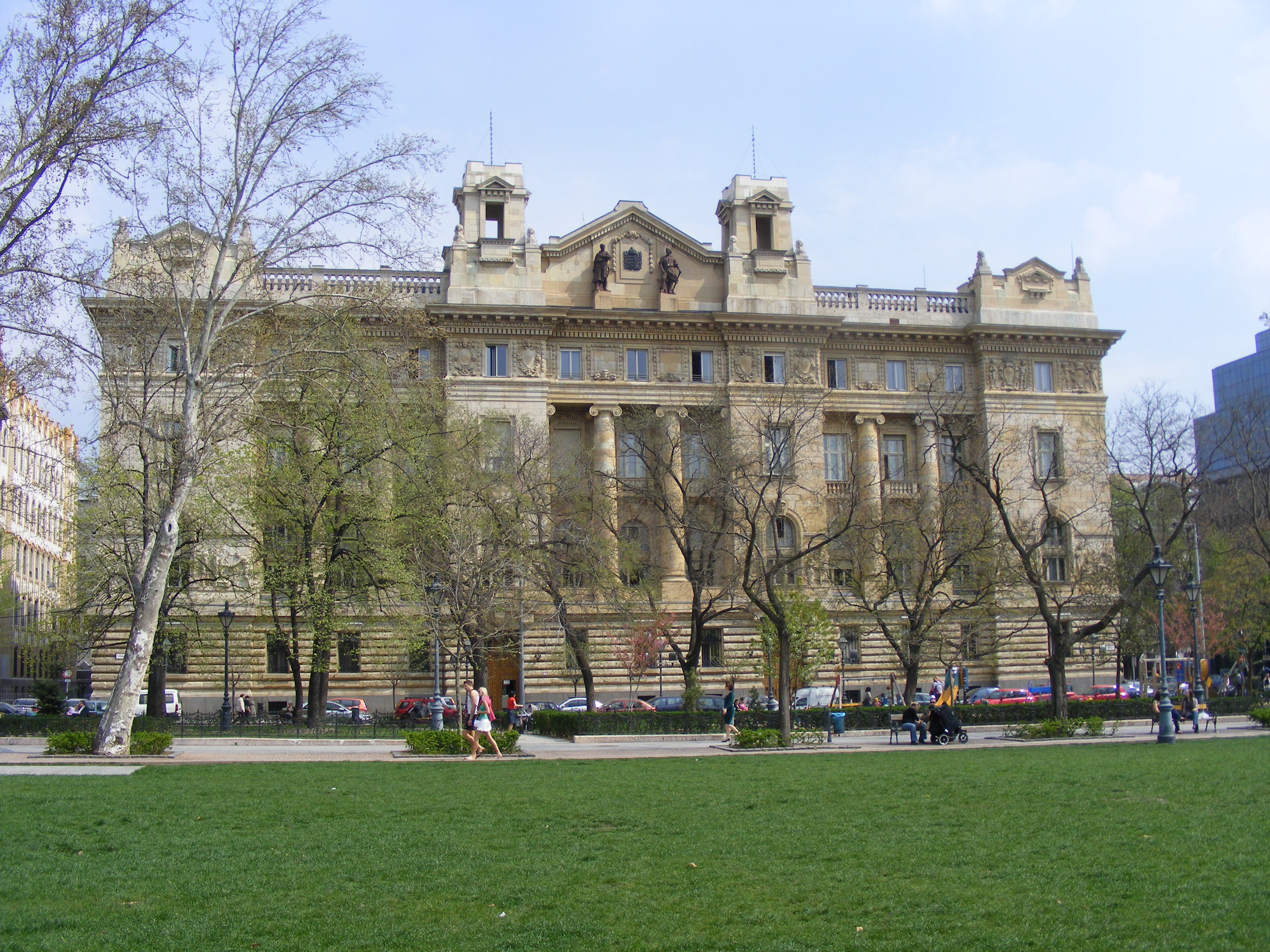
Budapest head office in 2009

Budapest head office in 2026, showing the attic added during the 2021-2025 remodeling

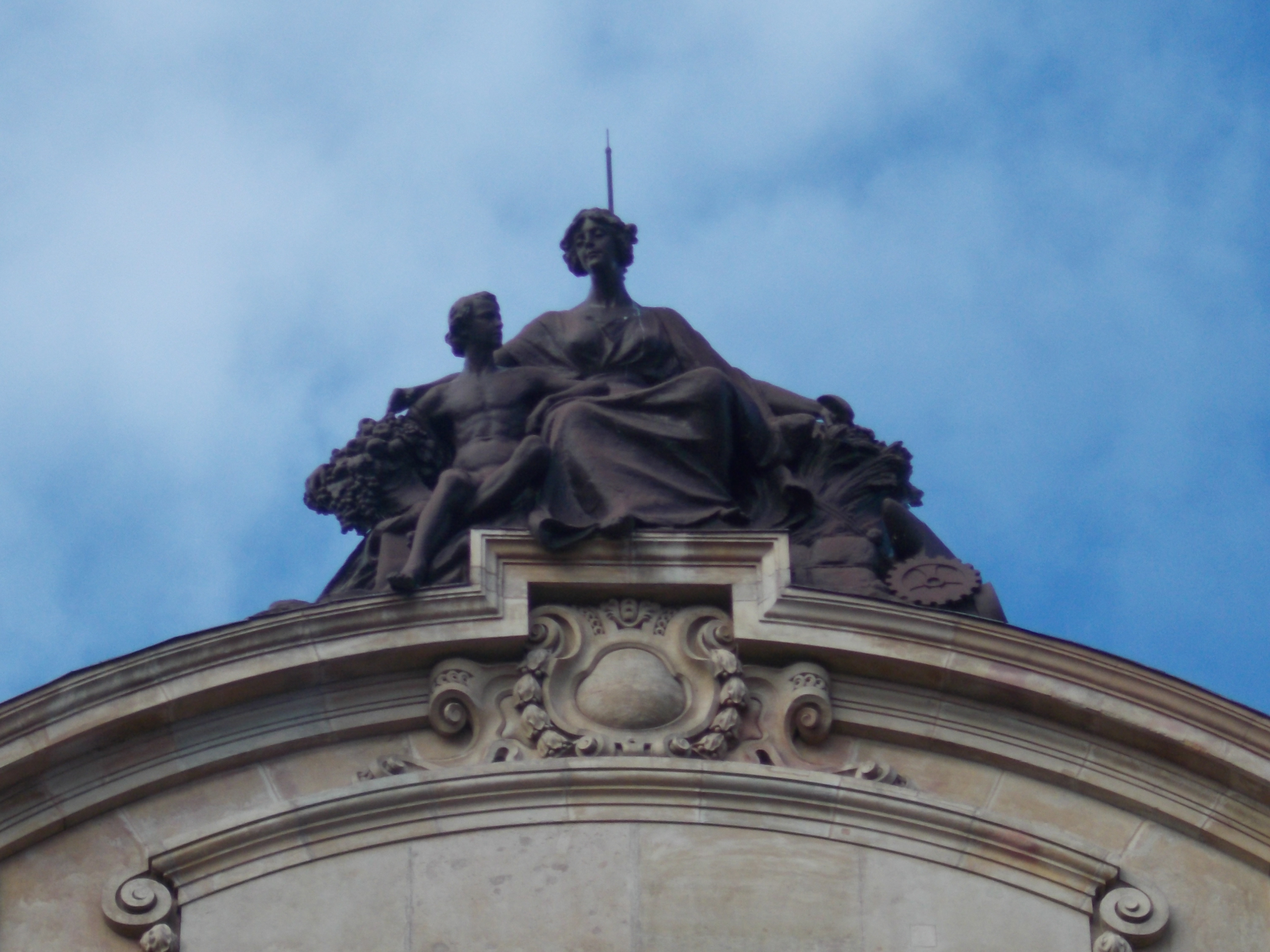
Allegory of the Bank, by József Róna

Sculpture on the building's façade

=== Branches in Cisleithania ===
The Prague branch of the Austro-Hungarian Bank was located in 1890 in the Schebek Palace, and remained there until 1918. In 1926 the palace became the seat of the newly established National Bank of Czechoslovakia. In 1963 it was taken over by the Czechoslovak Academy of Sciences, itself succeeded in 1993 by the Czech Academy of Sciences.

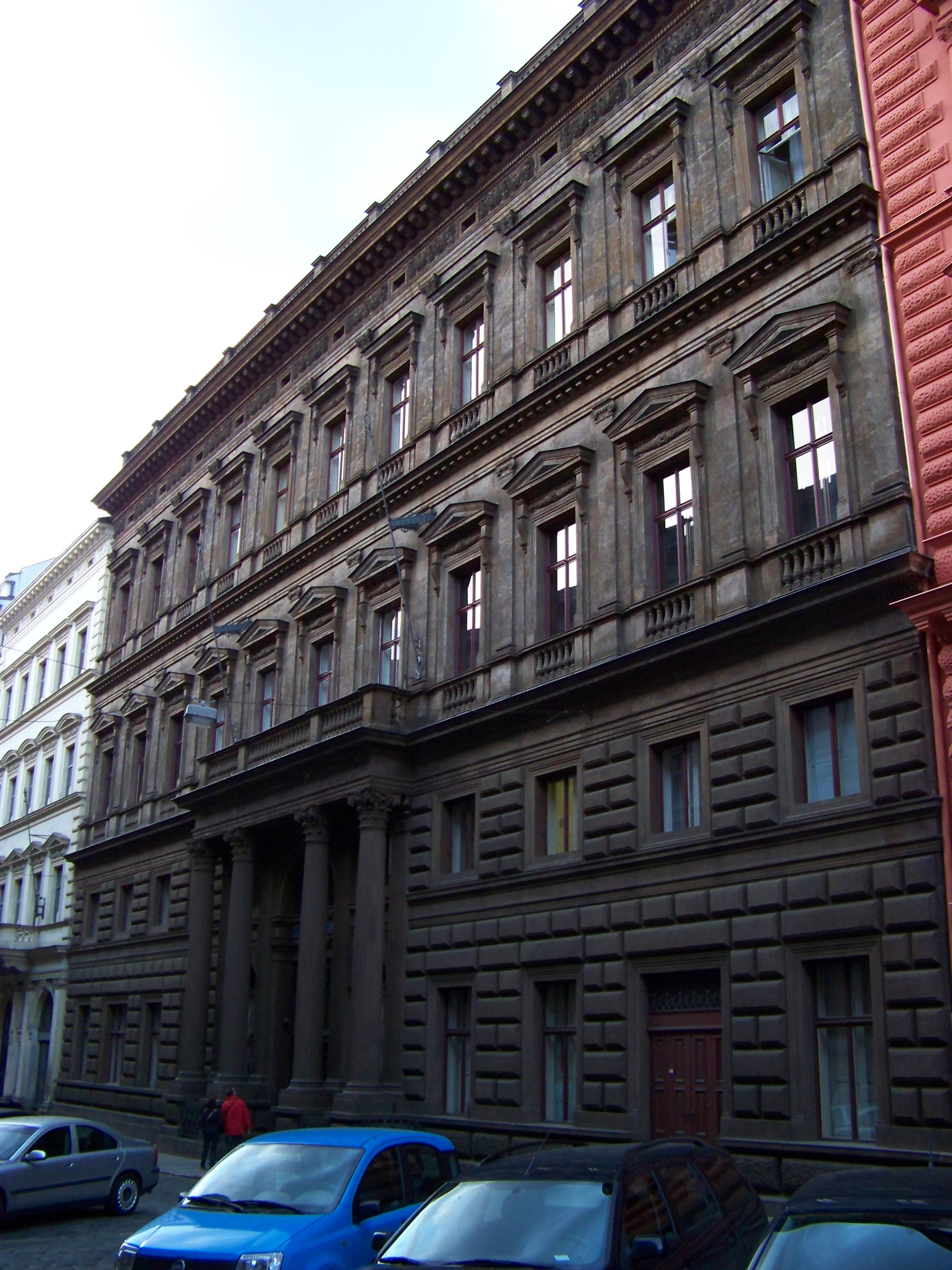
Schebek Palace (architect Vojtěch Ignác Ullmann, 1872), lately home of the CERGE-EI research center

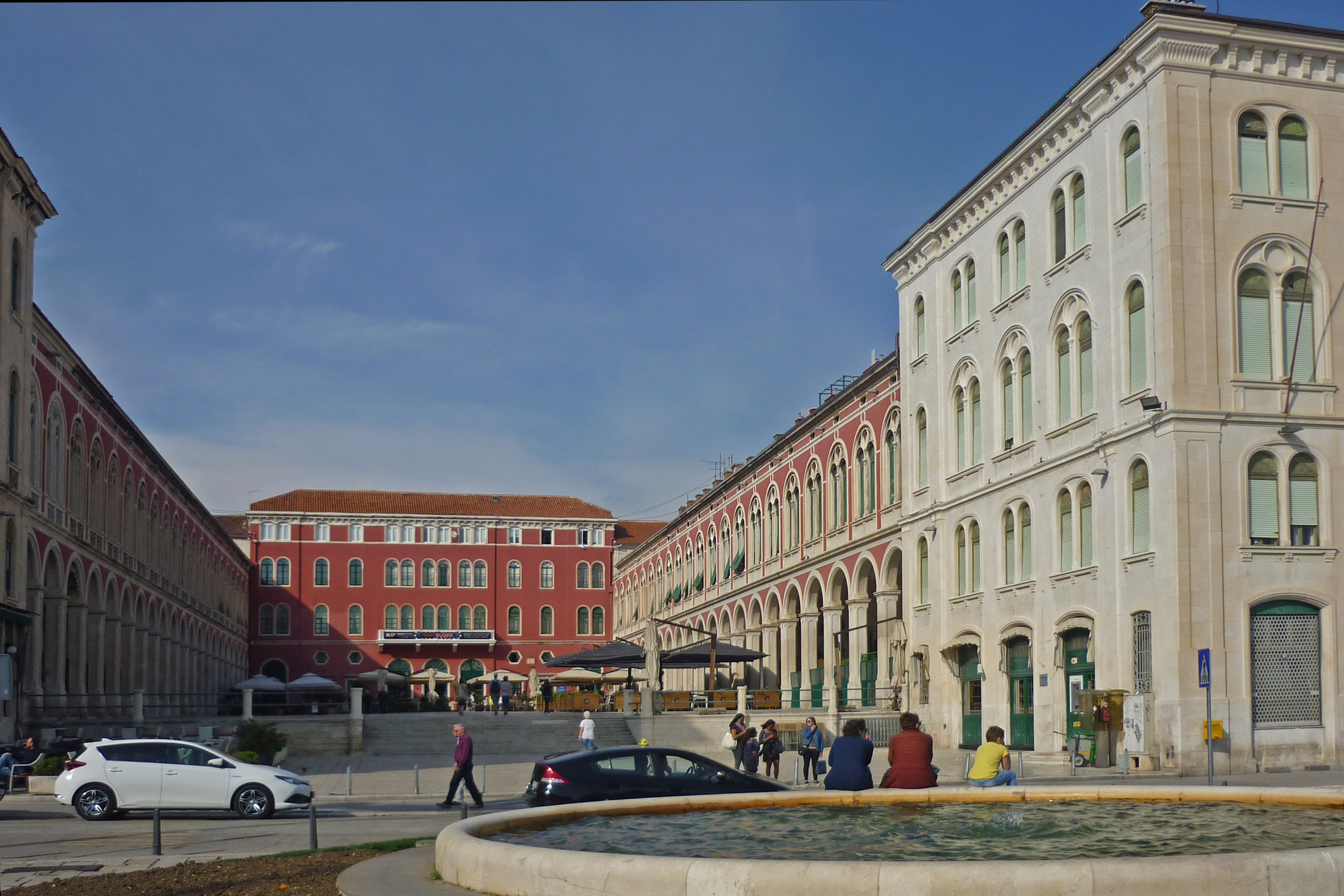
Former branch in Split (right), lately local office of the Croatian Ministry of Finance

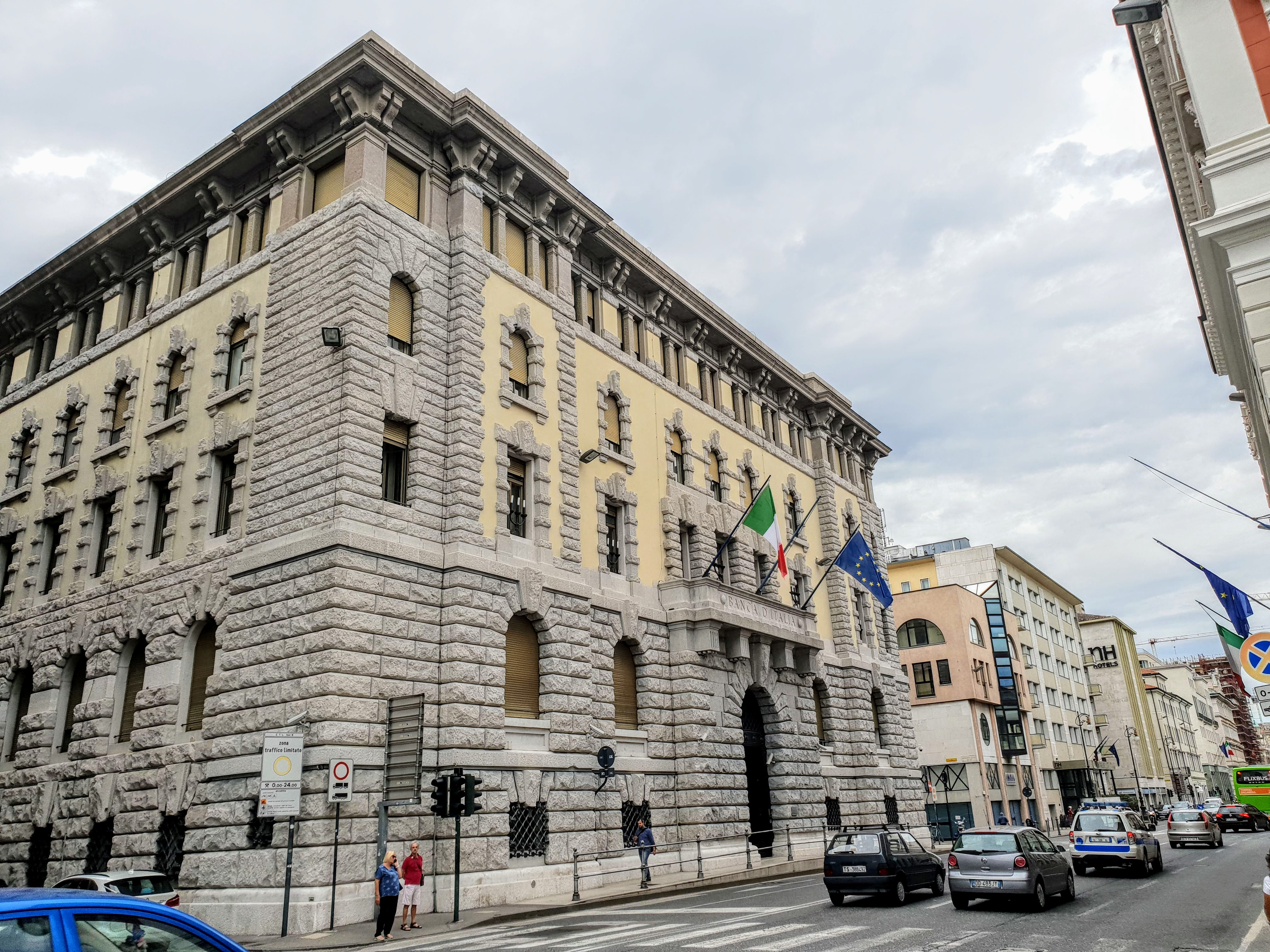
Former branch in Trieste (arch. Arduino Berlam, 1902), lately branch of the Bank of Italy

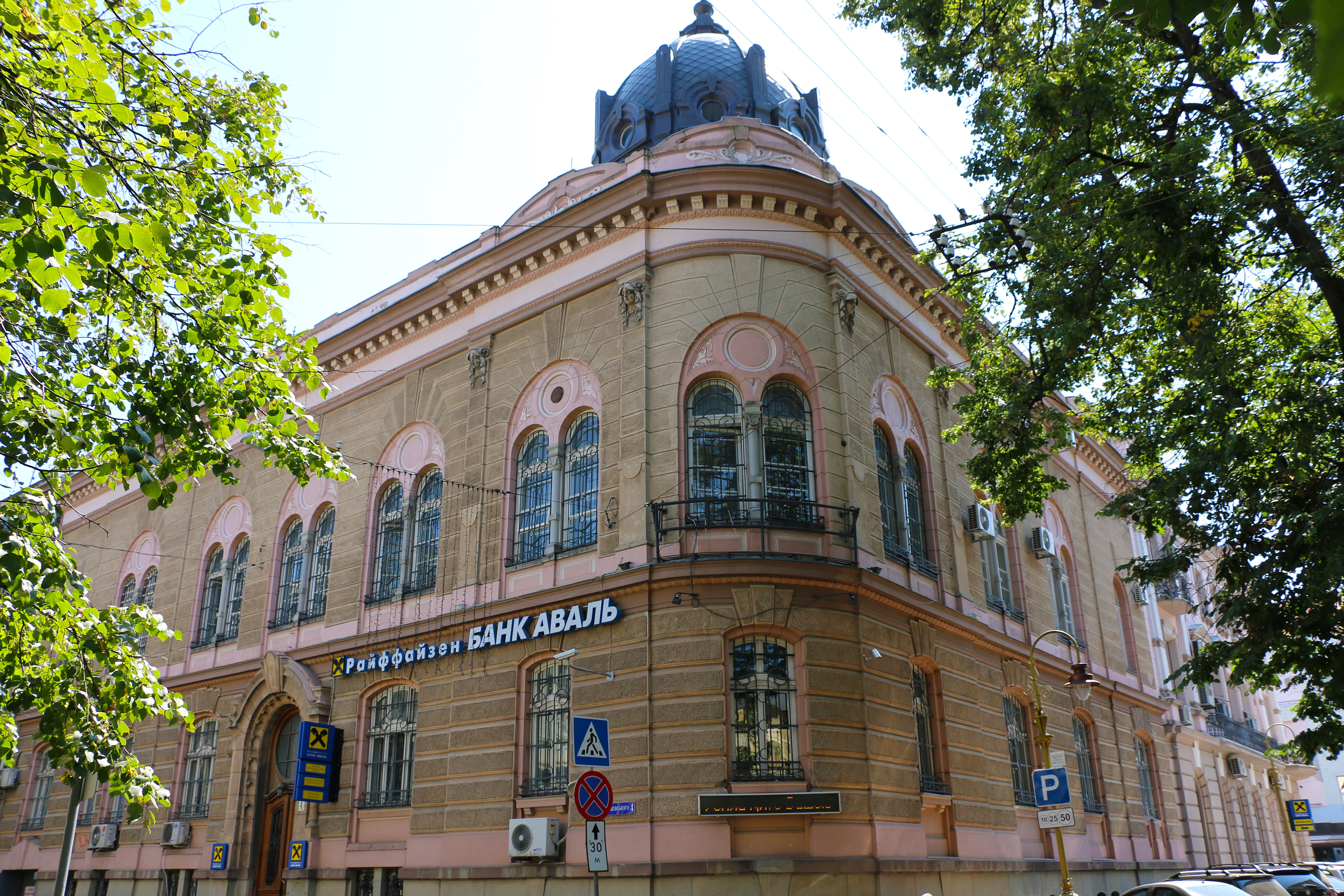
Former branch in Ivano-Frankivsk (arch. Jan Tomasz Kudelski, 1907), lately a branch of Raiffeisen Bank Ukraine

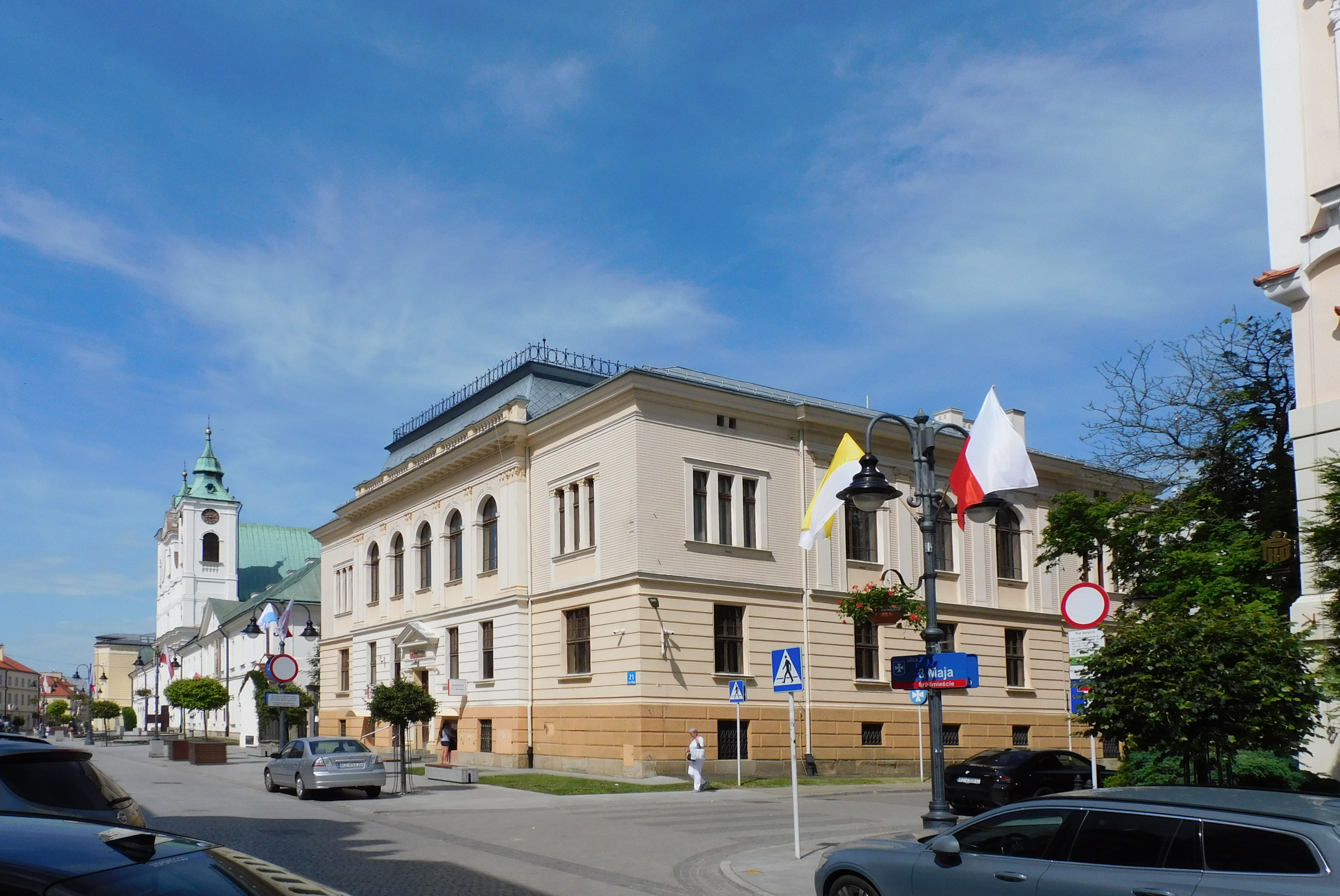
Former branch in Rzeszów (arch. Teodor Hoffmann, 1907), branch of Bank Pekao since 1989

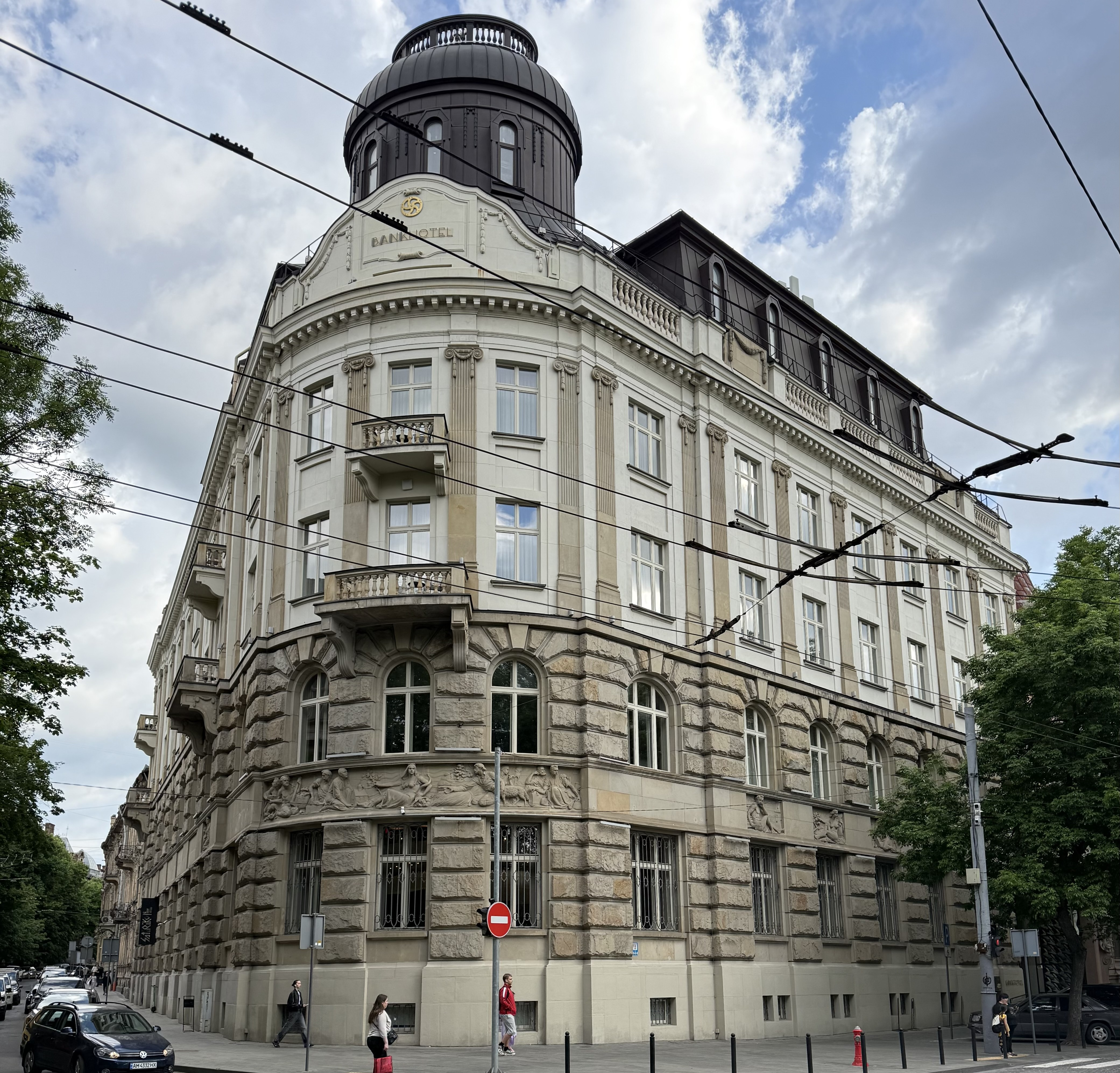
Former branch in Lviv (acrh. Edmund Zhikhovich & Michal Luzhetsky, 1912), repurposed as a hotel in 2018

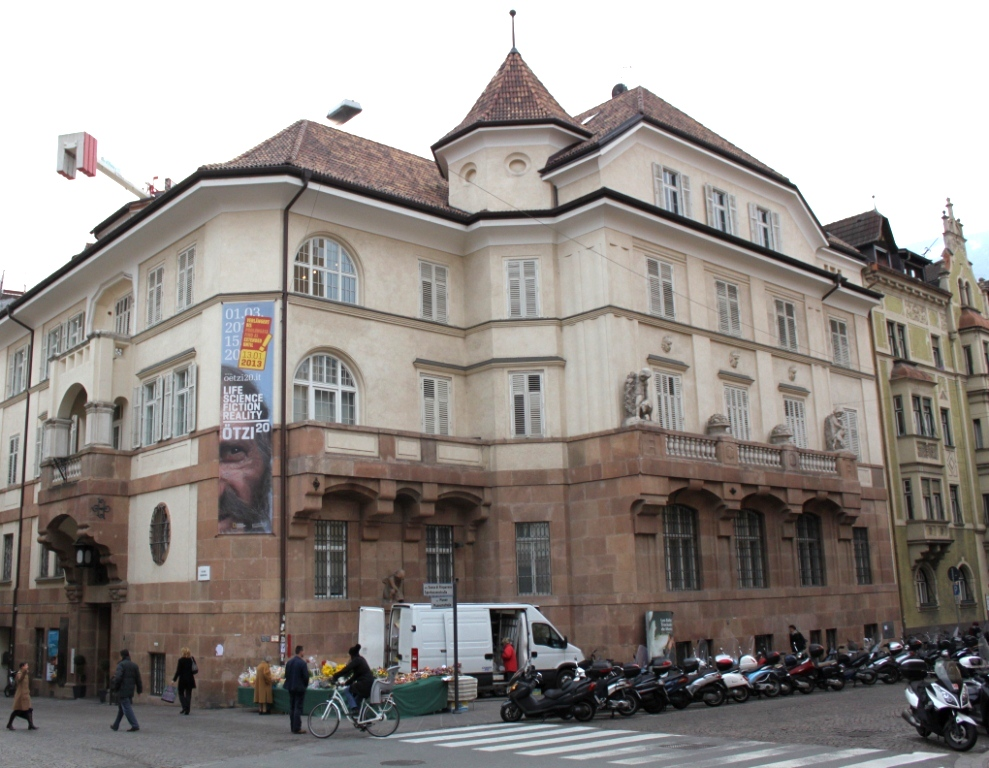
Former branch in Bolzano (arch. Rudolf Eiser, 1913), lately South Tyrol Museum of Archaeology

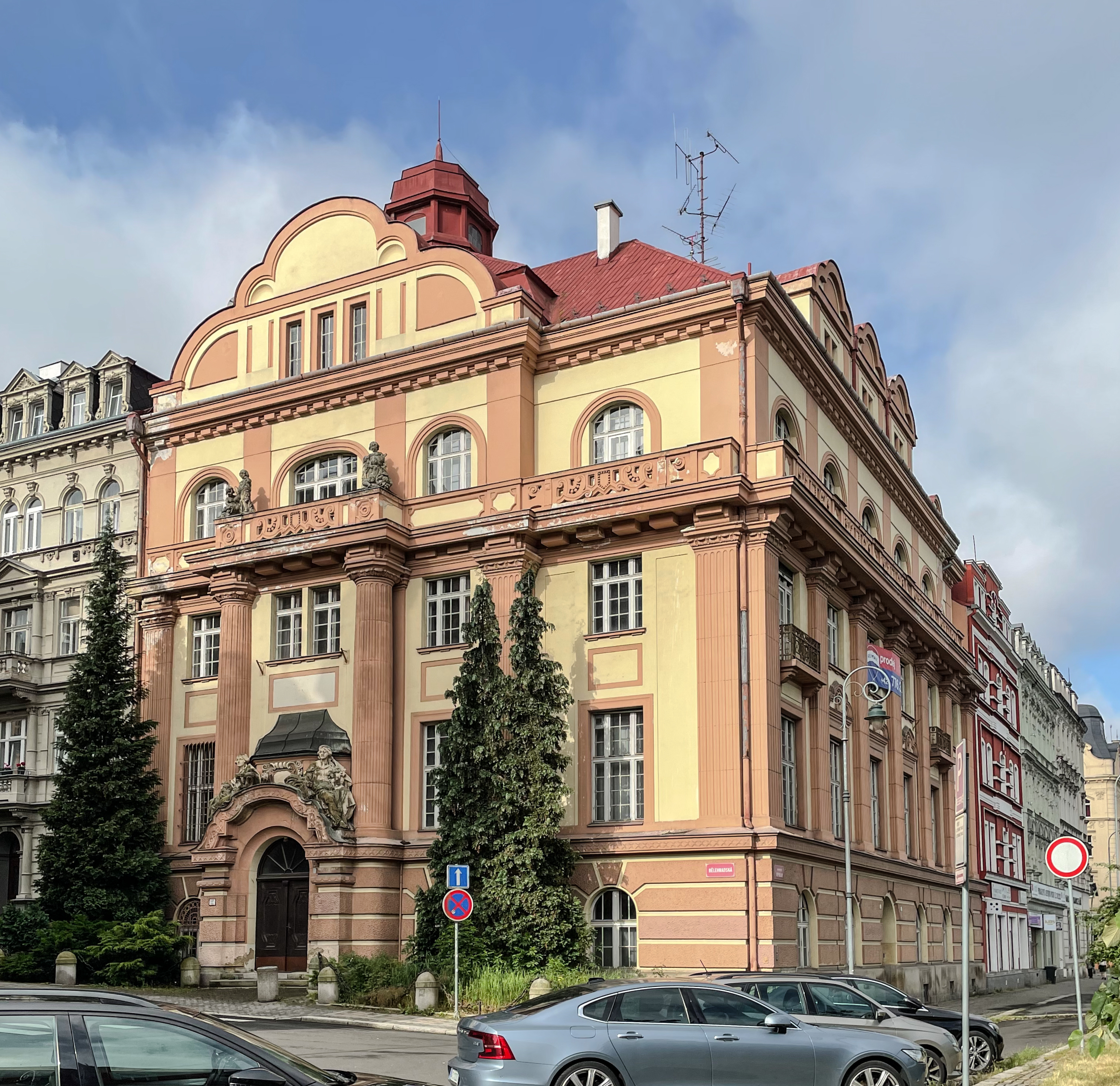
Former branch in Karlovy Vary (arch. Alfred Bayer, 1913), lately converted to residential use

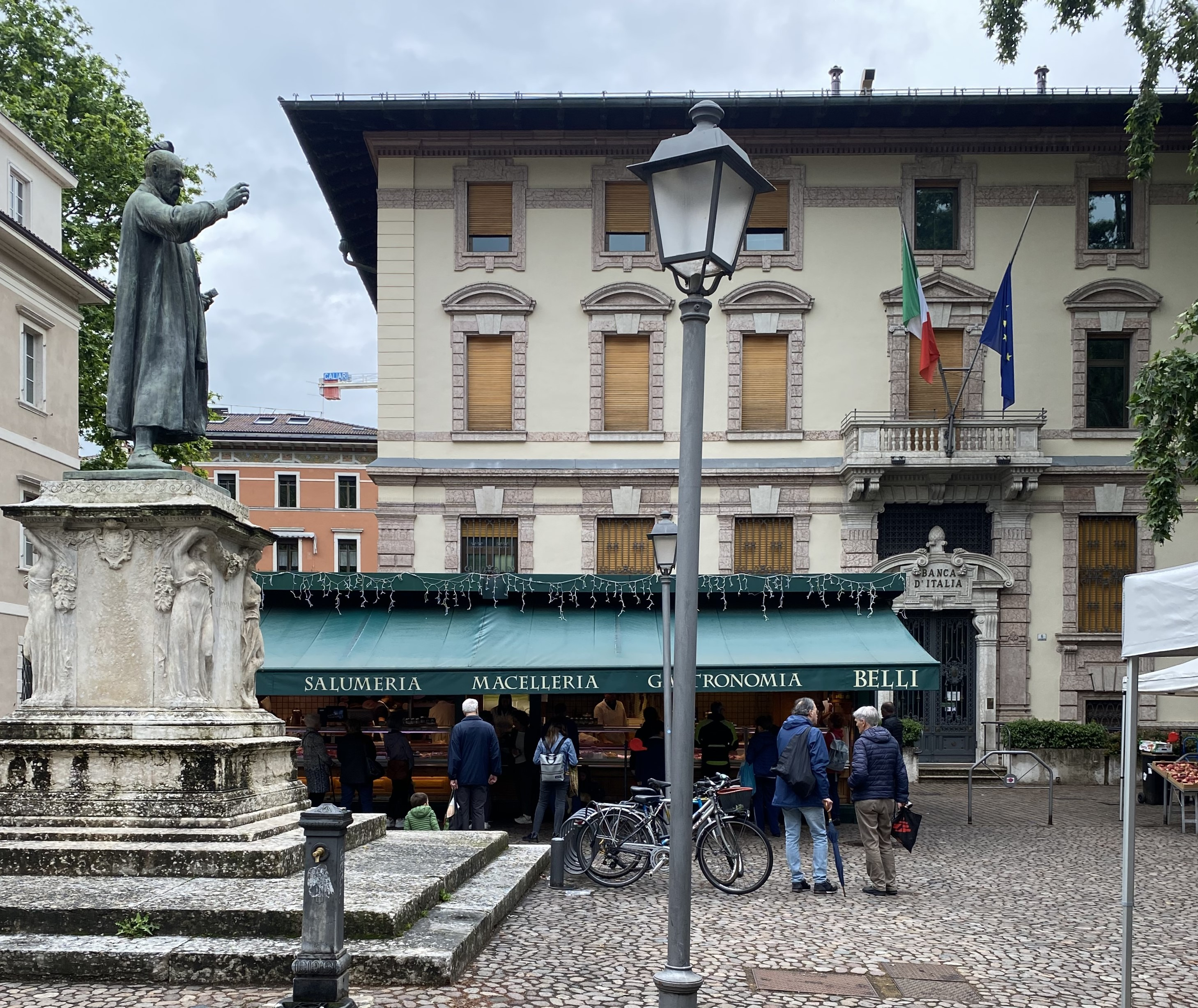
Former branch in Trento, lately branch of the Bank of Italy

=== Branches in the Kingdom of Hungary ===
Former branch in Nagykanizsa (arch. Josef Hubert, 1903)

Former branch in Cluj-Napoca (arch. Ignác Alpár, ca. 1904), lately seat of the Technical University

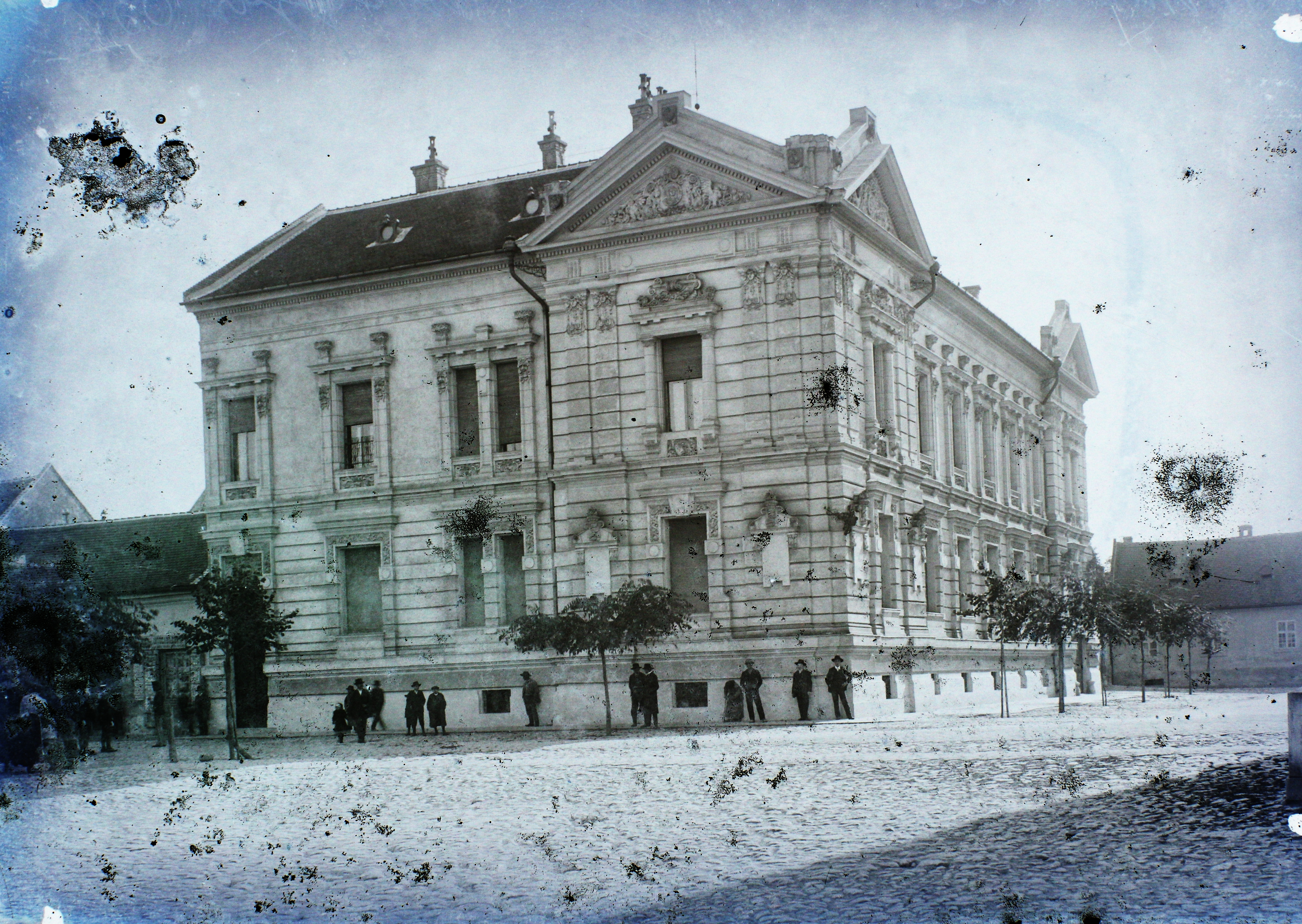
Former branch in Pančevo (1904), photographed around inauguration

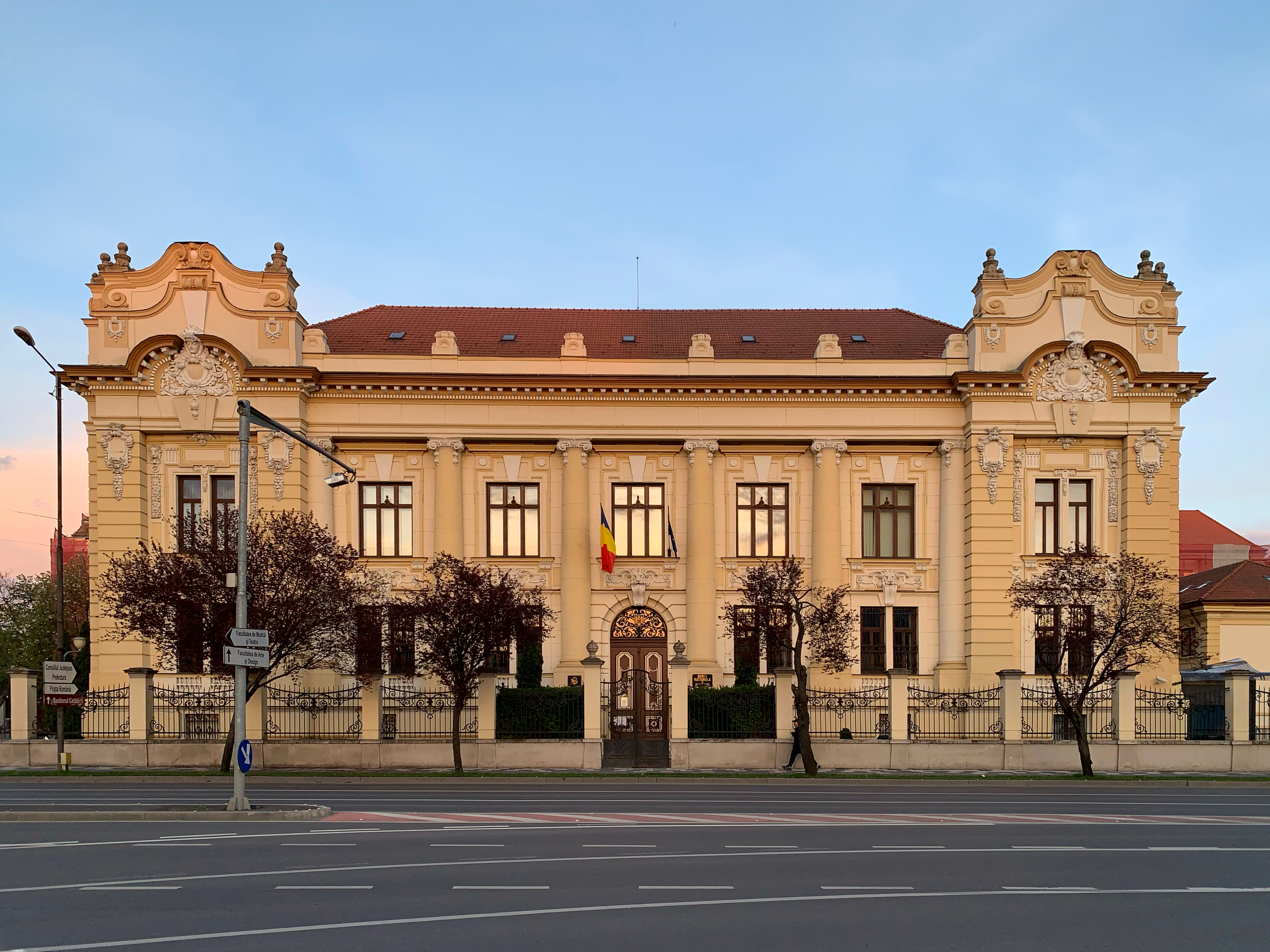
Former branch in Timișoara (arch. Josef Hubert, 1904), lately branch of the National Bank of Romania

Former branch in Brașov (arch. Josef Hubert, 1904), lately office of the prosecutor for the Court of Appeal of Brașov

Former branch in Sibiu (ca. 1909), lately seat of Sibiu County Council

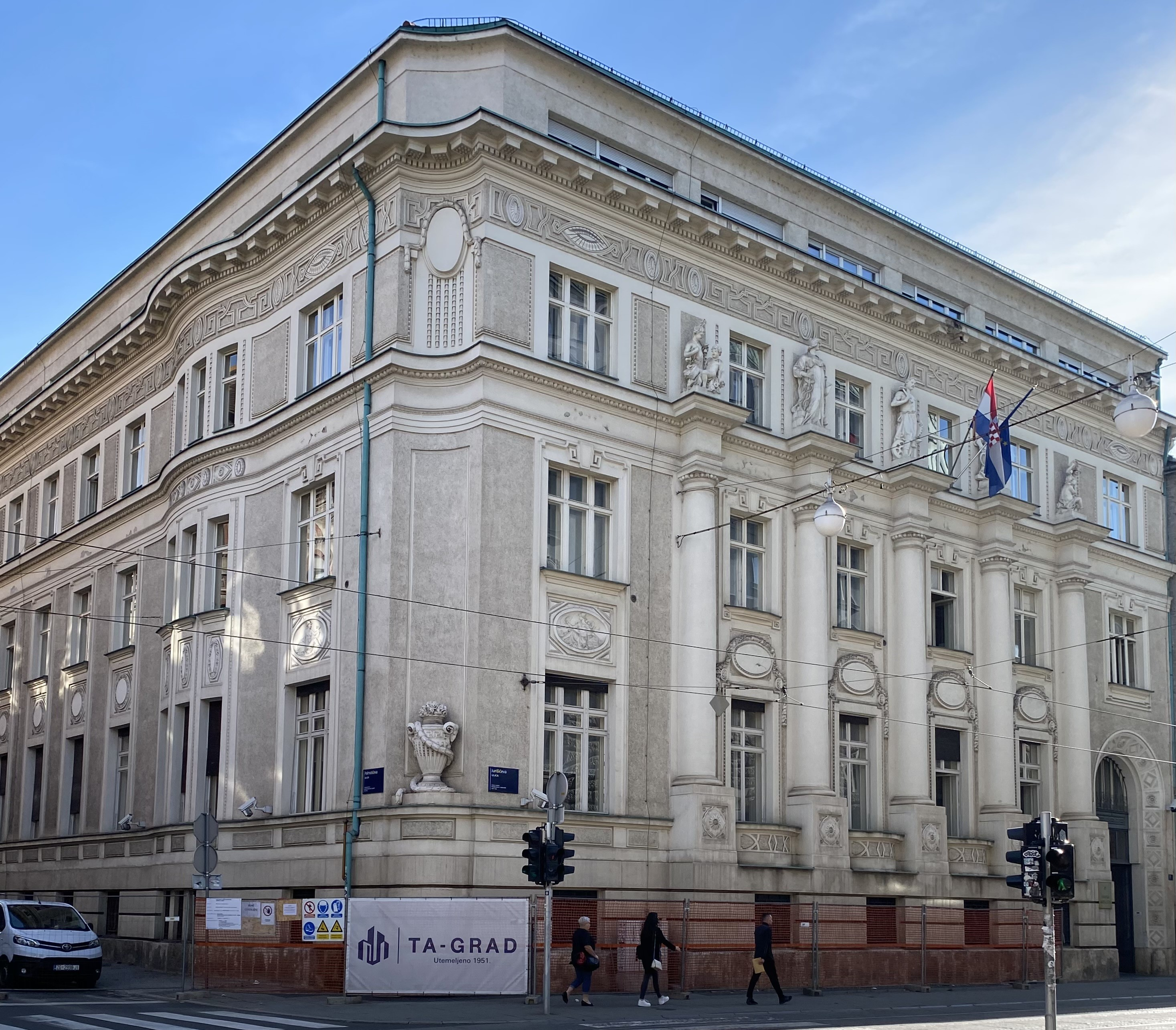
Former branch in Zagreb (arch. Lav Kalda, 1909), lately used by the Croatian National Bank

Former branch in Satu Mare (1910), lately seat of the Municipal Police Inspectorate

Former branch in Žilina (arch. Josef Hubert, 1912), repurposed 2017 as office and coworking spaces

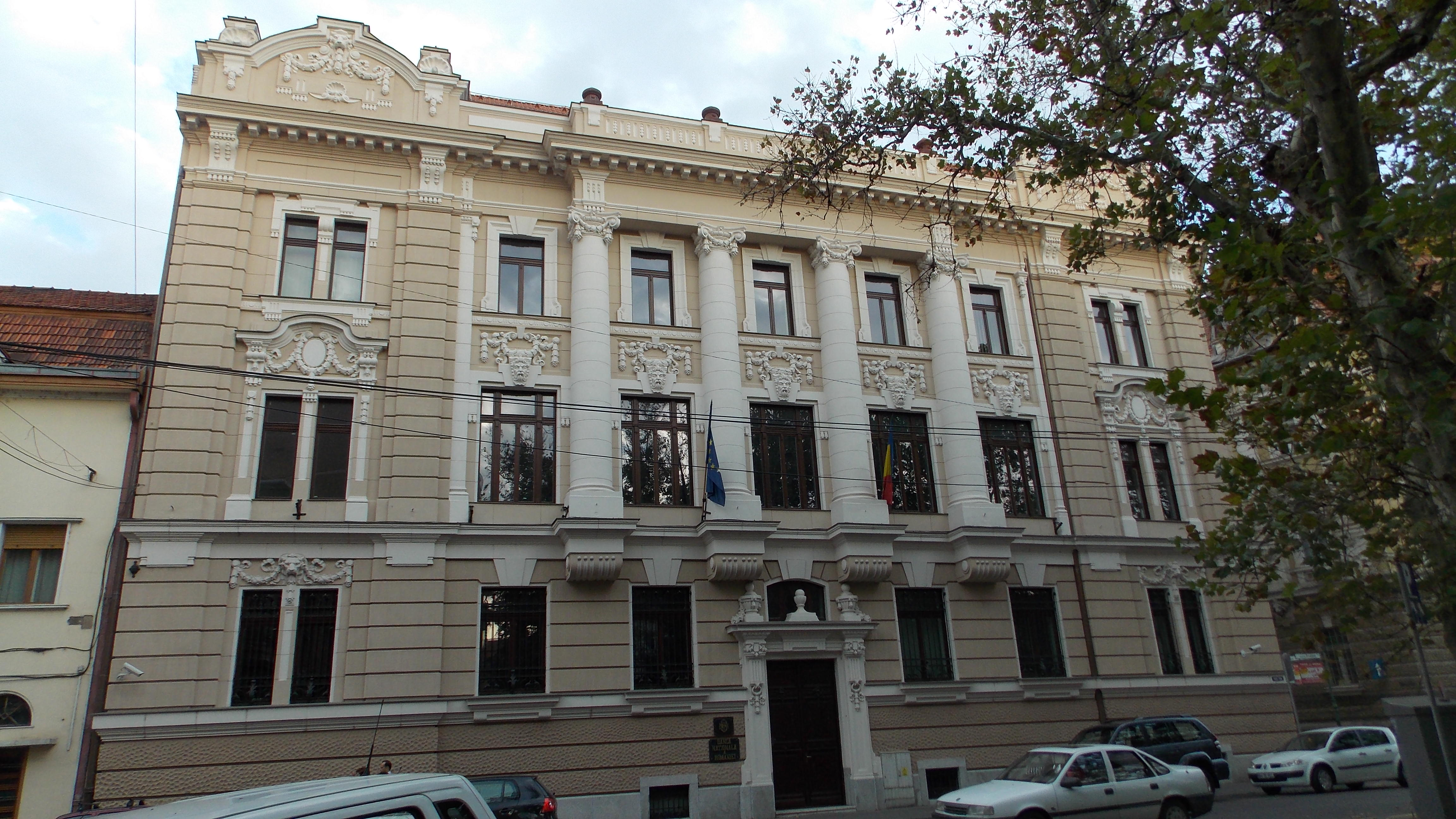
Former branch in Oradea (arch. Ignác Alpár, 1913), lately branch of the National Bank of Romania

Former branch in Bistrița, lately a post-secondary medical school

Former branch in Sighișoara, lately offices of the judiciary

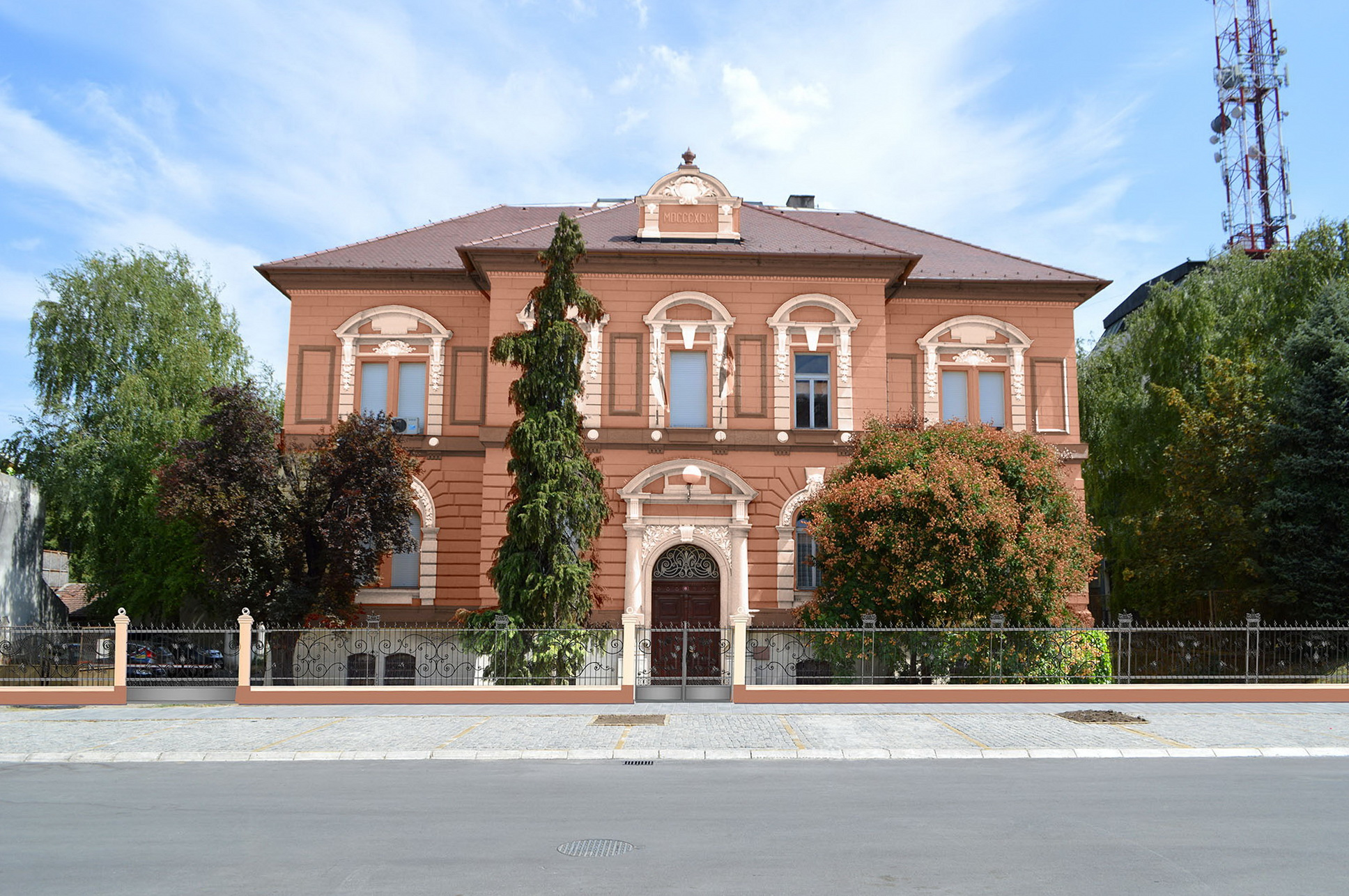
Former branch in Zrenjanin

=== Bosnia-Herzegovina ===
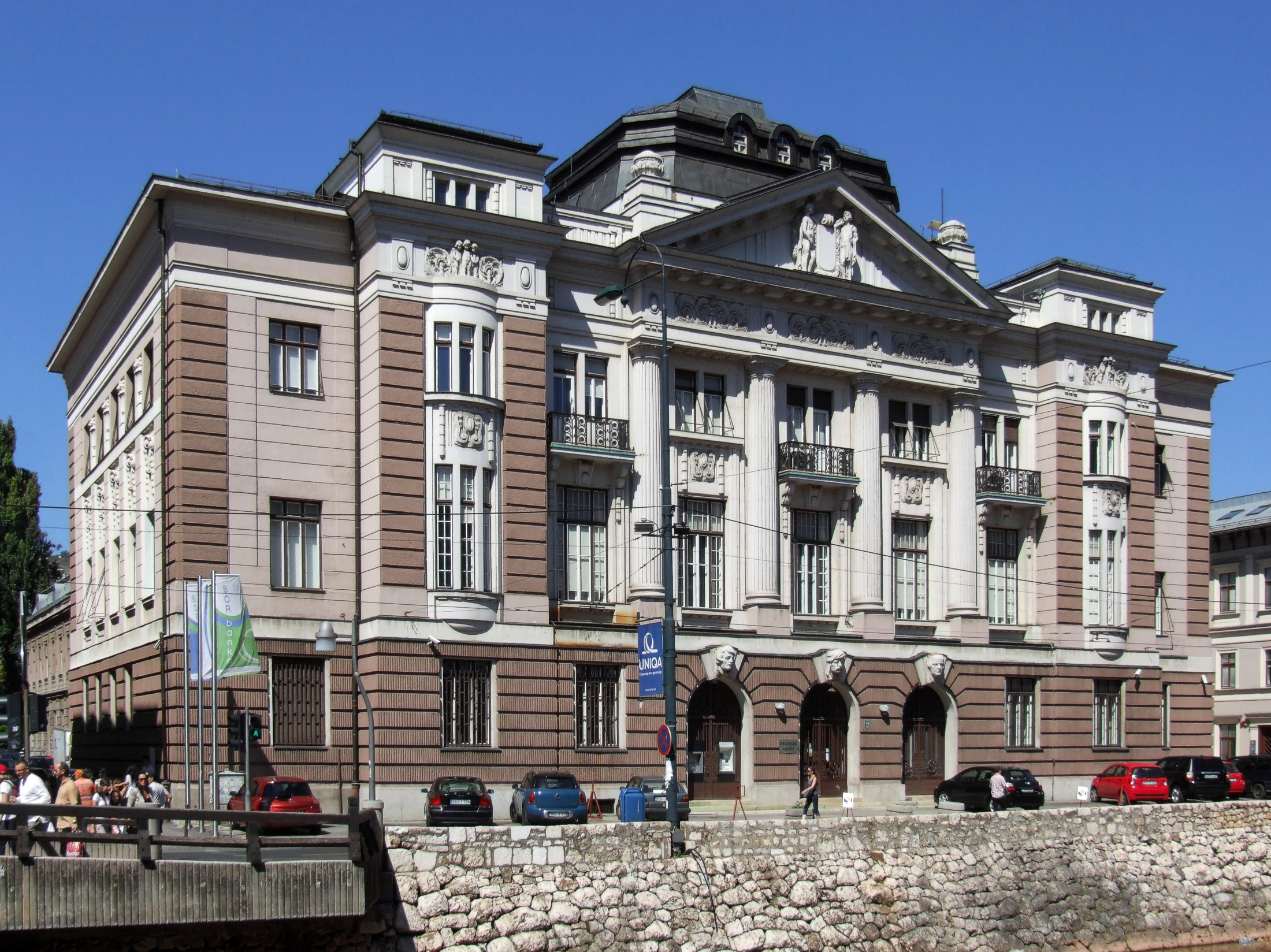
Former branch in Sarajevo

== See also ==
- State Bank of the Russian Empire
- Imperial Ottoman Bank
- Reichsbank
- List of banks in Austria
