= Palais Ferstel =

Building in Vienna, Austria

Coordinates: 48.2106°N 16.3656°E

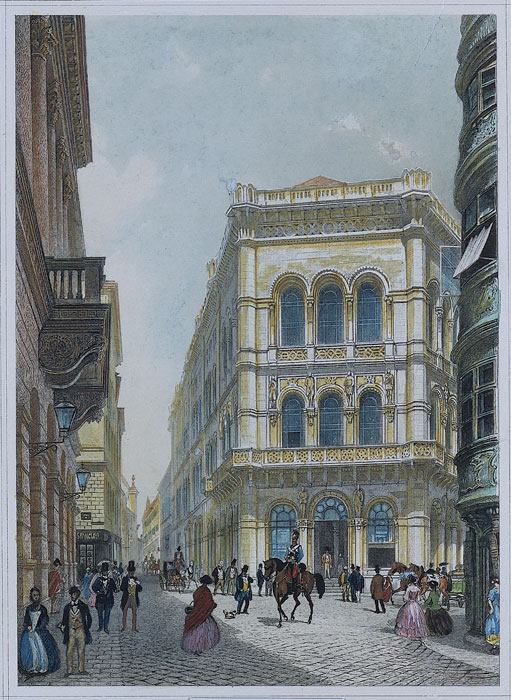
Palais Ferstel, Vienna

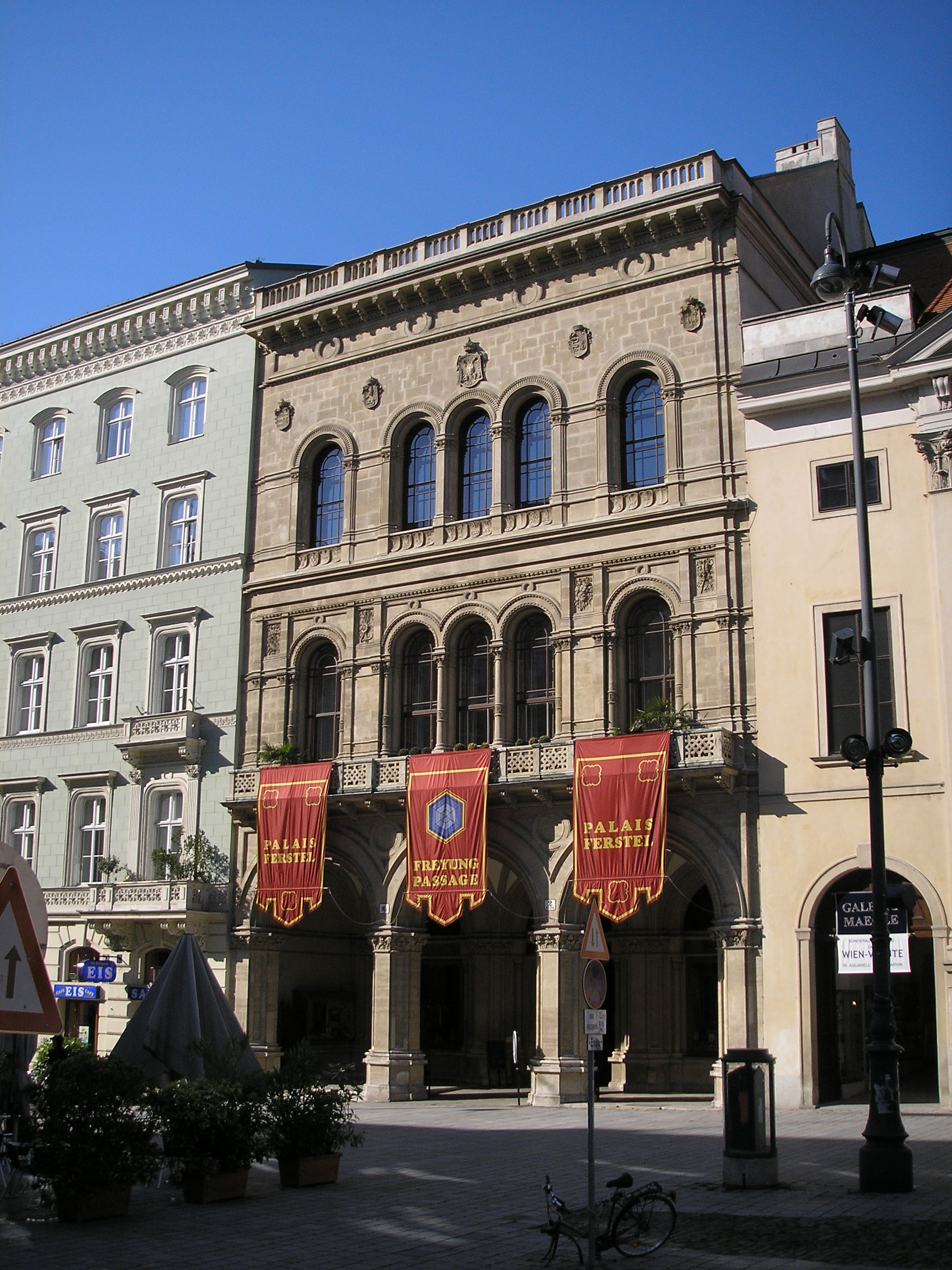
Palais Ferstel, Vienna

Palais Ferstel is a building located in Herrengasse street, in Vienna. It was originally built for the Austrian National Bank and stock exchange in 1860, and from 1878 served as head office of the Austro-Hungarian Bank. It was constructed by Baron Heinrich von Ferstel. The design of the building is reminiscent of early Florentine Renaissance architecture.

== History ==
During the World War II, the building was severely damaged from air raids, particularly its facade. In 1971, the President of the Federal Monuments Office, Walter Frodl, was responsible for its reconstruction. Between 1975 and 1982, the building became privately owned and was renovated. The building is currently owned by a 2015 Karl Wlaschek foundation.

== See also ==
- Herrengasse
