= Austro-Hungarian Bank, Ivano-Frankivsk =

Austro-Hungarian Bank
- Ukrainian: Австро-Угорський Банк; Polish: Bank Austriacko-Węgierski; German: Oesterreichisch-Ungarische Bank
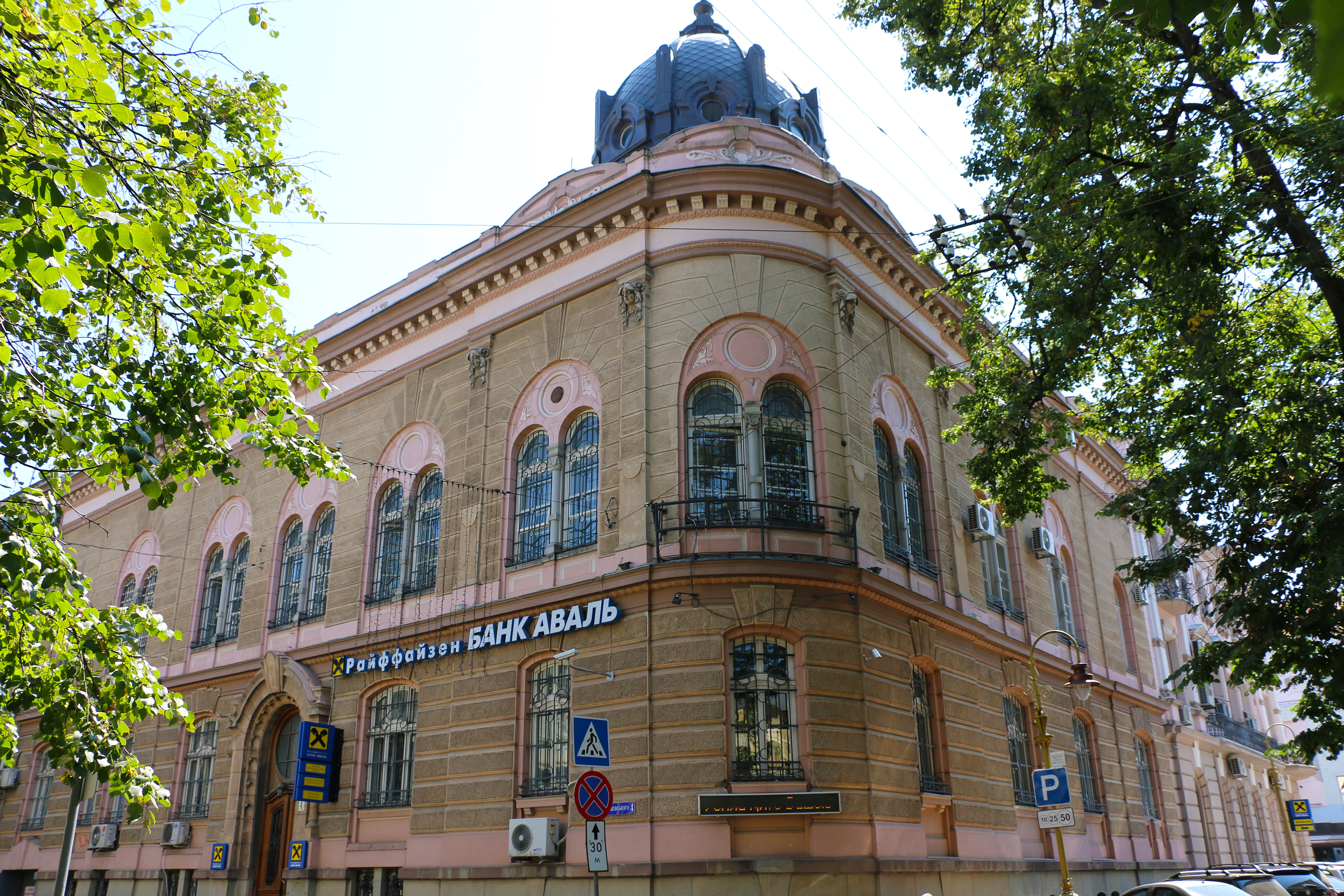
- Building of the bank, 2015.
- Interactive map of the Austro-Hungarian Bank area

General information
- Location: 4 Hrushevsky Street (Вул. Грушевського, 4), Ivano-Frankivsk, Ukraine
- Coordinates: 48°55′12″N 24°42′41″E
- Completed: 1907
- Owner: Raiffeisen Bank

Design and construction
- Architect: Jan Kudelski
- Main contractor: Selig Rubinstein's Construction Firm

The Building of the Austro-Hungarian Bank (Ukrainian: Будівля Австро-Угорського Банку; Polish: Gmach Banku Austriacko-Węgierskiego) in Ivano-Frankivsk, Ukraine, is an eclectic-style tenement constructed in 1907. Originally, it served a branch of the state-run Austro-Hungarian Bank.

Throughout the interbellum the building served a branch of the central bank of the Second Polish Republic—Bank Polski; Until Ukraine's independence, it served the State Bank of the USSR. Currently it houses a branch of the Austrian Raiffeisen Bank.

== History ==
=== Austro-Hungarian Bank in Stanisławów ===
The Austro-Hungarian Bank (German: Oesterreichisch-Ungarische Bank) was founded in 1878, following prolonged negotiations between Austria and Hungary, becoming an institute in which both parts of the Empire held equal shares. The bank enjoyed great trust from the residents of the empire, with its predecessor already having sown seeds in Galicia—in Lwów (1853) and Kraków (1855), respectively. Galicia emerged as a key financial region for the Austro-Hungarian Bank, with almost 50% of its mortgage business originating from branches in the province by the turn of the century.

In 1879 the bank opened a branch in Stanisławów (present-day Ivano-Frankivsk), making it the third oldest branch in Galicia after those in Lwów and Kraków. As with other branches, its primary role was to regulate monetary circulation and handle all major banking operations. Initially, the Stanisławów branch operated out of several rented rooms in the newly constructed tenement of Mark Landau, situated at the corner of present-day Viche Maidan and Bachynskyi Street. Starting in 1886, the operations of the branch extended to towns belonging to the districts of Bohorodczany, Buczacz, Dolina, Horodenka, Kałusz, Kołomyja, Kosów, Tłumacz, and Brzeżany. In 1900, with the establishment of an independent branch in Kołomyja, the jurisdiction of the Stanisławów branch was reduced by the transfer of the districts of Horodenka and Kosów to the new branch.

At the beginning of the 20th century the state purchased a plot of land situated at the beginning of 3 May Street (present-day Hrushevsky Street), originally a garden of the Szydłowski family, with the intent of constructing a branch building. Work commenced soon thereafter, headed by the Polish architect Jan Kudelski and carried out by Selig Rubinstein's Construction Firm. The building was completed in 1907, finalizing the development of the city's so-called "banking quarter," made up of four adjacent structures. The Austro-Hungarian Bank officially moved into the building on 11 April 1908. In 1918, the bank building received electricity.

Throughout its operation the bank's acting auditors included, among others, Hersz Angerman, Hercel Beral, Józef Borecki, Zbigniew Cieński, Jan Czechowski, Józef Fiedler, Kajetan Kopacz, Markus Wolf Landau, Piotr Sedelmajer, and Mojżesz Seinfeld.

=== Subsequent occupants ===
Following the dissolution of the Austro-Hungarian Empire, the nascent Second Polish Republic inherited many of the former state's institutions. Accordingly, Bank Polski, serving as the republic's central bank, moved into the building of liquidated Austro-Hungarian Bank. In the early 1930s, apartments were installed in the attic of the building's left wing. During this time, the operating room occupied three corner rooms on the second floor, while the director's apartment was situated directly beneath the hall on the first floor. Until 1938, the bank's Stanisławów branch was managed by Marian Goetz, later being replaced by Mr. Krabiński. The deputy director, a watchman, and a courier resided in the tenement.

The collapse of the Polish institution came in September 1939. Under Soviet administration, the building was repurposed to house a branch of the State Bank of the USSR, which remained in operation until Ukraine's independence. For a brief period thereafter, it served as a branch of the Ukrainian state bank before being sold in 2003 to the Austrian Raiffeisen Bank, which continues to occupy the premises today.
