= Heinrich von Ferstel =

Austrian architect (1828–1883)

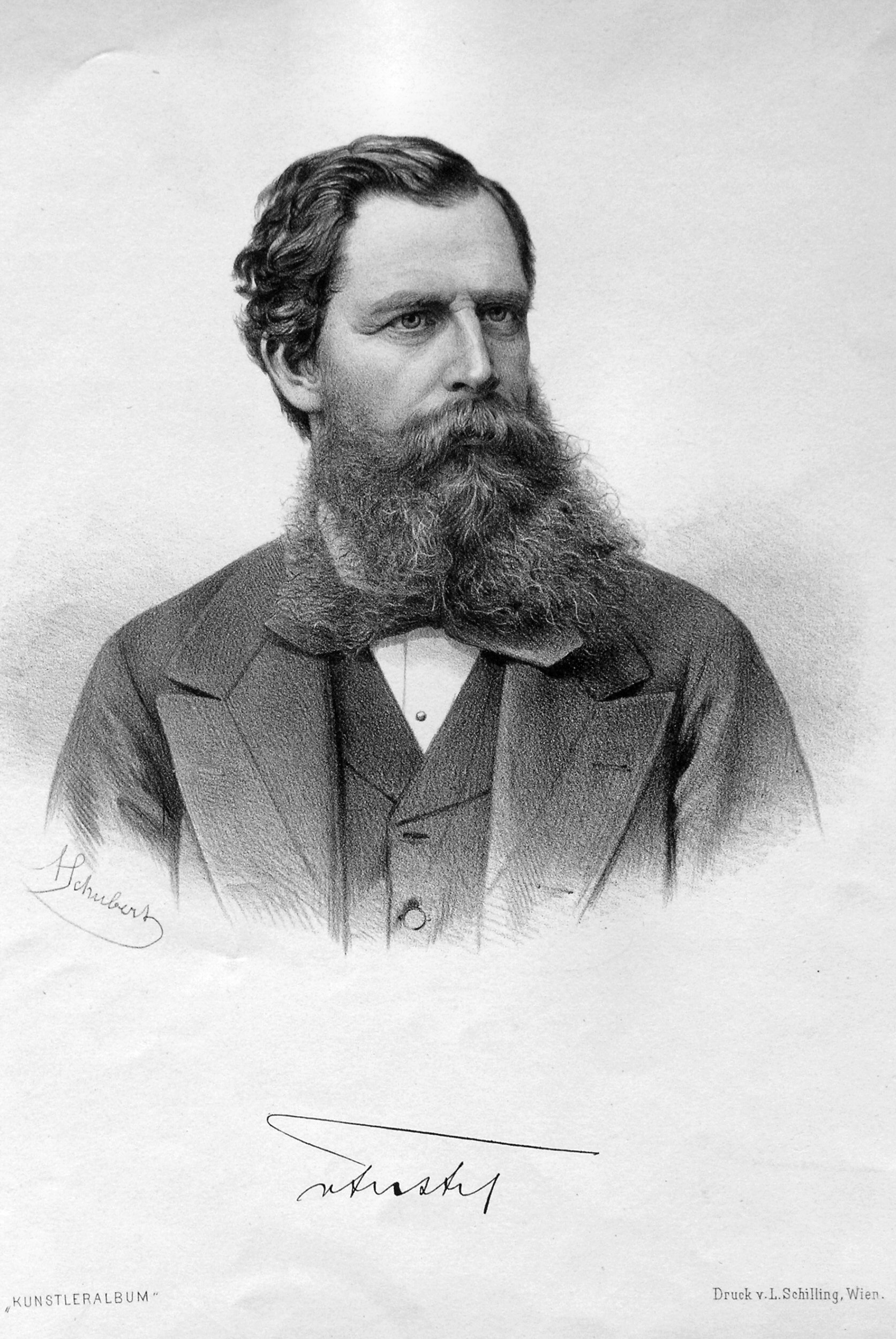
- Lithograph c. 1880
- Born: Johann Heinrich Ferstel; 7 July 1828; Vienna, Austrian Empire
- Died: 14 July 1883 (aged 55); Grinzing, Austria-Hungary
- Occupation: Architect
- Spouse: Lotte Ferstel née Fehlmann
- Children: 2
- Awards: Royal Gold Medal (1882)
- Buildings: Votive Church, Vienna; Gymnasium Wasagasse; Museum of Applied Arts, Vienna; Church of St. James (Brno); Villa Wartholz; University of Applied Arts Vienna; Palazzo del Lloyd Austriaco, Trieste; Main Building of the Vienna University

Freiherr Heinrich von Ferstel (7 July 1828 – 14 July 1883) was an Austrian architect and professor, who played a vital role in building late 19th-century Vienna.

== Life ==
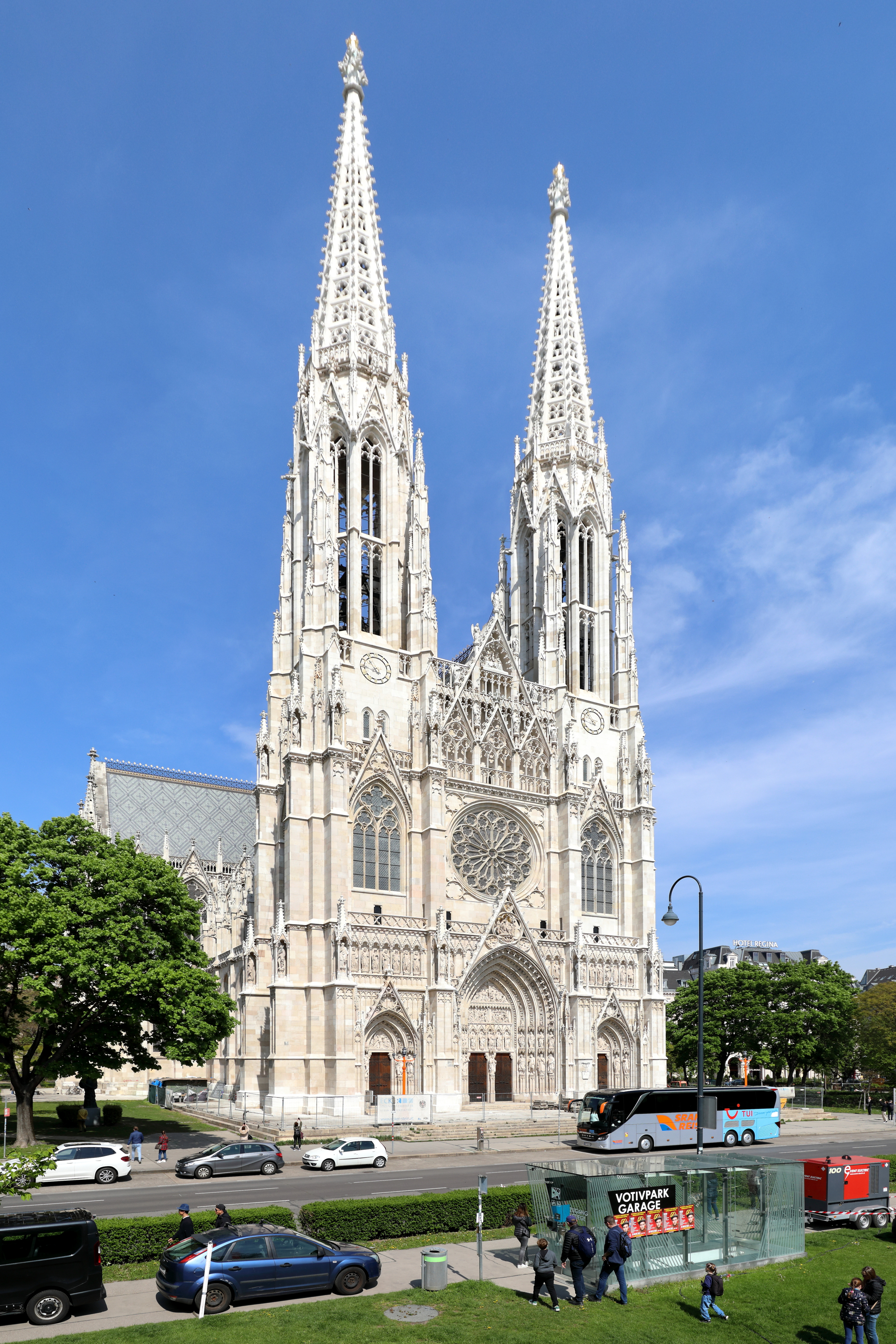
Votivkirche, Vienna

The son of Ignaz Ferstel (1796–1866), a bank clerk and later director of the Austrian national bank in Prague, Heinrich Ferstel, after wavering for some time between the different arts, finally decided on architecture. From 1847 he studied at the Academy of Fine Arts Vienna under Eduard van der Nüll and August Sicard von Sicardsburg. After several years during which he was in disrepute because of his part in the 1848 Revolution, he finished his studies in 1850 and entered the atelier of his uncle, Friedrich August von Stache, where he worked at the votive altar for the chapel of St. Barbara in St. Stephen's Cathedral, Vienna and co-operated in the restoration and construction of many castles, chiefly in Bohemia. Journeys of some length into Germany, Belgium, Holland, and England confirmed his tendency towards Romanticism. It was in Italy, however, where he was sent as a bursar in 1854, that he was converted to the Renaissance style of architecture, and his admiration for Bramante. He began to use polychromy by means of Graffito decoration and terracotta. This device, adapted from the Early Renaissance and intended to convey a fuller sense of life, he employed later in the Austrian Museum of Applied Arts.

While still in Italy he was awarded the prize in the competition for the Votive Church (Votivkirche) in Vienna (1855) over 74 contestants. He built it between 1856 and 1879. After his death it was proposed by Sir Tatton Sykes as a model for the new Westminster Cathedral in London. Another of Ferstel's monumental works belonging to the same period is the head office of the Austrian National Bank and stock exchange in Vienna, in the style of the Early Renaissance (1856–60), known as the Palais Ferstel. Designing public buildings in the inner city and Ringstrasse area, the expansion of the city of Vienna enabled Ferstel, with Rudolf Eitelberger, to develop civic architecture along artistic lines (Burgomaster's residence, Stock Exchange 1859). At the same time he had also the opportunity of putting his ideas into practice in a number of private dwellings and villas in Brünn and Vienna.

The more important buildings designed during his later years (passing over the churches at Schonau near Teplitz, really products of his earlier activity) are the palace of Archduke Ludwig Victor, his winter palace in Klessheim, the palace of Prince Johann II of Liechtenstein in the Rossau near Vienna, the palace of the Austro-Hungarian Lloyd's, in Trieste, but above all the Austrian Museum for Applied Art (completed in 1871), with its imposing arcaded court. Next comes the University of Vienna (1871–84). He was also an author of the project of the reconstruction in the Neo-Gothic style the evangelical Church's of Saviour in Bielsko (1881–1882). Through a technical error his design for the Berlin Reichstag building received no award. In 1866 Ferstel was appointed professor at the Polytechnic School, in 1871 chief government inspector of public works and in 1879 was raised to the rank of Freiherr.

== Sources ==
Attribution
