= Hrushevsky Street (Ivano-Frankivsk) =

Street in Ivano-Frankivsk, Ukraine

Coordinates: 48°55′17″N 24°42′50″E

Mykhailo Hrushevsky Street
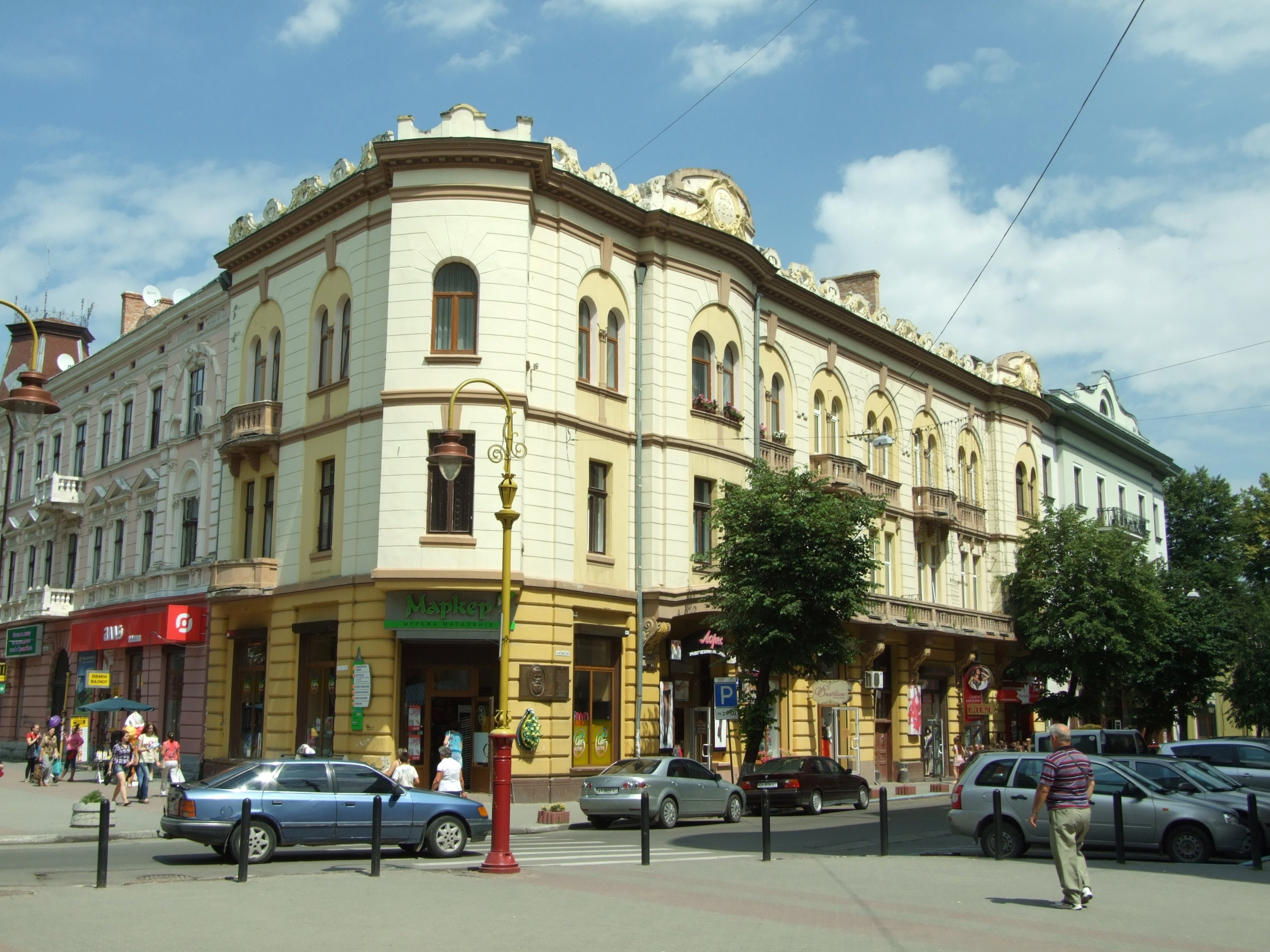
- Interactive map of Mykhailo Hrushevsky Street
- Native name: Вулиця Грушевського (Ukrainian)
- Former name(s): Zabolotow Street; Third May Street; Karl Marks Street
- Length: 820 m (2,690 ft)
- Addresses: 3 Cinema theater "Lumier"; 21 State Administration (Bily Dim); 31 Institute of Forestry; 34A National Bank branch
- Location: Central Ivano-Frankivsk, Ukraine
- west end: Sotnyk Martynets Street
- Major junctions: Kurbas Street; Shashkevych Street; Vahylevych Street; Melnychuk Street; Shpytalna Street; Valova Street; Street of Vasylyanok
- north end: Hryunwaldska Street

Mykhailo Hrushevsky Street (Ukrainian: Вулиця Грушевського) is one of the most important streets located in Ivano-Frankivsk. It runs along several government institutions such as regional and city administration Bily Dim as well as the city's branch of the National Bank of Ukraine.

== Description ==
The street has non-traditional form as it bends about ninety degrees. It starts at the western portion of the Mickiewicz Square and at first runs parallel to Nezalezhnist Street (stometrivka) then makes a wide turn northward towards the city's Railway Terminal. It ends at the intersection of Gryunwaldska Street, Harkusha Street, and Street of Vasylyanok. Its extension towards the Railway Terminal serves Gryunwaldska Street. The street has a both way single lane traffic from Vahylevych Street to Gryunwaldska Street. For the most part the street here has wider sidewalks. From the start to Vahylevych Street, Hrushevsky Street has a one way traffic in the eastern direction. The street here is narrower with a roadside parking allowed and small sidewalks on both sides.

== Background overview ==
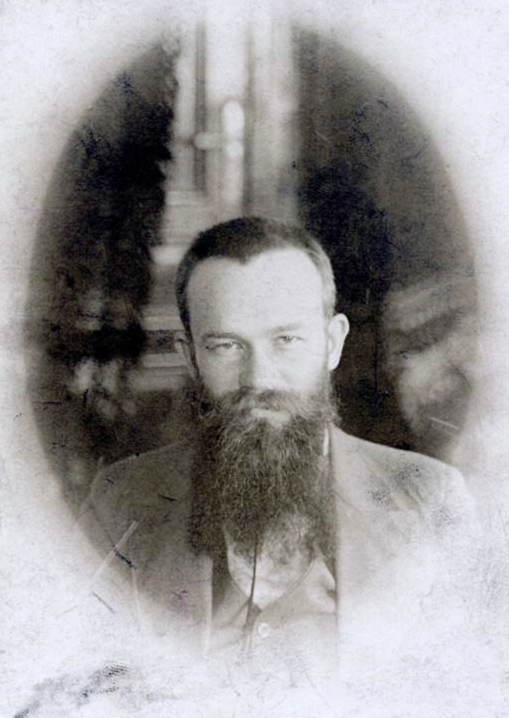
Mykhailo Hrushevsky

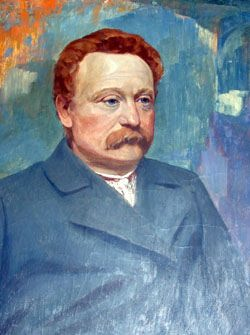
Ivan Franko

Until 1892 it carried the name of Ulica Zabolotowska after the village that once stood before the city was built here. In 1892 it was named Ulica trzeciego maja (Street of the 3rd May) after the Polish Constitution adopted on May 3, 1791. Around 1919 it also carried name of Ivan Franko (today - another street). During the Soviet times the street was renamed into Karl Marks Street until 1991. After the establishment of the Ukrainian independence on September 29, 1991, it was renamed into Hrushevsky Street at the 125th birthday anniversary of Mykhailo Hrushevsky. Since then every year on September 29 various festivities take place near the administration building Bily Dim.

On this street was born a well-known Austrian opera singer Ira Malaniuk (1923–2009). In 1993 here in the Bily Dim took place the 1st Hutsul Congress. Along the street also is located cinema theater "Lumier", few buildings of the Medical University, the Ukrainian Scientific-Research Institute of Mountain Forestry, building of a former school among the teachers of which was a Ukrainian writer Dmytro Makohon, father of Iryna Vilde.

== Addresses ==
- Number 3 Cinema theater "Lumier"
- Number 4 Former building of the Austro-Hungarian Bank; currently serving Raiffeisen Bank.
- Number 16 city's General Education School #7
- Number 18 "Prosvita" Building
- Number 18A Building of the city's Russian community
- Number 21 State Administration Building (Bily Dim)
- Number 31 Institute of Forestry
- Number 34A National Bank branch

== Places of interest ==
- Cinema theater "Lumier"
- Monument to unification of the Western Ukraine with the rest of Ukraine
- Park "Valy"
- Mickiewicz Park
- "Bily Dim"
