= Barvitius =

Barvitius is a surname. Notable people with the surname include:

- Antonín Viktor Barvitius (1823–1901), Czech architect
- Karel Barvitius (1864–1937), Czech publisher of books and music
- Viktor Barvitius (1834–1902), Czech painter

== See also ==
- Barvitus (fl. 545), Scottish saint
