= Rotunda of the Finding of the Holy Cross =

Coordinates: 50°4′58.2″N 14°24′53″E

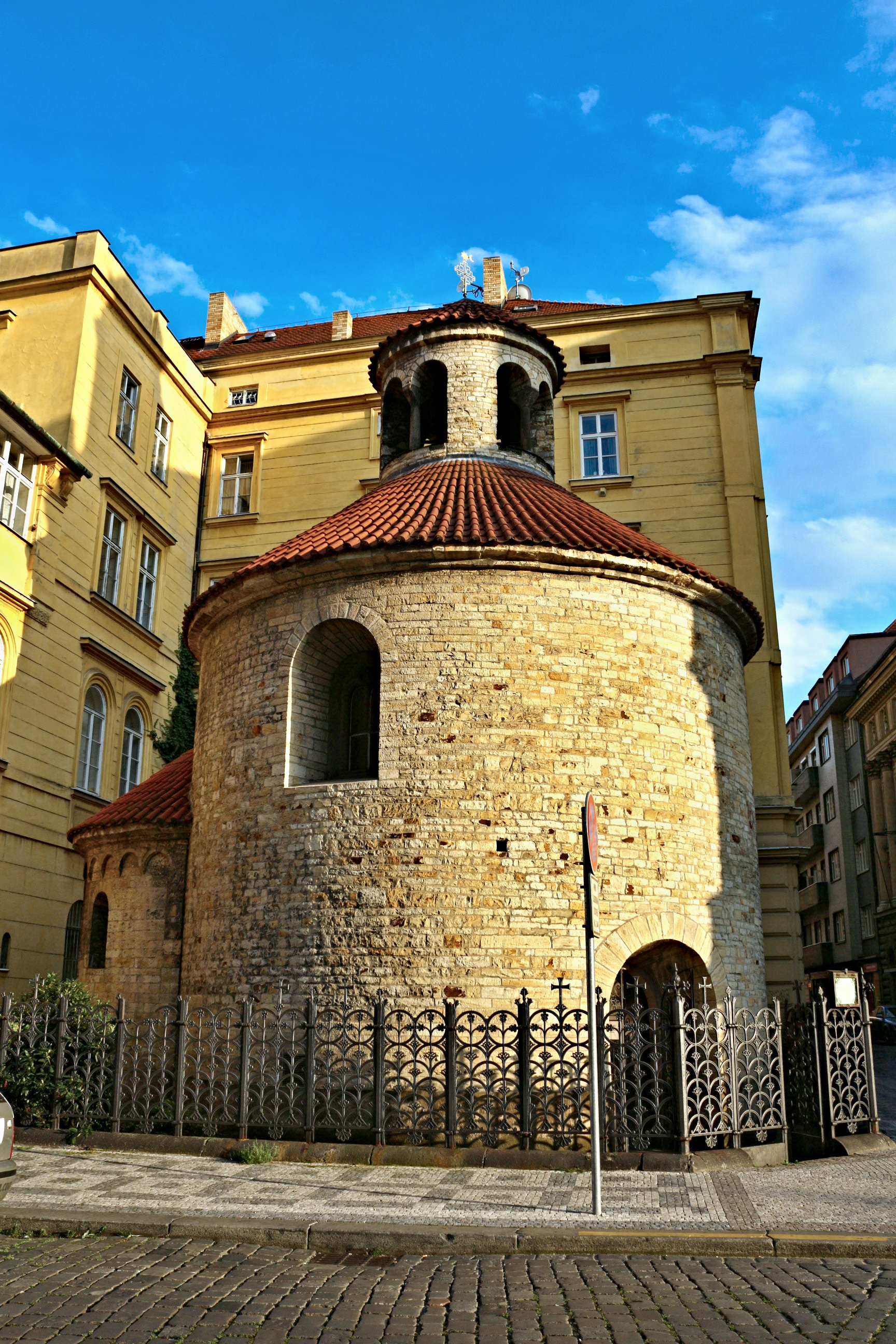
Rotunda of the Finding of the Holy Cross

Rotunda of the Finding of the Holy Cross (Czech: Rotunda svatého Kříže Menšího) is a Romanesque rotunda in Prague 1, Old Town quarter, on the crossing of Konviktská and Karolíny Světlé street. Its founding is considered after 1125.

== Architecture ==
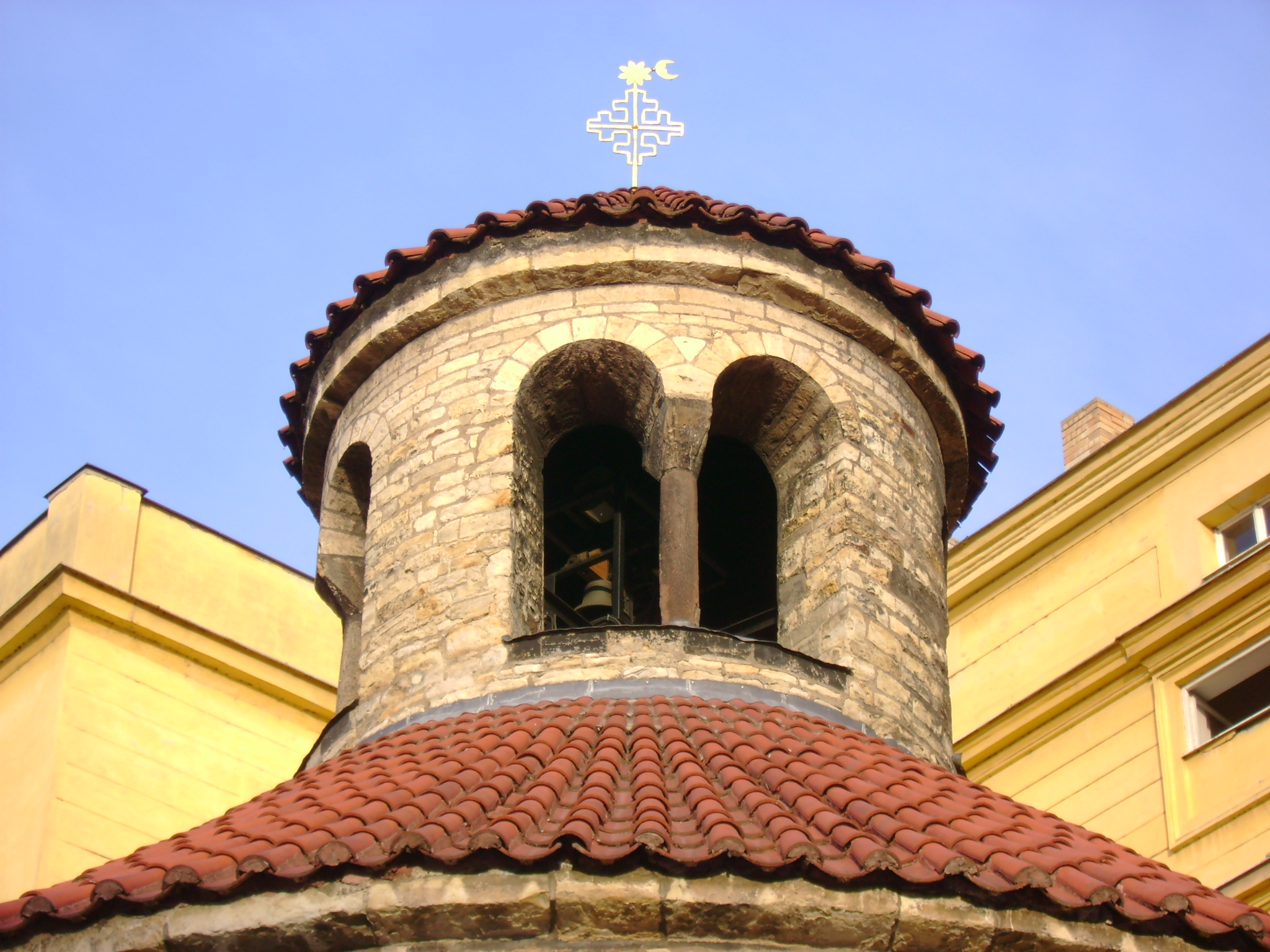
Roof lantern with the cross

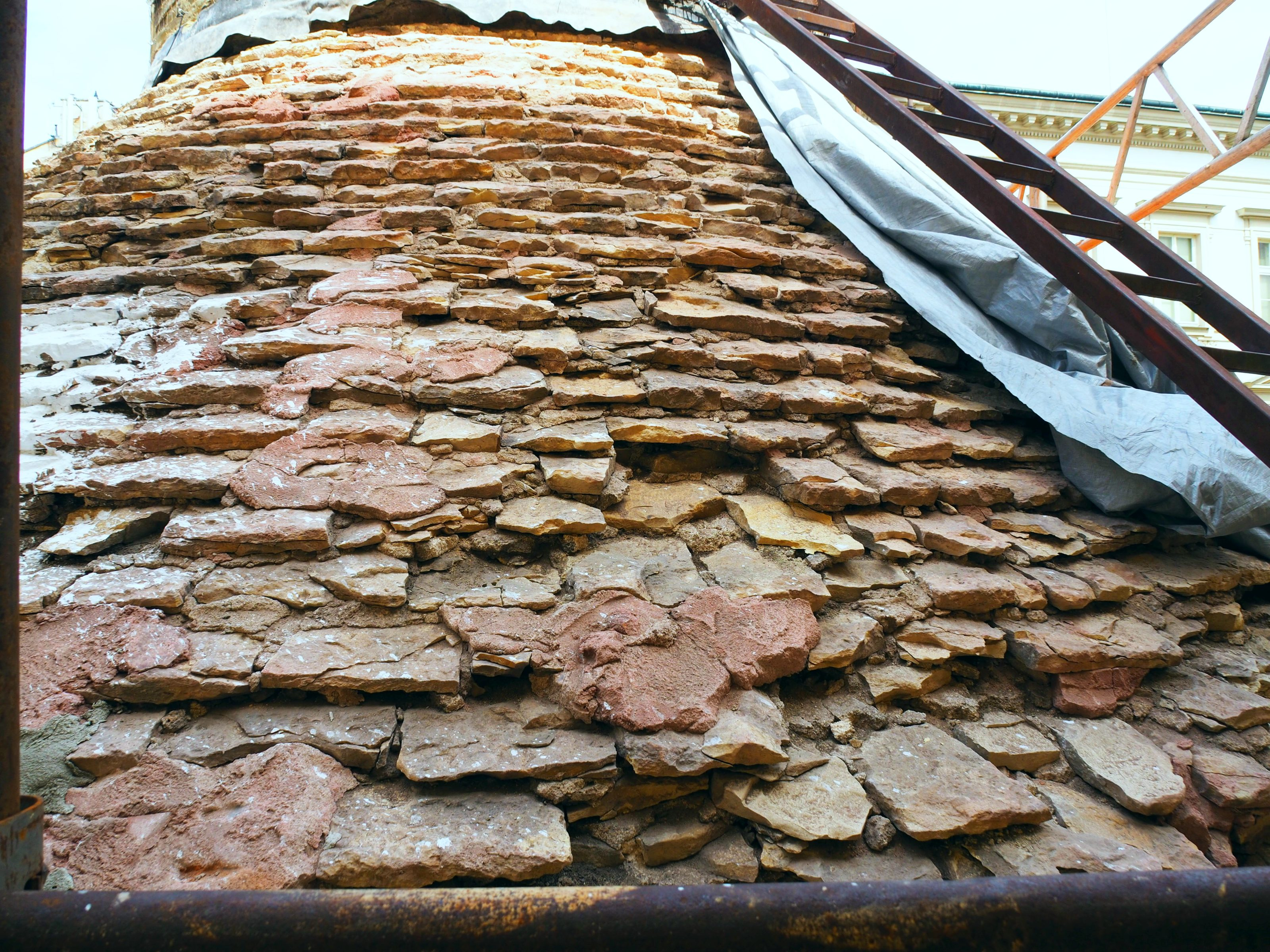
Stone (marl) roofing (12th century), discovered in 2022

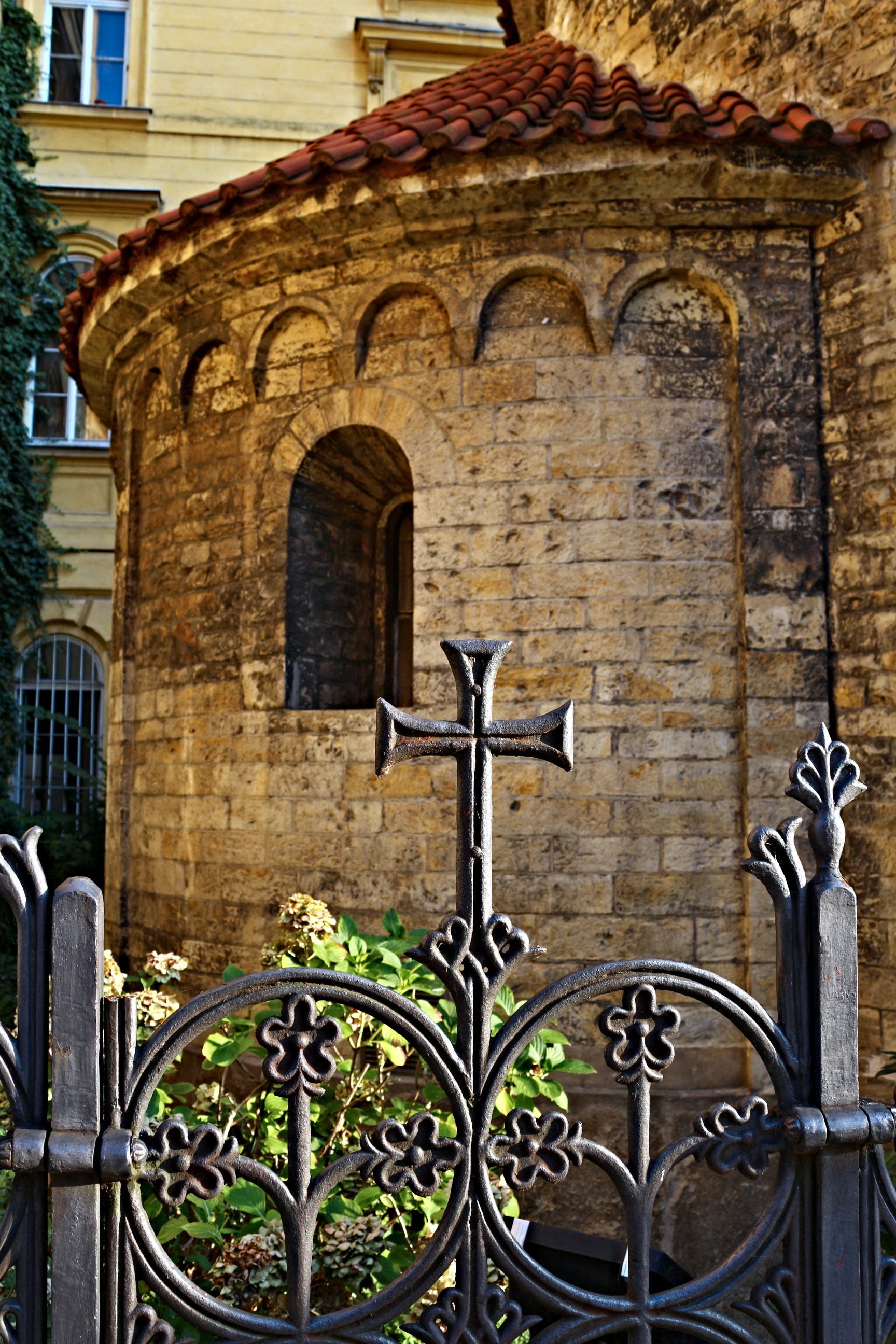
Apse

Small and simple building made of smaller marlite stones cut in rows consists of a round nave vaulted into a dome with a roof lantern, and half-round apse at the Eastern side. Apse is decorated by an arched frieze. At the top, there is a lantern with compound Romanesque windows, with, at the very top, gold-plated cross, crescent moon, and an eight-pointed star. Six-sided Romanesque ceramic tiles with a griffin of Vyšehrad type were discovered on the floor, a silver coin (denarius) from 1018 of Prince Jaromír from the Přemyslid dynasty was found near the rotunda in the 19th century. Romanesque marl roofing was discovered during restoration work in 2022.

== History ==
The first written mention comes from 1365, when the rotunda was a parish church, but the building is much older. It was built on an important trade route that led from Vyšehrad to the Vltava River crossings. It is possible that it originally belonged to one of the old town mansions as a private sanctuary. There was a presbytery nearby, which had disappeared during the Hussite wars, and a cemetery was around the church building.

In 1625, the rotunda was given to the Dominicans of the Old Town Monastery by the Church of St. Giles. In 1784, under the reign of Joseph II the sanctuary was shut down as part of ecclesial reforms, and the chapel became a warehouse. In 1860 there were plans to tear down the church due to construction of a new house. By the initiative of Ferdinand Bretislav Mikovec and Josef Mánes, the Umělecká beseda organisation intervened to save the building, and they succeeded. Town council bought the rotunda from a private owner, and architect Vojtěch Ignác Ullmann committed to restore the exterior for no reward. Ullmann also designed an altar, decorated by the painter Jan Popelík. Josef Mánes designed the grills around the rotunda.

At present, the rotunda is in use by the Old Catholic Church in Czech Republic and it is administered by Prague Old Catholic parish. Regular worship services are held here.
