= Schebek Palace =

Building in Prague, Czech Republic

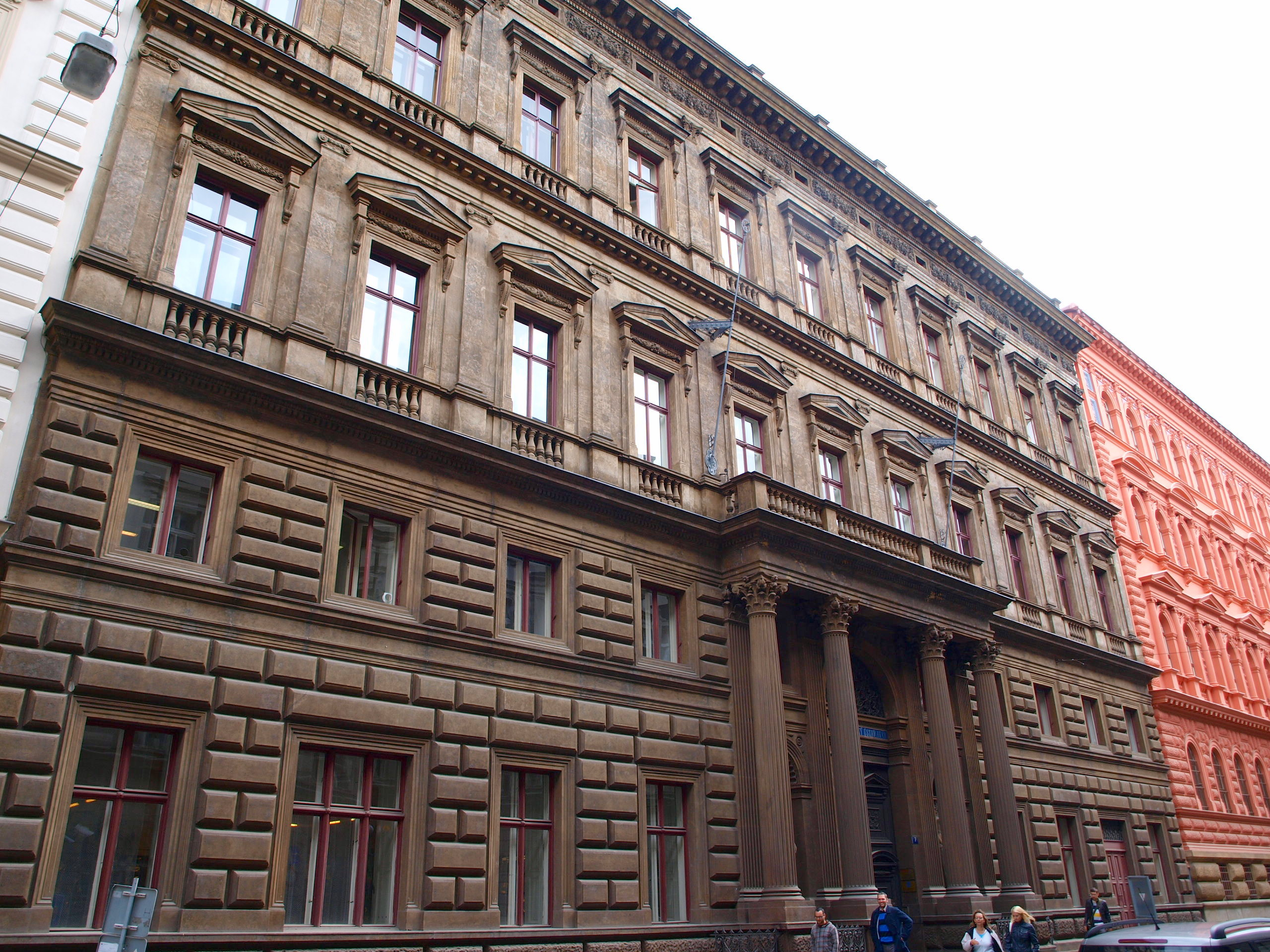
- Schebek Palace
- Interactive map of the Schebek Palace area

General information
- Architectural style: Renaissance Revival architecture
- Location: Politických vězňů 7 Prague 1 Czech Republic
- Coordinates: 50.0833333°N 14.4291667°E
- Current tenants: CERGE-EI
- Completed: 1872

Design and construction
- Architect: Ignác Ullman

Website
- schebekpalace.com

Schebek Palace (Czech: Schebkův palác), otherwise known as "The House of the Angel", is a neo-renaissance building located at Politických vězňů 7, čp. 936/II, in New Town, Prague 1. It is protected as a cultural monument in the Czech Republic.

== History ==
Prior to the construction of the current Palace, the building lot was occupied by an orphanage. It was sold to two railway magnates, Jan Schebek and František Ringhoffer, in 1868. Jan Schebek then commissioned architect Vojtěch Ignác Ullmann to design the current building. Ullmann's designs were inspired by renaissance Rome, and the building was constructed between 1870 and 1872. Originally designed to be three stories tall, additional floors have been added since the original construction. The building has four wings, with a rectangular courtyard in its center. Of special note are its ceiling murals by Viktor Barvitius, sculptures by Josef Wagner, and the building's marble staircase which leads to the first floor's main reception rooms.

The Schebek family owned the building for 18 years before selling it to the Austro-Hungarian Bank, where it became the headquarters of the Prague branch of the bank. Following World War I, the building became the headquarters of The Banking Office of the Ministry of Finance in 1919, which was later transformed into the National Bank of Czechoslovakia in 1926. The bank owned the building until 1963, when it was taken over by the Czechoslovak Academy of Sciences (CSAS).

Currently the building houses the Center for Economics Research and Graduate Education – Economics Institute (CERGE-EI), and it is owned by a unit of the Czech Academy of Sciences.

== Gallery ==
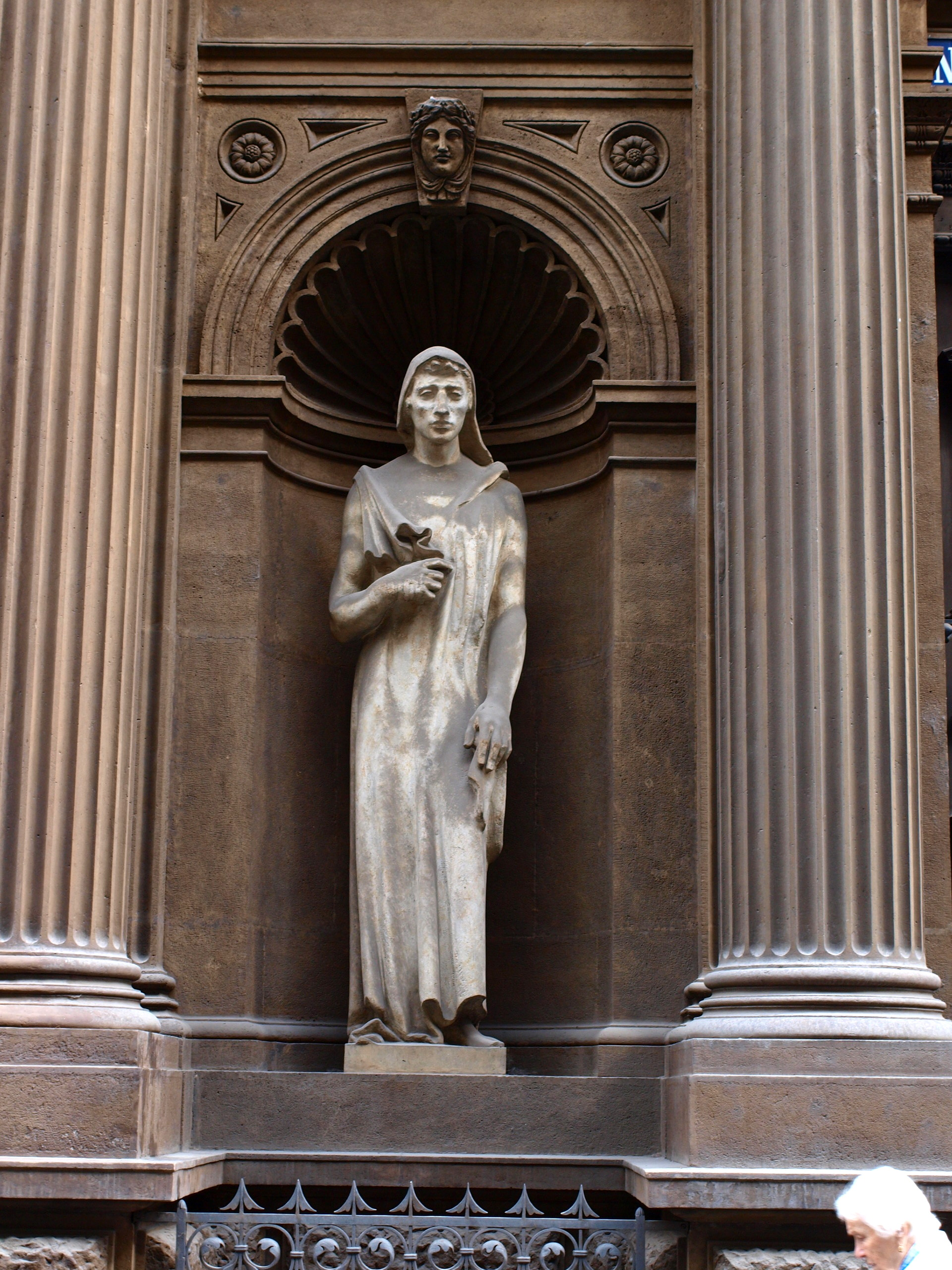
Sculpture

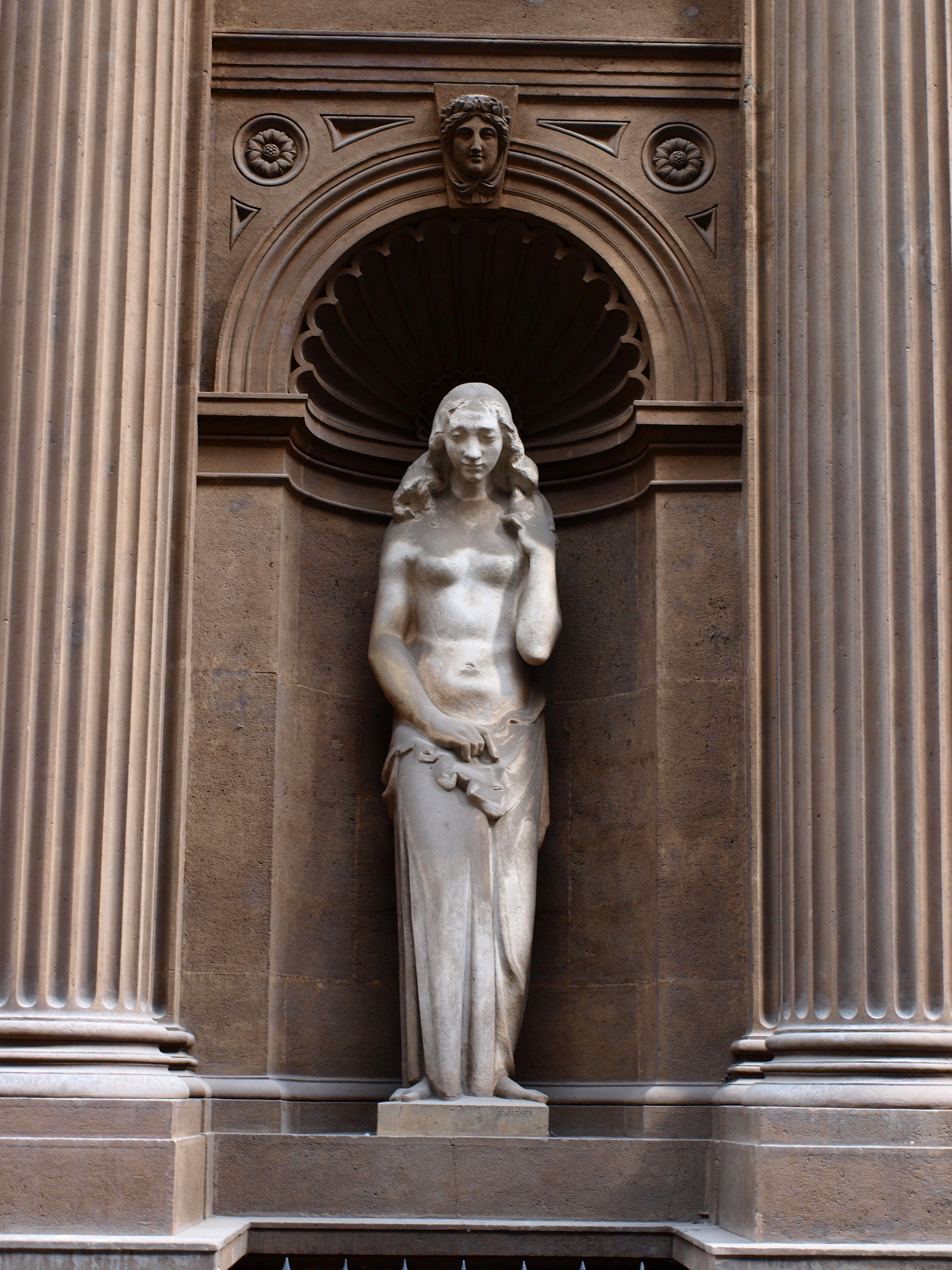
Sculpture

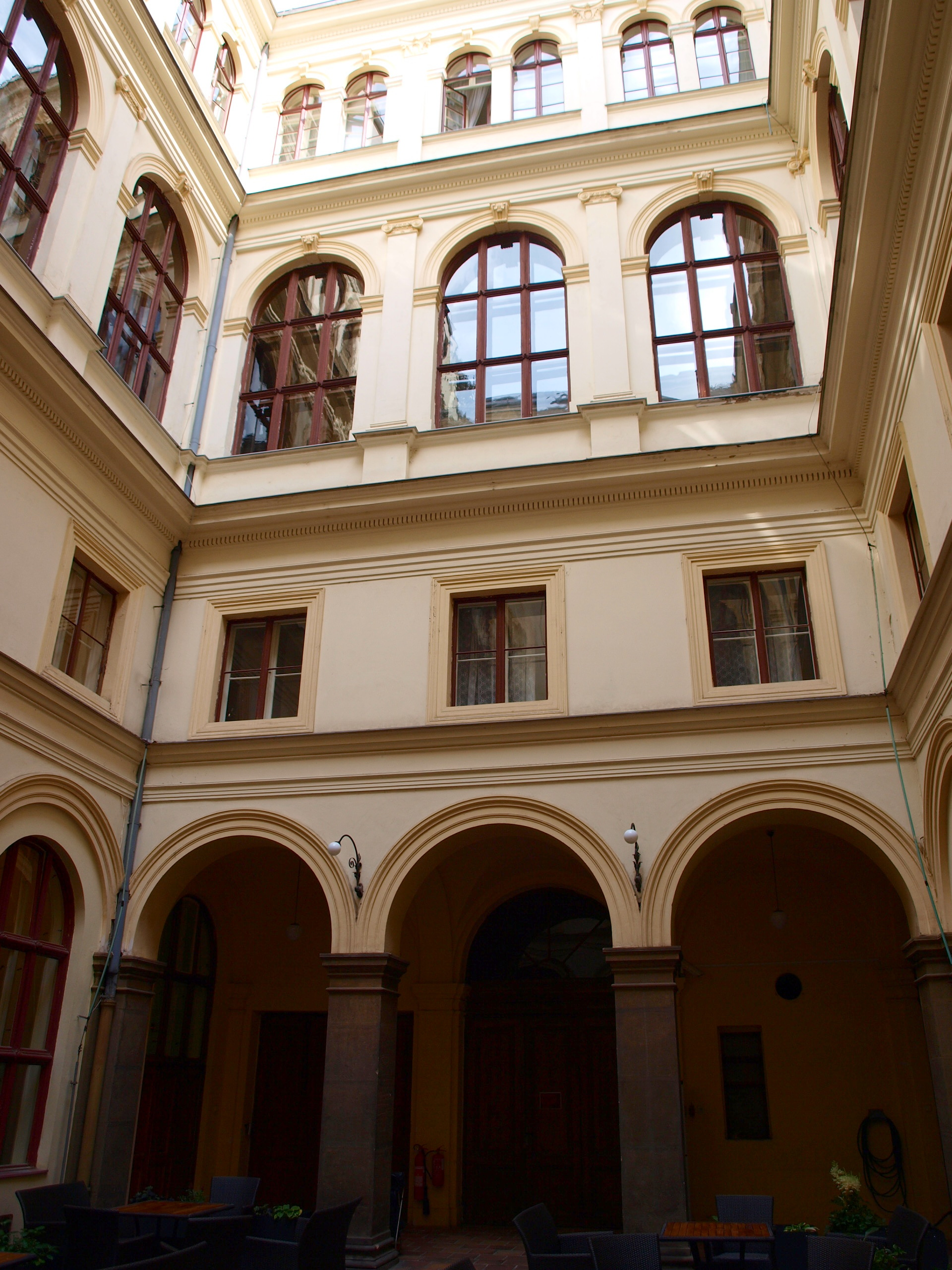
Courtyard

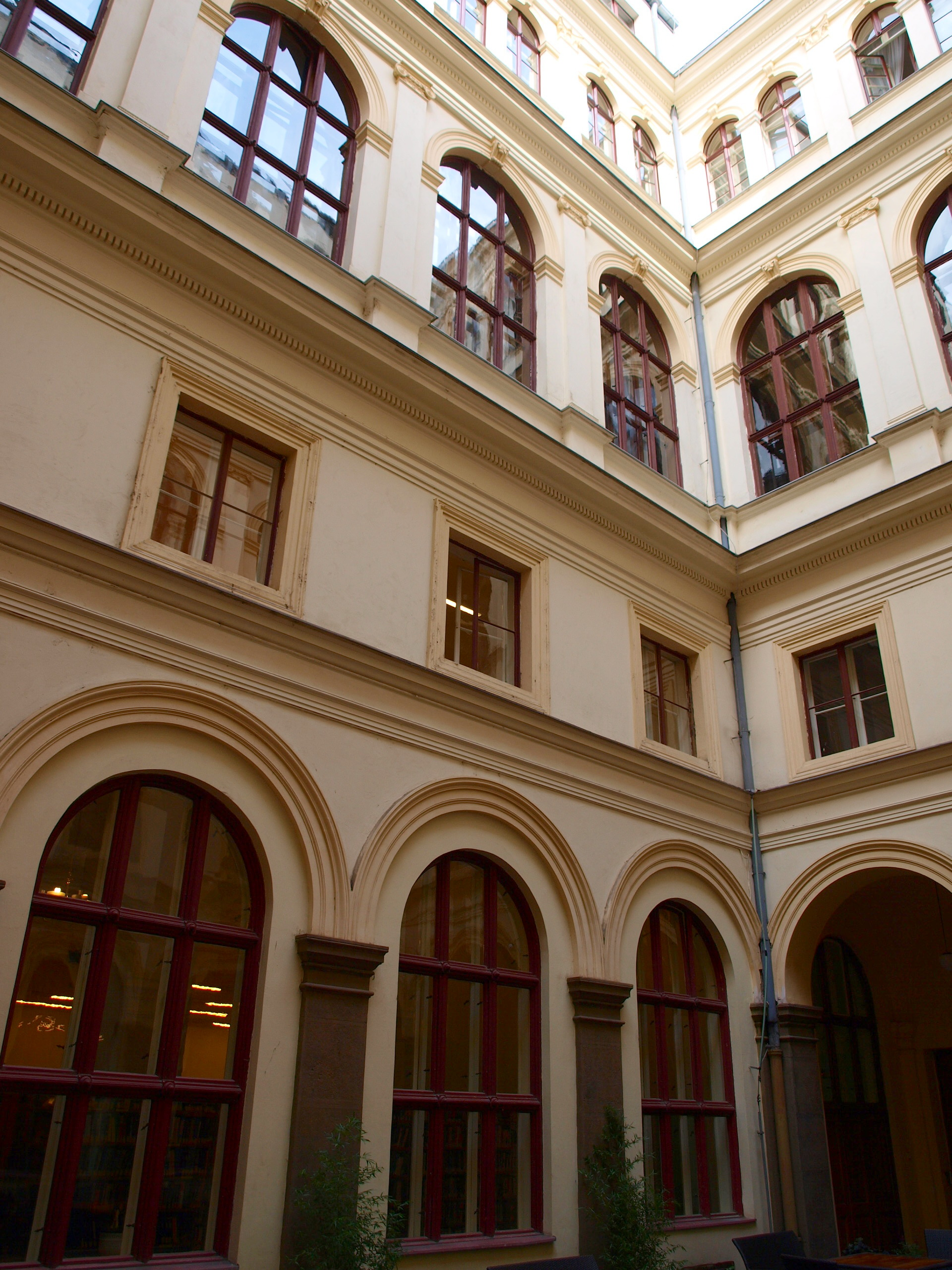
Courtyard

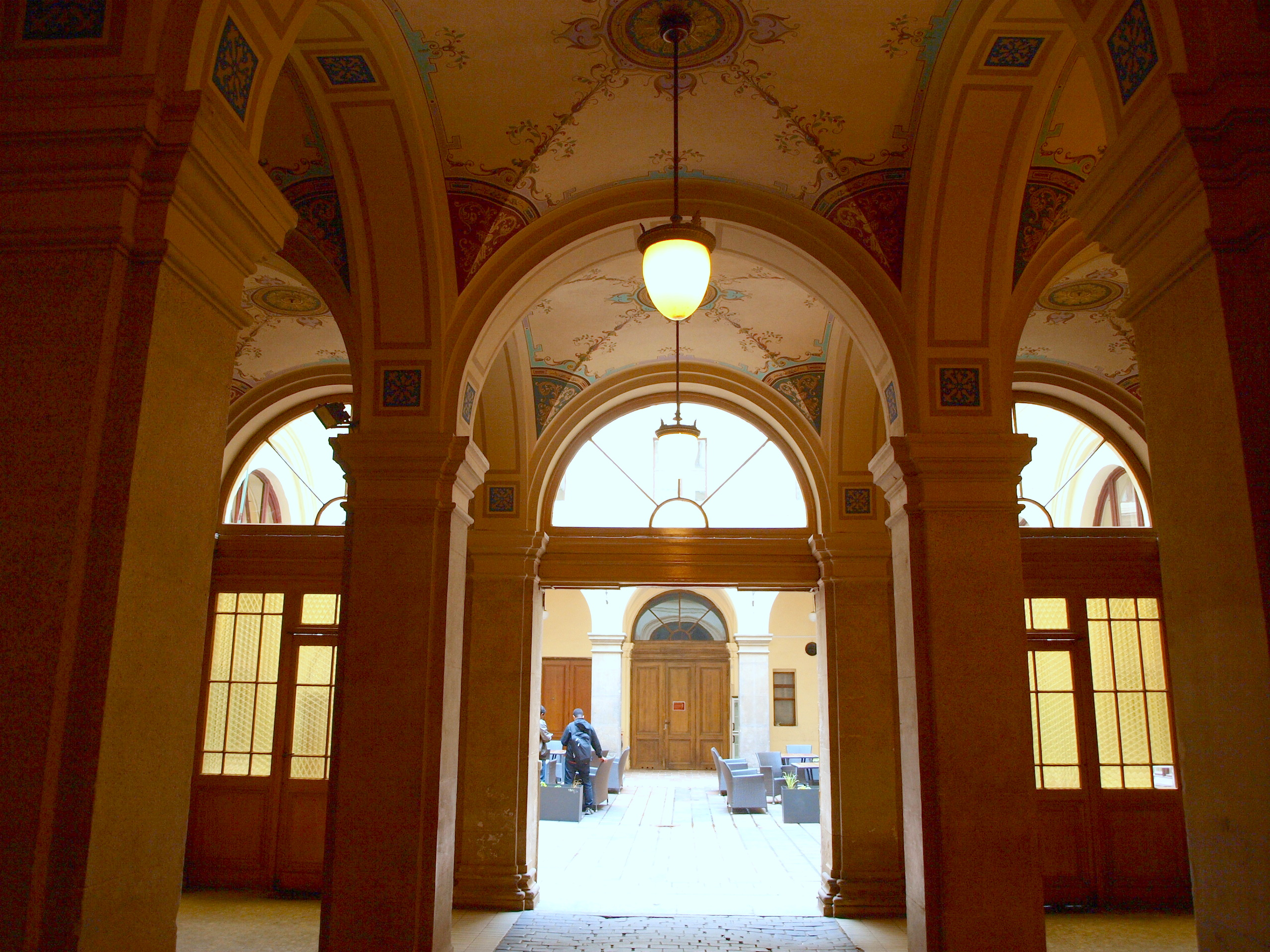
Vestibule

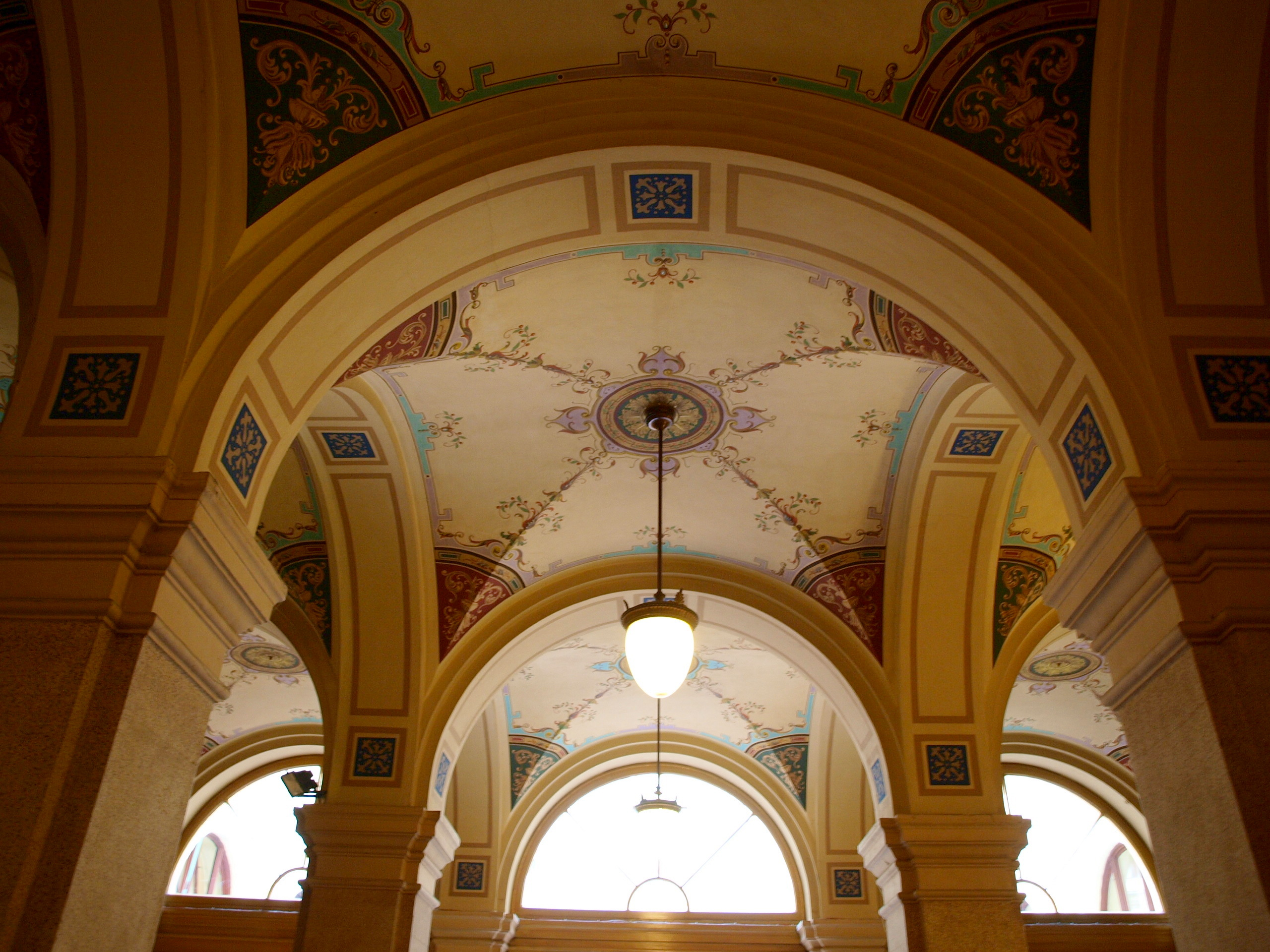
Vestibule

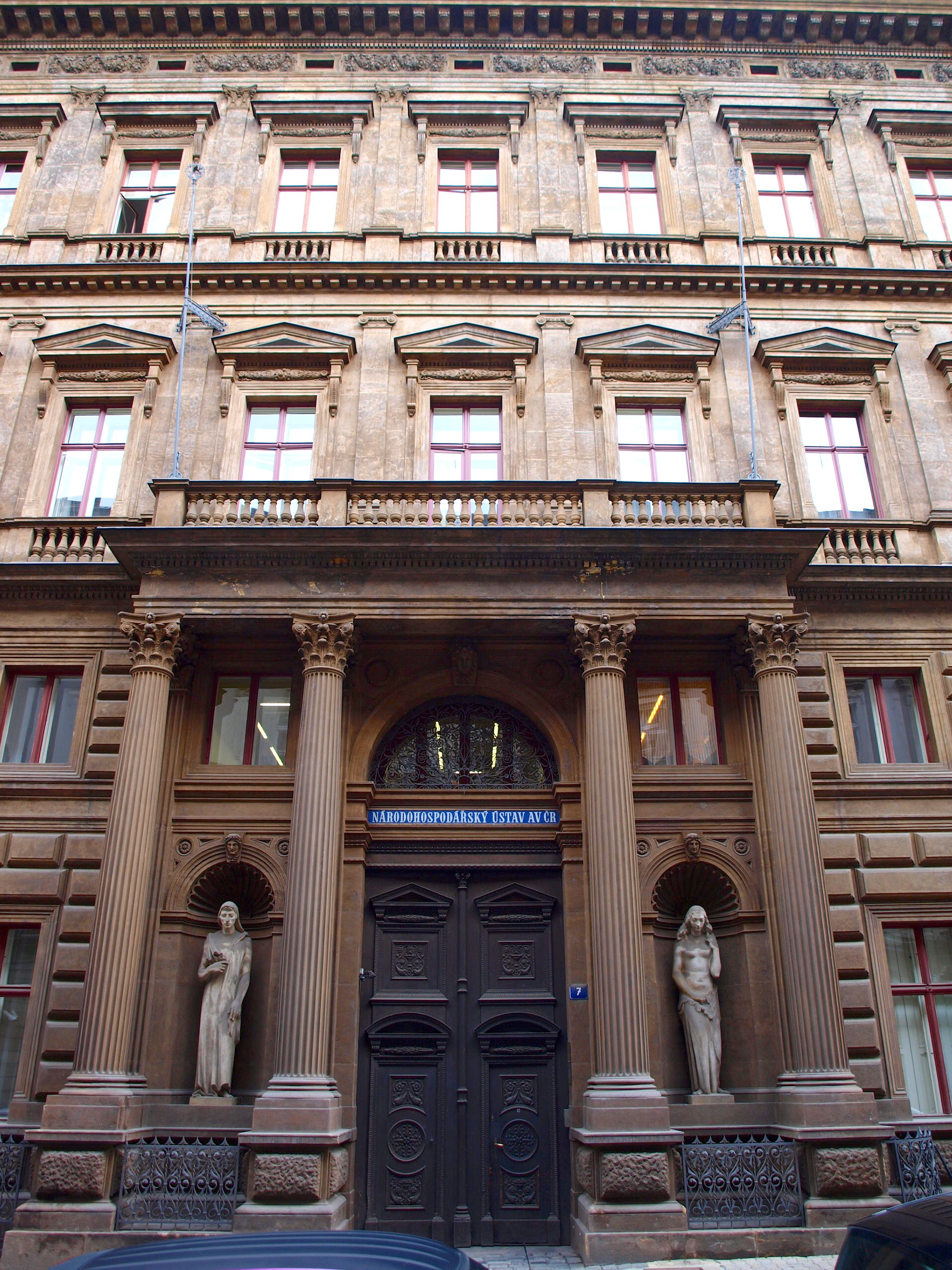
Entrance to the palace
