= Villa Lanna =

Neo-Renaissance building in Prague

- Lannova vila
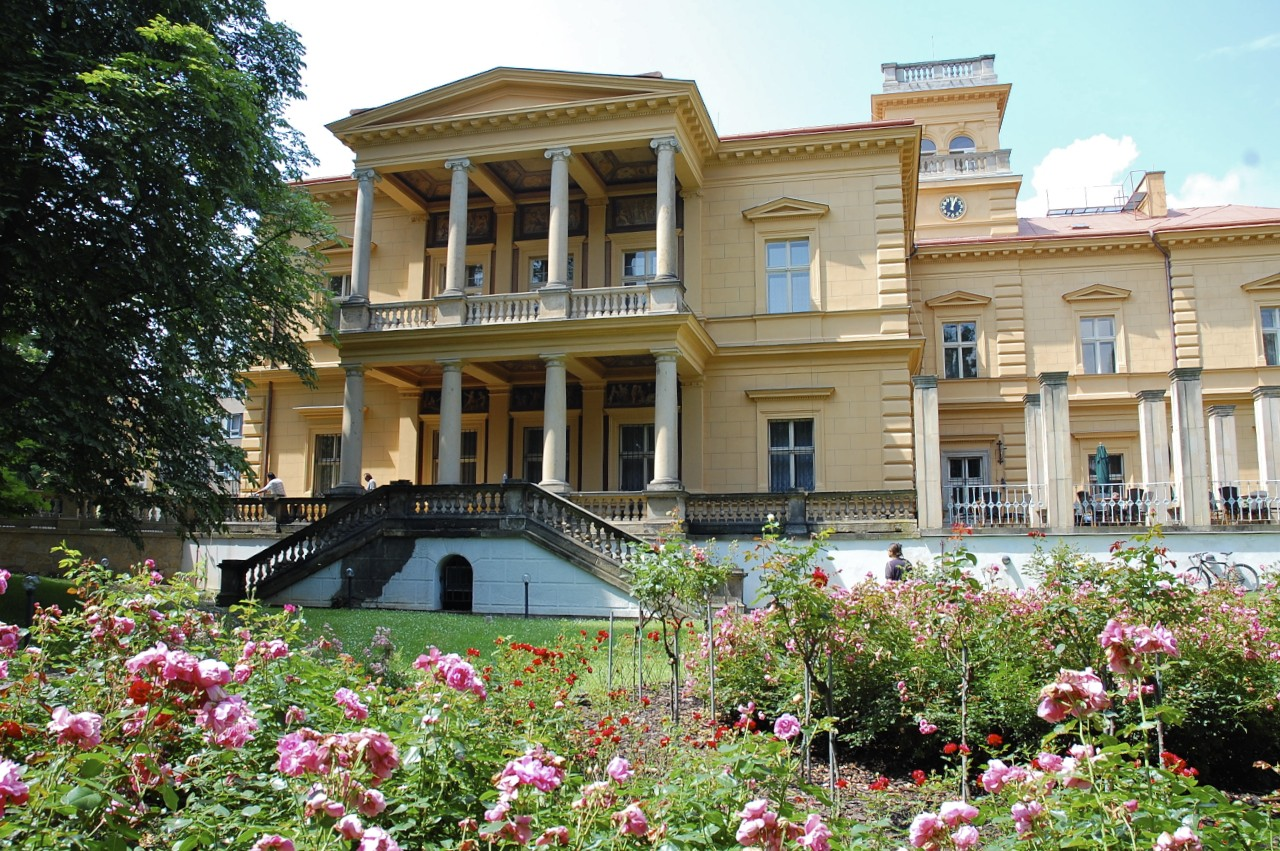
- Interactive map of the Villa Lanna area

General information
- Architectural style: Neo-Renaissance
- Location: Prague 6, Czech Republic
- Coordinates: 50°6′8.96″N 14°24′26.11″E
- Completed: 1872

Villa Lanna (Czech: Lannova vila) is a Neo-Renaissance landmark building located in a residential quarter of Bubeneč in Prague 6, Czech Republic. It is a property of the Academy of Sciences of the Czech Republic and is used for representative purposes such as scientific symposia, jubilee festivals and also as a hotel.

== Situation ==
The villa is situated in a large garden in the Bubeneč district of west part of Prague. Its grounds are along the former main road used to reach Stromovka Park.

== History ==
Villa Lanna was projected in 1868 and built until 1872 by Czech industrial entrepreneur and world-famous art collector Adalbert (Vojtěch) Lanna Junior (1836-1909) to be a summer residence for his family. It was designed probably by Vojtěch Ignác Ullmann in an early Neo-Renaissance style inspired by Italian Palladian models of villa suburbana, designed at the same period by Gottfried Semper in Dresden. It is one of the first examples of this style in Prague.

The villa is decorated with paintings by Heinrich Gärtner and friezes and drawings by Viktor Barvitius. Three main salons were named after the Greek and Roman gods depicted in the paintings: Salon of Apollon, Venus and Bacchus. A fourth salon is named after the home of the Lanna family‘s ancestors, Traunsee.

== Actual building arrangement ==
The ground floor is composed of a foyer with a reception desk and two social halls with rich murals. The smaller social hall, originally the billiard room, with the seating capacity of 18 is optimal for holding ceremonial lunches or dinners. The larger hall, with the option of an outdoor terrace, is suitable for holding seminars, conferences, banquets, weddings and family celebrations.

The first floor consists of a lounge with a terrace offering a view of the garden. A recently reconstructed tower with upper terrace gives a view not only of the surroundings of Villa Lanna, but also of the Prague Zoo or the Troya castle with its contiguous vineyards.

== Accommodation ==
Guests can choose from various options of accommodation. There are 7 rooms on the 1st floor of Villa Lanna; bathrooms are shared by two rooms. In the year of 2000, the accommodation capacity was extended by 17 rooms with the addition of two separate buildings on the grounds. These rooms have private bathrooms. A barrier-free room is also available. All rooms are equipped with a satellite TV, a refrigerator, a telephone and a wi-fi or cable connection.
