= Antonín Viktor Barvitius =

Czech architect

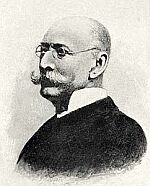
- Antonín Viktor Barvitius
- Born: July 14, 1823; Prague
- Died: July 20, 1901
- Occupation: Architect
- Buildings: Villa Lanna, Villa Grébovka

Antonín Viktor Barvitius (July 14, 1823 in Prague – July 20, 1901), also known as Anton Barvitius, was a Czech architect working in Revivalism architecture.

== Life ==
Barvitius originally studied philosophy and law, but then switched his studies to the Academy of Fine Arts in Prague in 1843. He later studied architecture at the Vienna Academy of Fine Arts. In 1854, he went on a scholarship to Rome where he worked on restoring renaissance monuments. His most significant work there was on the reconstruction of the Palazzo Venezia.

After returning to Prague, he worked on several building projects with his brother-in-law and fellow architect Vojtěch Ignác Ullmann. They worked together on the design of the Franz Josef train station in Prague (now called Praha hlavní nádraží), which was demolished in 1904 to make way for the current Art Nouveau building. They also worked together on the Villa Lanna.

Barvitius later worked for the Christian Academy and became its chairman. He was also chairman of the art department of the Association for the completion of St. Vitus' Cathedral, he was a monument conservator of the Central Commission in Vienna and a member of the Czech Academy of Sciences and Arts.

He was also active as an archaeologist, and in 1882 Pope Leo XIII awarded him the distinguished knightly order of St. Gregory for his expertise in Christian archeology.

Barvitius was the older of two brothers. His younger brother, Viktor Barvitius was a painter.

He is buried at Olšany Cemetery in Prague.

== Works ==
- 1855–1865 Reconstruction of the Palazzo Venezia in Rome
- 1871-1874 Villa Grébovka in Prague
- 1872 Villa Lanna in Prague, together with Vojtěch Ignác Ullmann
- 1881–1885 St. Wensceslas church in Prague Smíchov

== Writing ==
- Anton Barvitius: Bericht über den Bestand der Baulichkeiten des K. K. Botschaftshotel in Rom genannt il Palazzo di Venezia. Mit einer Geschichte des Palastes als Einleitung zum Berichte, Manuskript, Rom 1858 (Digitalisat)

== Literature ==
- "Barvitius Anton". In: Österreichisches Biographisches Lexikon 1815–1950 (ÖBL). Vol. 1, Austrian Academy of Sciences, Vienna 1957, p. 52.
- Jiri Pesek, Zdenel Hojda, Lubomir Rorizka: The Palaces of Prague. 1994.
