= Spanish Synagogue (Prague) =

Former synagogue in Prague, the Czech Republic

- Czech: Španělská synagoga German: Spanische Synagoge; Hebrew: בית הכנסת הספרדי
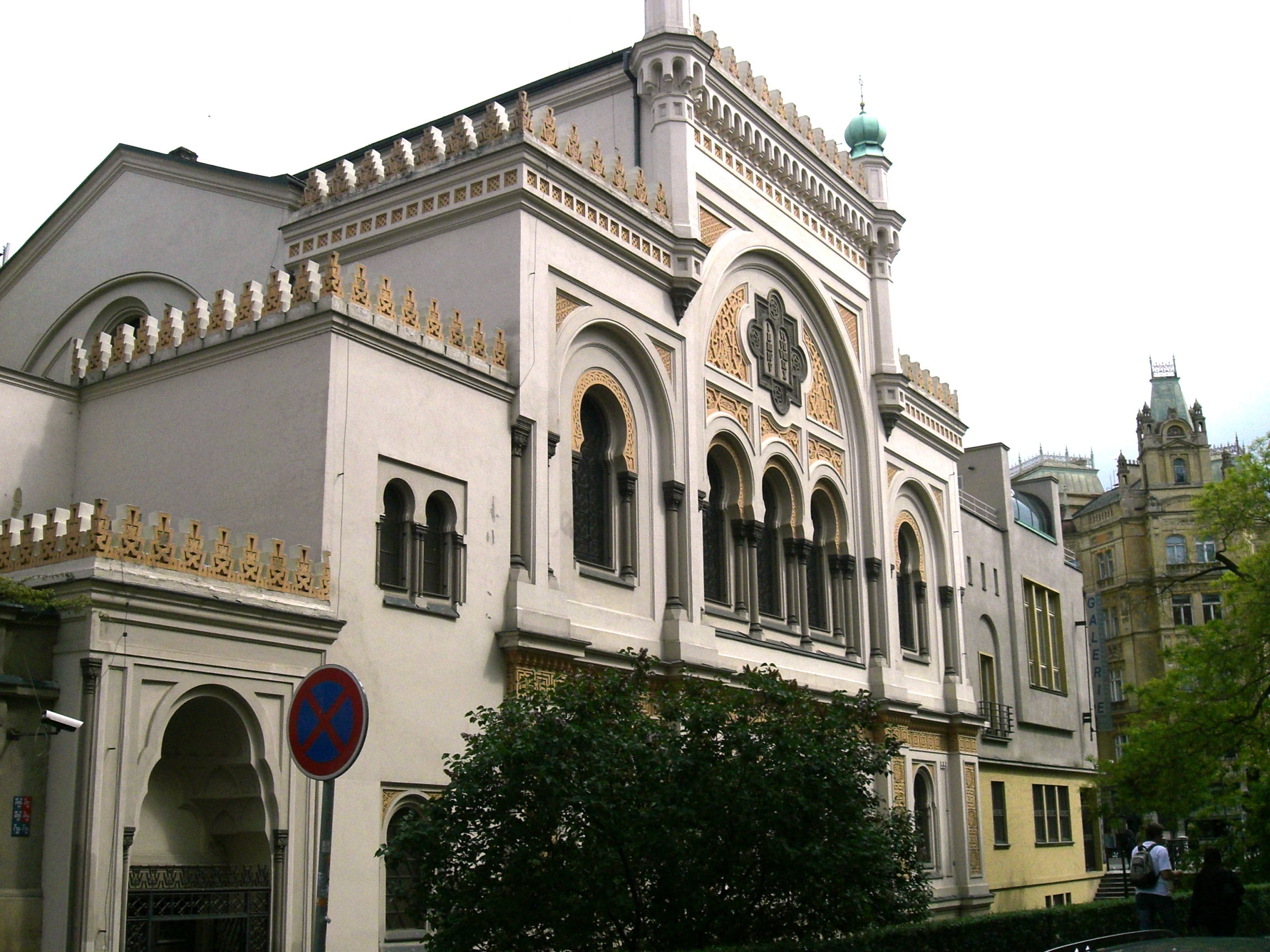
- The former synagogue, now museum, in 2007

- Location of the former synagogue, now museum, in the Czech Republic

Religion
- Affiliation: Conservative Judaism (former)
- Rite: Nusach Ashkenaz
- Ecclesiastical or organisational status: Synagogue (1868–1939); Jewish museum (since 1955)
- Status: Closed (as a synagogue); Repurposed

Location
- Location: Jewish Town, Prague
- Country: Czech Republic
- Coordinates: 50°05′25″N 14°25′15″E

Architecture
- Architects: Josef Niklas; Vojtěch Ignác Ullmann
- Type: Synagogue architecture
- Style: Moorish Revival
- Completed: 1868
- Dome: One

The Spanish Synagogue (Czech: Španělská synagoga, German: Spanische Synagoge, Hebrew: בית הכנסת הספרדי) is a former Reform Jewish synagogue, located in the area of the so-called Jewish Town, Prague, in the Czech Republic. The synagogue was completed in 1868 in the Moorish Revival style on the site of the presumably oldest synagogue, Old School (German: Altschul). In 1955 the former synagogue was permanently repurposed as a Jewish museum and is administered by the Jewish Museum in Prague.

A small park with a modern statue of Franz Kafka by Jaroslav Róna is situated between the synagogue and the Church of the Holy Spirit.

== History ==
The Spanish Synagogue is not the first synagogue at the site. Before it there stood probably the oldest synagogue in Prague Jewish Town, Altschul (Alte Schule, Old School, Old Synagogue). It was designed by architects Vojtěch Ignác Ullmann and Josef Niklas. Antonim Baum and Bedrich Munzberger added the unique Moorish-style decor between 1882 and 1883.

In the second half of 19th century, the capacity of the Altschul did not suffice. The modernist faction in the community, which renovated it in 1837 for the purpose of moderately reformed services, therefore decided to demolish the synagogue in 1867 and one year later it was replaced by the new, Spanish Synagogue. Its name presumably refers to the style in which it was built, Moorish Revival style, which was inspired by the art of Arabic period of Spanish history (this name was not always prevalent, in the beginnings it was usually called by German-speaking Jews Geistgasse-Tempel, i.e. Temple in Holy Spirit Street). The architectural plans were designed by Vojtěch Ignác Ullmann and Josef Niklas (an imposing interior decoration).

In 1935, a functionalistic building, designed by Karel Pecánek, was added to the synagogue. Until Second World War it served the Jewish Community as a hospital. The synagogue used the space of the new building as well; there was a vestibule and a winter oratory in it. Since 1935, the appearance of the synagogue has remained essentially unchanged.

During the Second World War, confiscated properties of Czech Jewish Communities were stored in the synagogue, e.g. the furniture from other synagogues. Ten years after the war, the synagogue was handed over to the Jewish Museum and in 1958–1959 it was completely restored inside. In the following year an exposition of synagogue textiles was opened there. In the 1970s the building became neglected and it was closed after 1982. The restoration started only after the Velvet revolution. Completely restored to its former beauty, the synagogue was re-opened with a ceremony in 1998.

== Design ==
The synagogue is two storeys high with a square ground plan. The main hall with a dome is surrounded by three built-in balconies. At the south balcony there is an organ. In the eastern wall there is a great round stained glass window with a central ornament of Magen David (hexagram), installed in 1882–1883. Underneath it there is a monumental aron ha-kodesh (Torah ark). The most impressive decorative element in the synagogue is a gilded and multi-colored parquet arabesque. Its designers, Antonín Baum and Bedřich Münzberger, were inspired by Arabic architecture and art. The synagogue was decorated according to their design in 1882–1893.

The disposition of the synagogue is reform – the reading platform, bimah, is situated at the eastern wall, not in the central space as in older synagogues. Benches (not original, but from synagogue in Zruč nad Sázavou) stand in rows (as in a church), not around the walls. The Torah ark is designed in the style of mihrab, and has no curtain (parochet) today.

== In the 21st century ==
Since the last restoration in 1998, an exhibition about the modern history of Jews in the Czech Republic can be seen there. It begins with reforms initiated by enlightened Habsburg Emperor Joseph II, which started the "Jewish emancipation" and the social inclusion of Jews into the larger society. Many personalities, who have contributed to its economy, science and culture, are mentioned here. Traumatic events of the 20th century are also commemorated. The themes of modern times accords well with the relationship between the synagogue and the Reform Jewish Community. The European Cantors Association held the concert for their 11th Annual Convention in the Spanish Synagogue in front of a packed crowd on 19 November 2016. Arranged as a tribute to ECA Convenor, Alex Klein, the concert was led by the Tel Aviv Cantorial Institute Choir conducted by Orthodox Jewish Cantor Naftali Herstik.

== Gallery ==
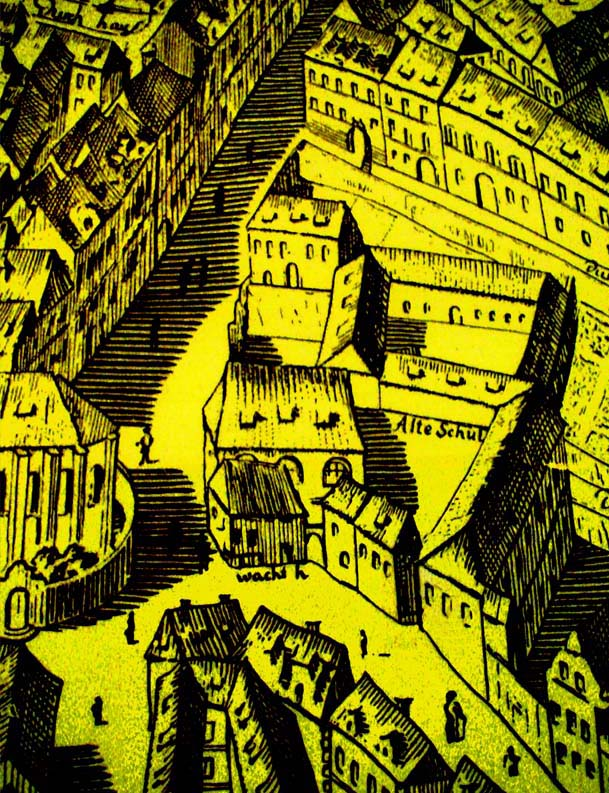
Altschul on the plan of Prague, 1769

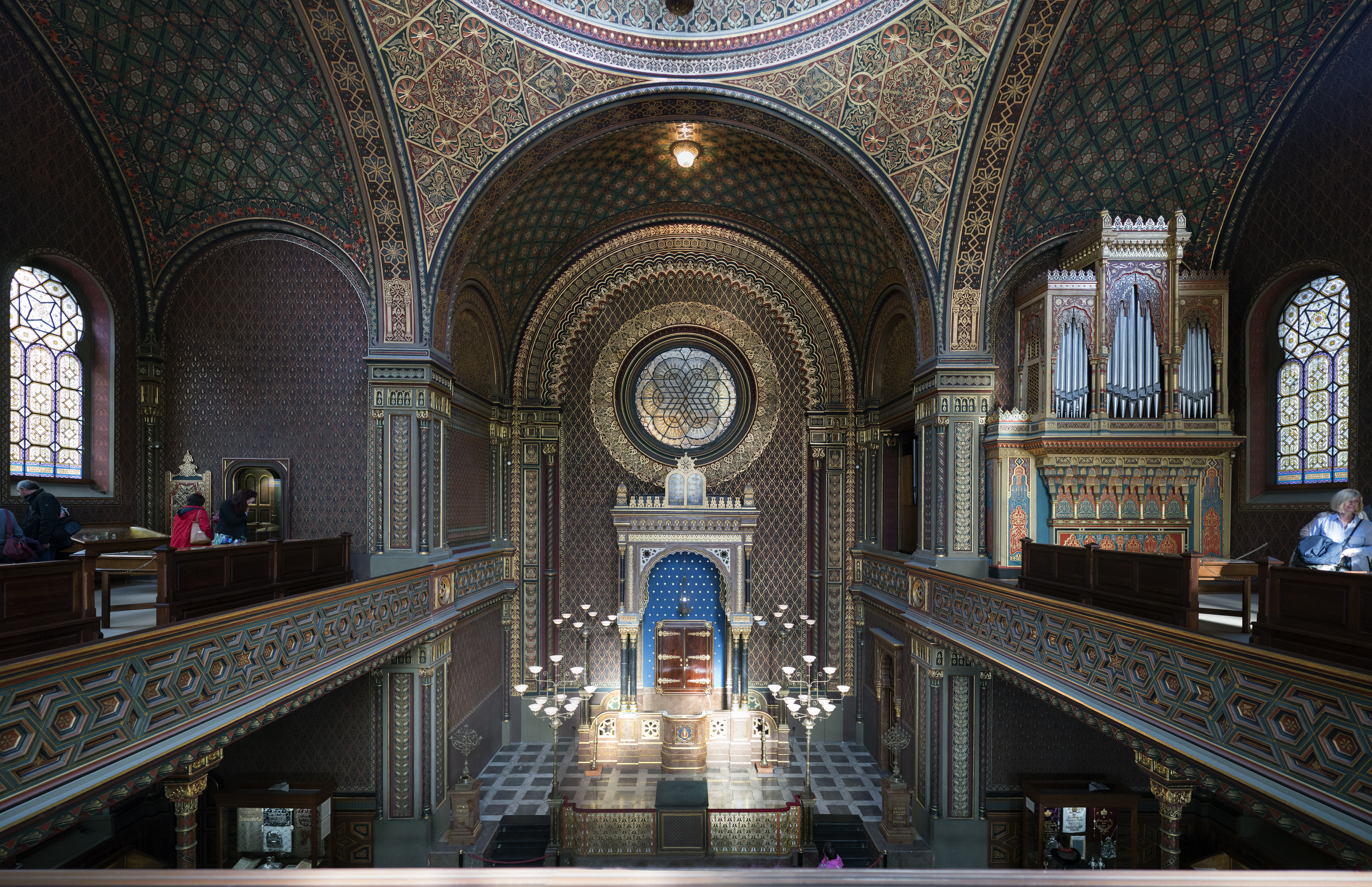
Interior of the synagogue

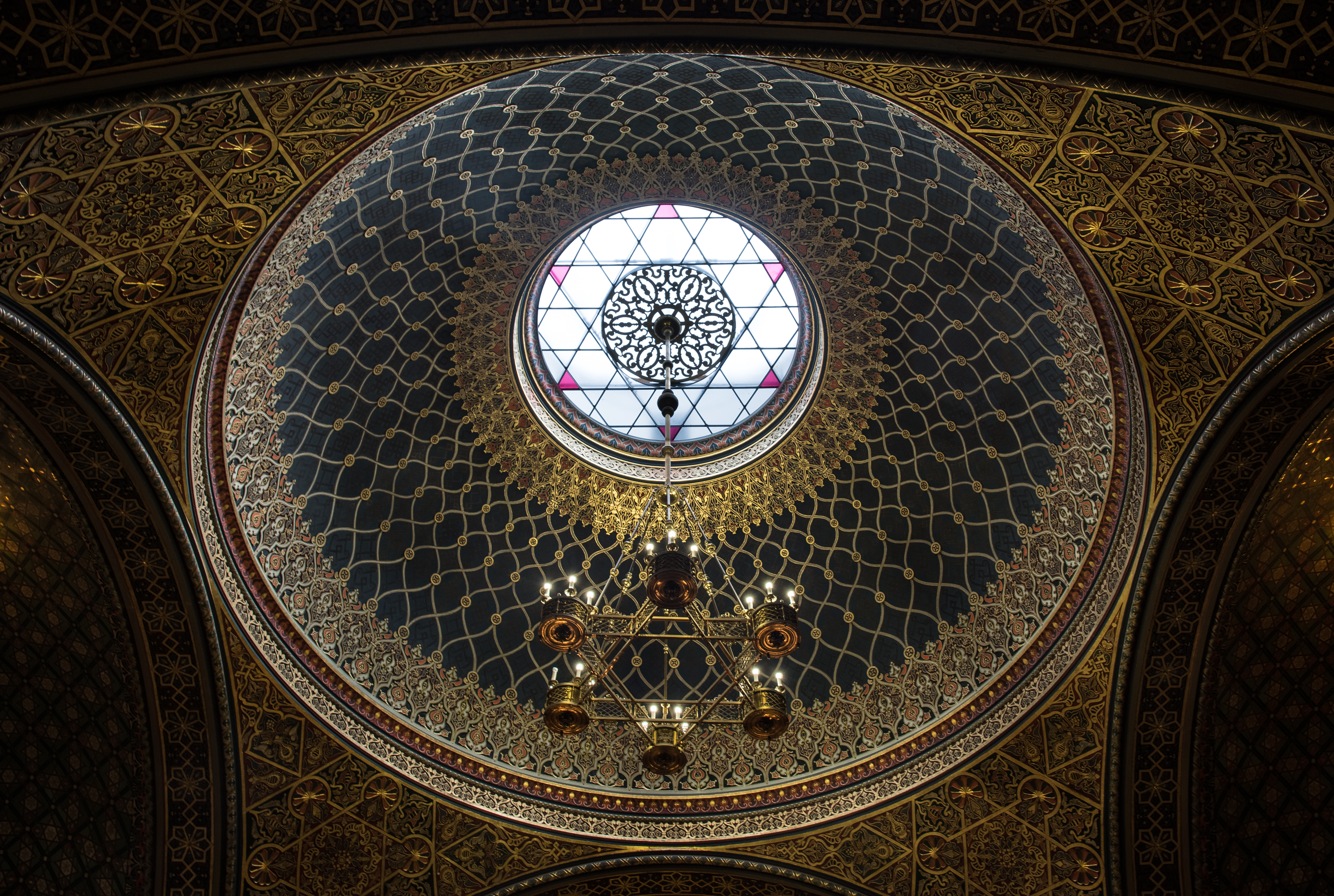
Dome above the main hall

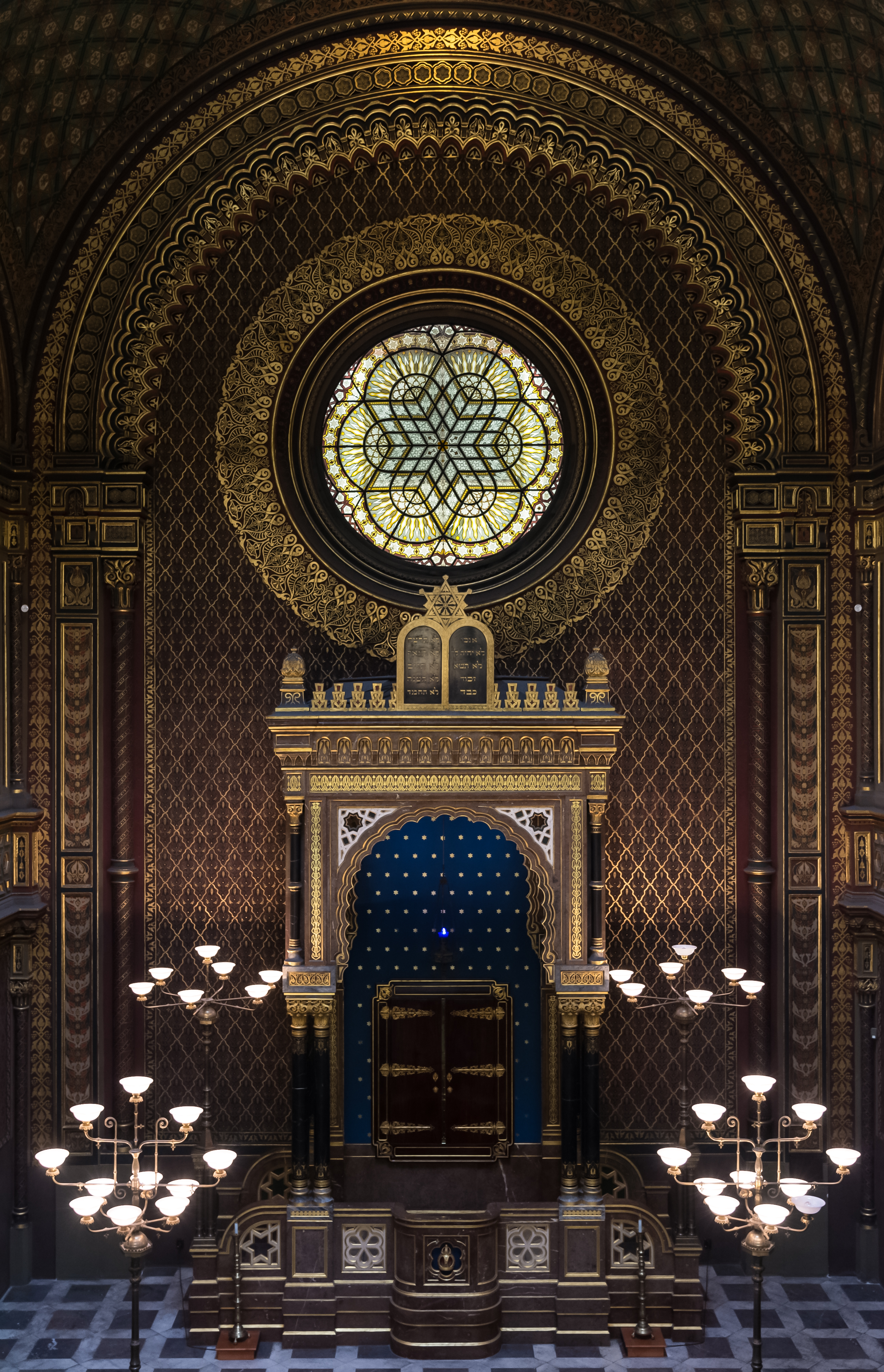
Torah ark and bimah

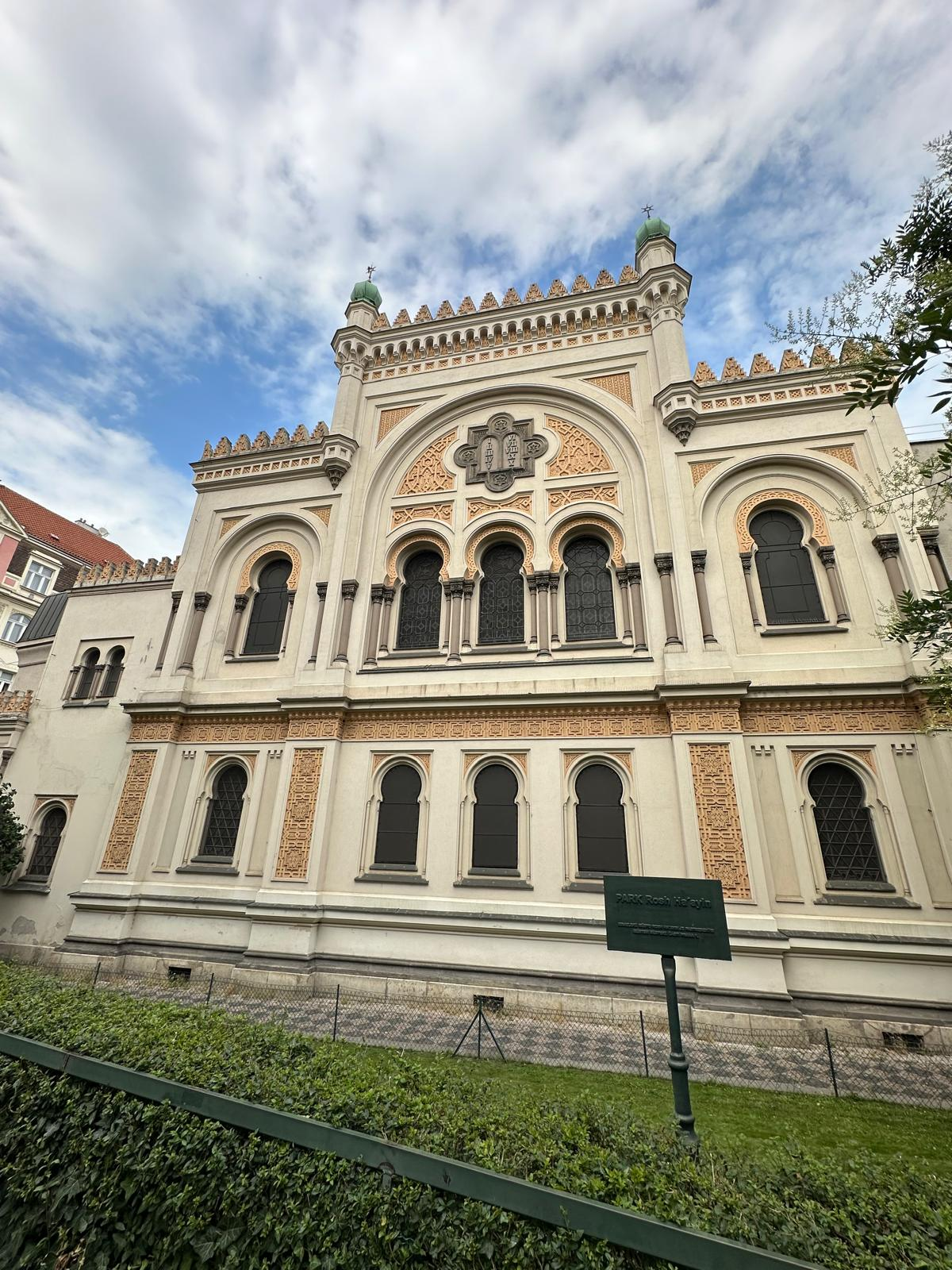
Spanish Synagogue (Prague)

== See also ==
- History of the Jews in the Czech Republic
- Spanish Synagogue, Venice
