= Church of Saints Cyril and Methodius (Karlín) =

- Kostel svatého Cyrila a Metoděje
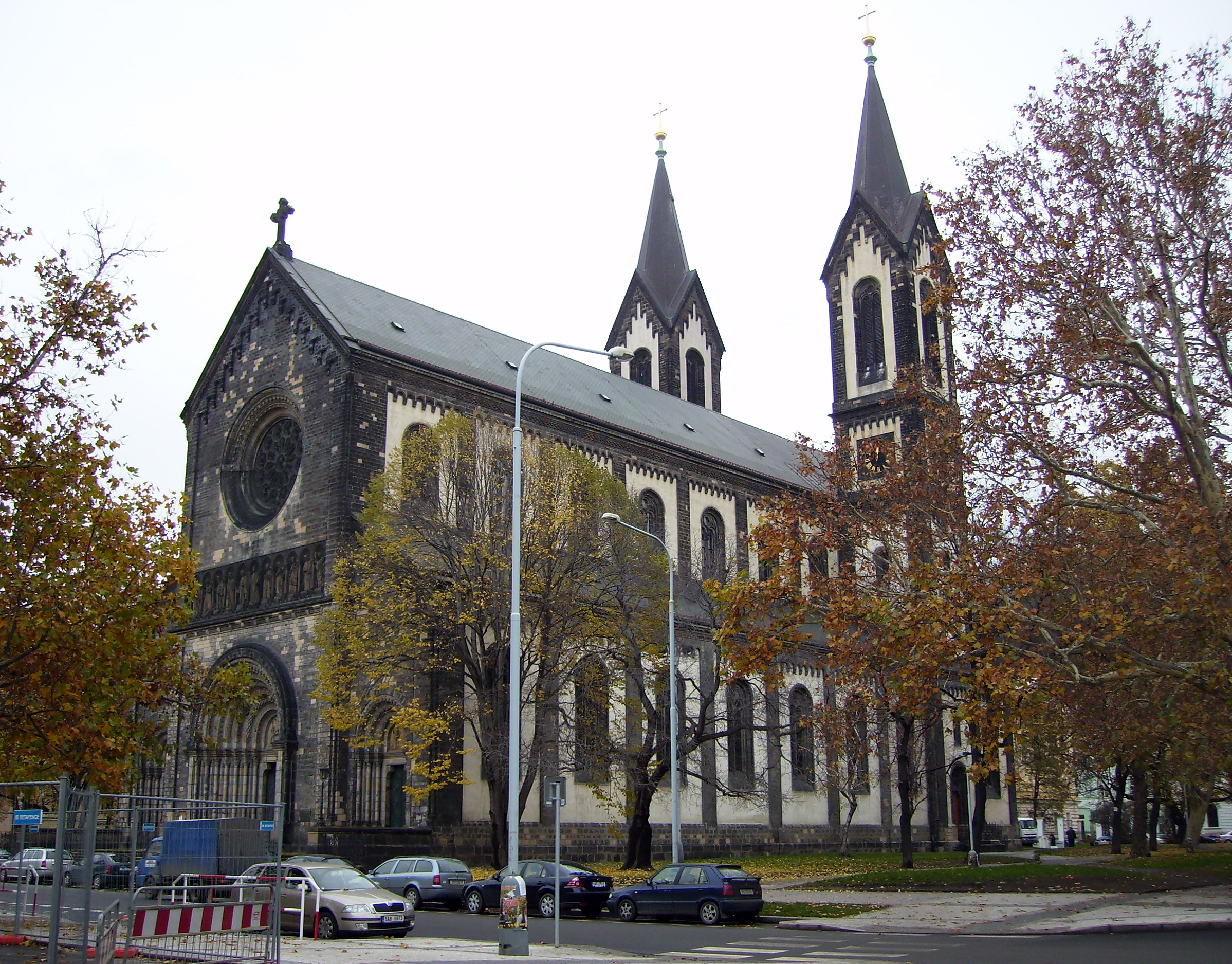
- Church of Saints Cyril and Methodius

Religion
- Affiliation: Roman Catholic
- Diocese: Archdiocese of Prague
- Ecclesiastical or organizational status: Active
- Year consecrated: 1863

Location
- Location: Karlín, Prague, Czech Republic
- Interactive map of Church of Saints Cyril and Methodius
- Coordinates: 50°5′29.203″N 14°26′52.827″E

Architecture
- Architects: Carl Roesner, Vojtěch Ignác Ullmann
- Type: Church
- Style: Neo-Romanesque
- Completed: 1863

Specifications
- Length: 75 m
- Width: 31 m
- Height (max): 27.5 m (90 ft)
- Materials: Bricks

Church of Saints Cyril and Methodius (Czech: Kostel svatého Cyrila a Metoděje) is a Roman Catholic church in the Karlín district of Prague, Czech Republic. It belongs to the largest religious buildings in the Czech Republic. It was constructed in the mid-19th century and it remains one of the most important architectural landmarks from the period of historicism in the country.

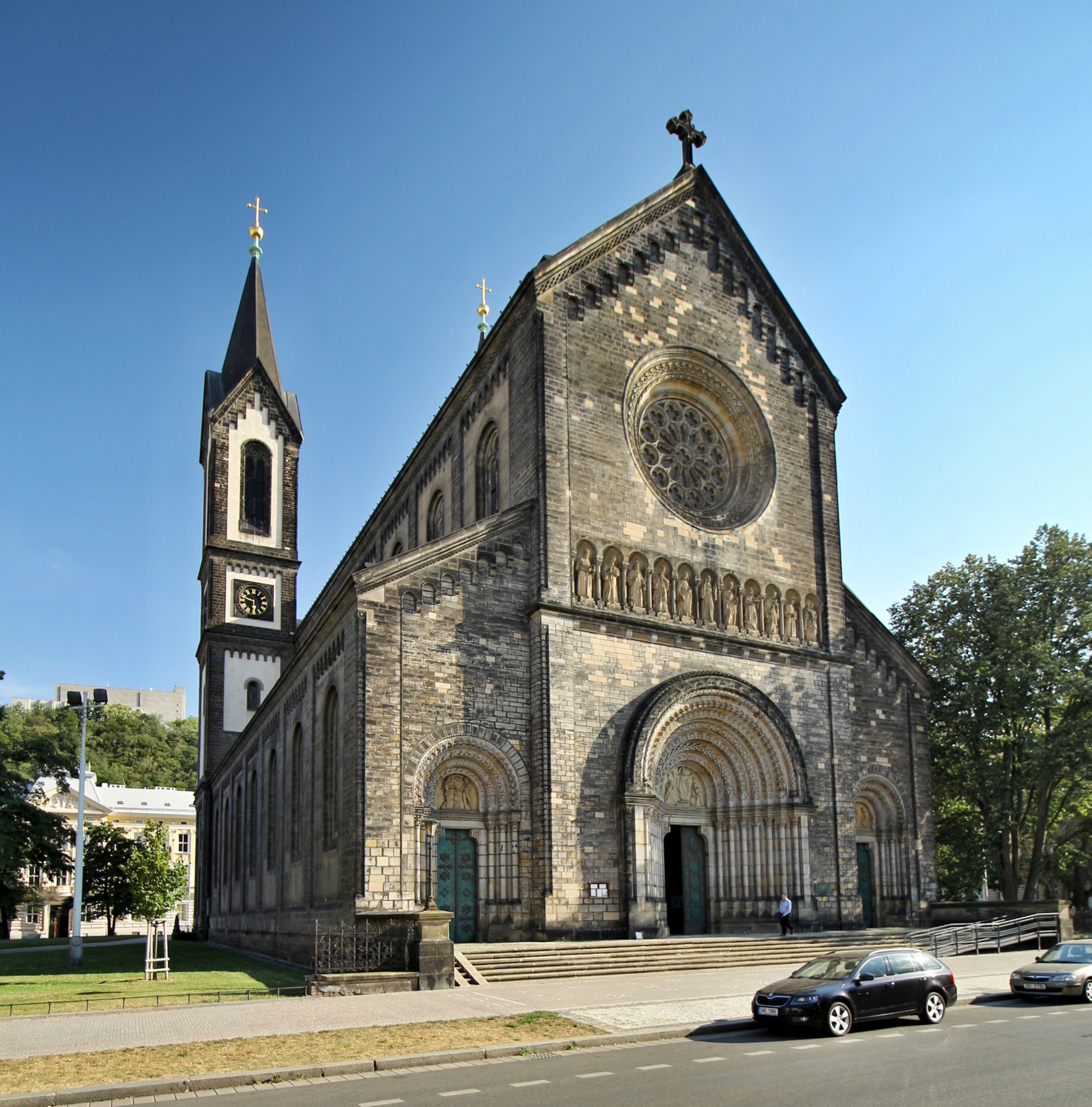
west facade

The church was built in 1854–1863 to plans by architects Carl Roesner and Vojtěch Ignác Ullmann. Several Czech and Austrian artists contributed to the decoration of the church, led by František Sequens and Josef Matyáš Trenkwald. The Church was consecrated on 18 October 1863, on the millennium anniversary of the arrival of Saints Cyril and Methodius to the Bohemian lands.

The church has been constructed in the late Neo-Romanesque style as a basilica with highly elevated main nave and two towers. The ground plan contents an entrance hall, three naves and a presbytery with a semicircular apse between two chapels under the towers. The last decoration of baptismal chapel was finished in 1905 in an art nouveau style.

== General references ==
- Kulhánek, Ludvík (1906). Chrám sv. Cyrila a Methoděje v Karlíně. Praha: Storch. Archived from the original on 2011-08-19.
- Karlín. Chrám sv. Cyrila a Metoděje v Praze-Karlíně. Photos by Martin Frouz. Kostelní Vydří: Karmelitánské nakladatelství, 2007. 216 s. ISBN 978-80-7195-172-8. (the book was awarded the prize for the best Czech book illustrations of the year).
- Official website of Prague 8 (in Czech)
