= Viktor Barvitius =

Czech painter (1834–1902)

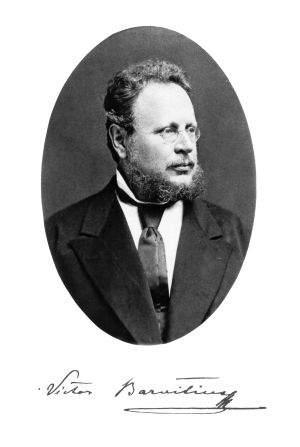
- Born: 28 March 1834; Prague
- Died: 9 June 1902; Prague
- Known for: Painter

Viktor Barvitius (28 March 1834 – 9 June 1902) was a Czech painter, influenced primarily by Realism and late Impressionism.

== Life and work ==
Viktor Barvitius was the youngest child of Andreas Barvitius (1782–1836) and his wife Barbara, née Egger (1805–1874). His older brother was the architect Antonín Viktor Barvitius (1823–1901). His sister Therezia (1826–1894) was married to the architect Vojtěch Ignác Ullmann.

In 1864 he graduated from the Prague Academy. His graduate work was a picture of the Battle of Crecy. From 1865 to 1868 lived in Paris, where he studied under Thomas Couture. In 1860 he returned to Bohemia, then devoted himself to genre painting. He died in Prague, aged 68.

Notable works include a portrait of Adolf Kosárek (1853), Čtvrtek ve Stromovce (Thursday in Stromovka) (1860), Slavnost ve Hvězdě (Festival of the Stars), Place de la Concorde (1866) and another version of Čtvrtek ve Stromovce (1885).

== Gallery ==
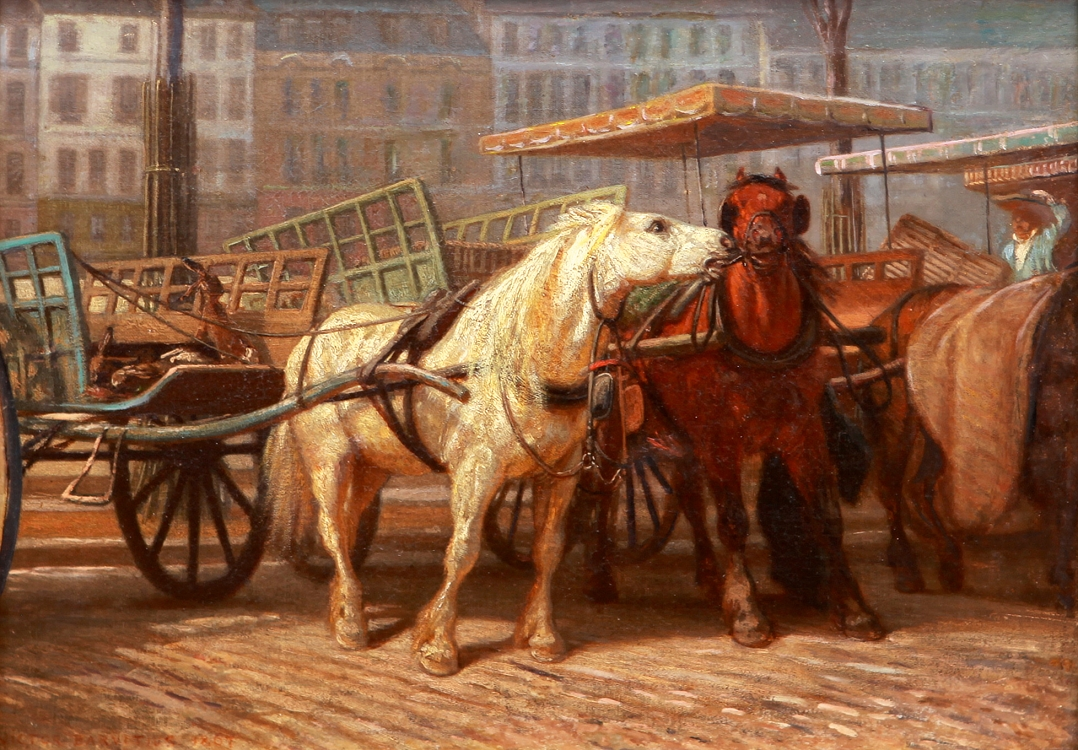
Carts on the Waterfront

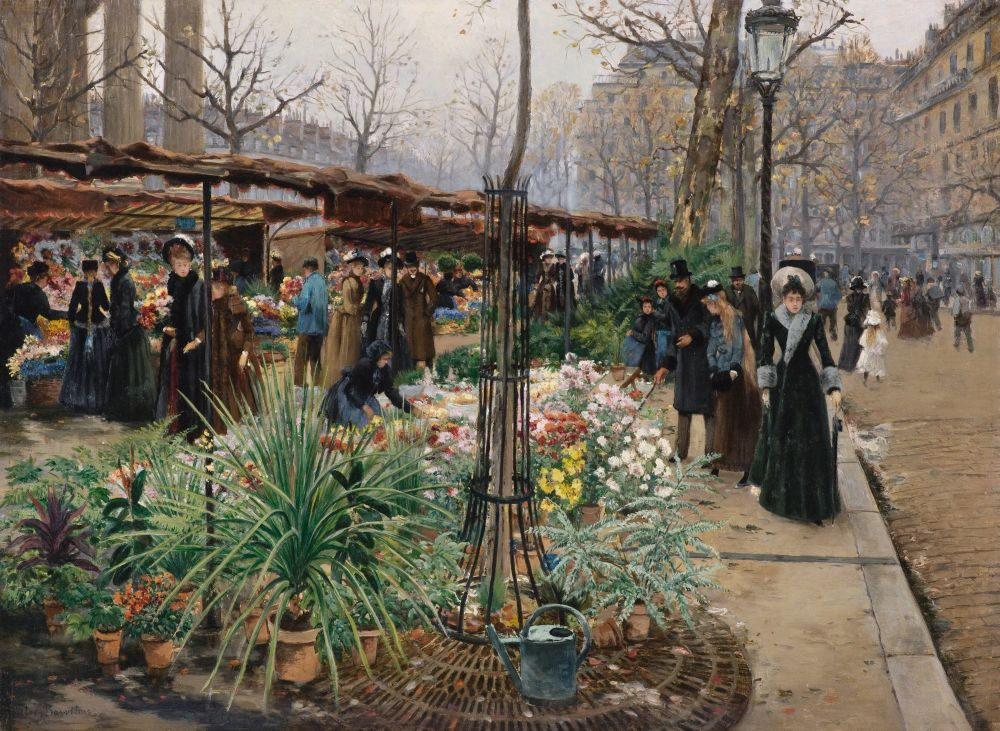
At the Flower Market

The Battle of Crecy

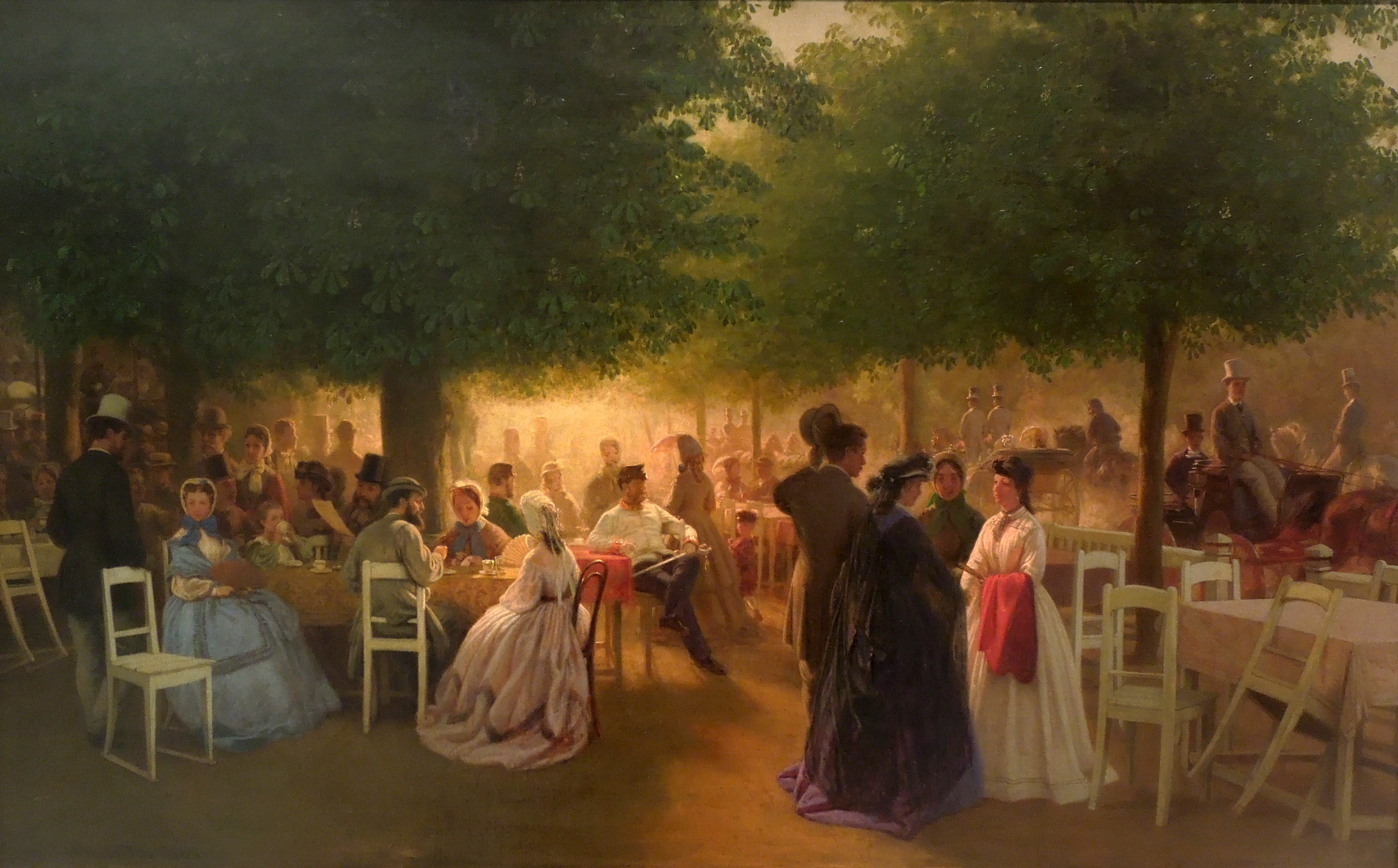
Thursday at Stromovka
