= Vojtěch Ignác Ullmann =

Czech architect (1822–1897)

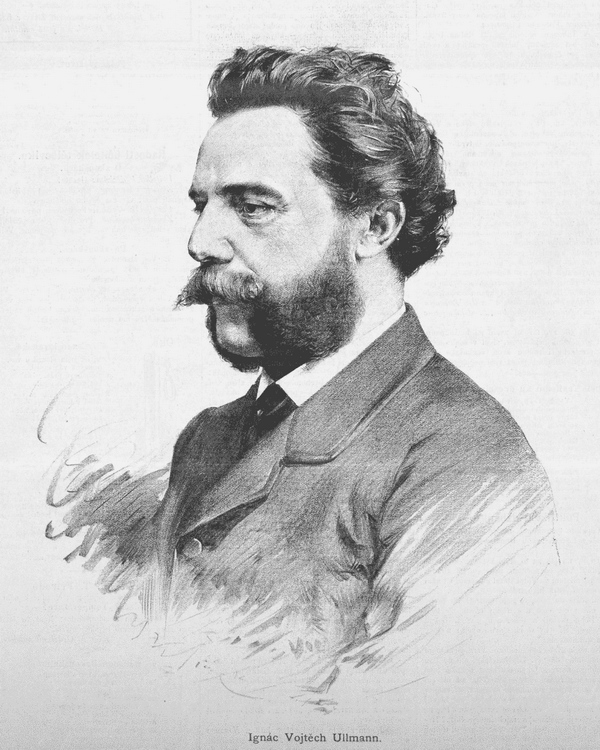
- drawing by Jan Vilímek, 1887
- Born: 23 April 1822; Prague
- Died: 17 September 1897 (aged 75); Příbram
- Occupation: Architect
- Buildings: Church of Saints Cyril and Methodius, Schebek Palace, Spanish Synagogue

Vojtěch Ignác Ullmann (23 April 1822 in Prague – 17 September 1897 in Příbram) was a Czech architect working in Revivalism architecture, particularly Renaissance Revival architecture.

== Life ==
Ullmann studied architecture at the Academy of Fine Arts in Vienna with professors August Sicard von Sicardsburg and Eduard van der Nüll. After finishing his studies, he travelled to Italy. From 1854 he worked as an architect in Prague.

He often collaborated with the architect Antonín Viktor Barvitius, whose sister he married in 1856. By 1874 he had designed a number of buildings in Prague.

== Design style ==
In Ullmann's early work we see echoes of medieval stylistic elements (see the Church of Saints Cyril and Methodius in Prague 8 - Karlín). In the next phase of his work, he was significantly influenced by the Viennese renaissance school.

== Work ==
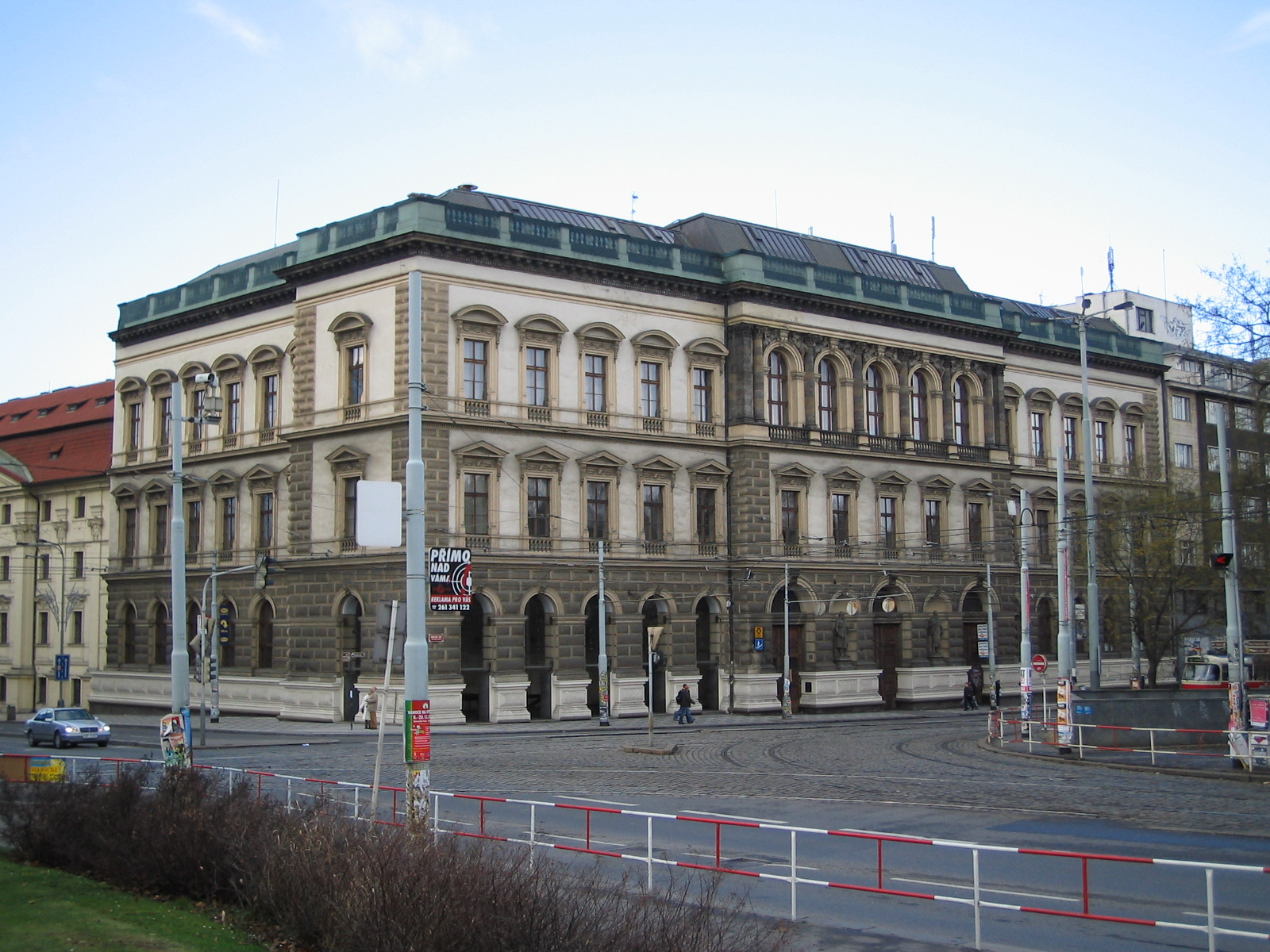
Polytechnic building at Karlovo Square

=== Prague ===
- Church of Saints Cyril and Methodius (Karlín), Karlínské Square. Prague 8
- Czech Polytechnic, Karlovo Square 13, Prague 1, (today a part of the Czech Technical University in Prague)
- Czech Savings Bank, today the headquarters of the Czech Academy of Sciences, Narodni 3, Prague 1
- Villa Lanna, Pelléova 24, Praha 6, now owned by the Czech Academy of Sciences
- Lažanský palace, Smetanově nábřeží 2, Prague 1, home of Café Slavia
- Letna chateau, Letenské sady 341, Prague 7
- Schebek Palace, Politických vězňů 7, Prague 1, home to CERGE-EI
- Sokol house of Sokol Pražský, Sokolská 43, Prague 2
- Spanish Synagogue, Vězeňská 1, Prague 1
- Vodičkova Girls' high school, Vodičkova 22, Prague 1, now an elementary school (ZŠ Vodičkova)

=== Outside of Prague ===
- Town hall in Příbram

== Gallery ==
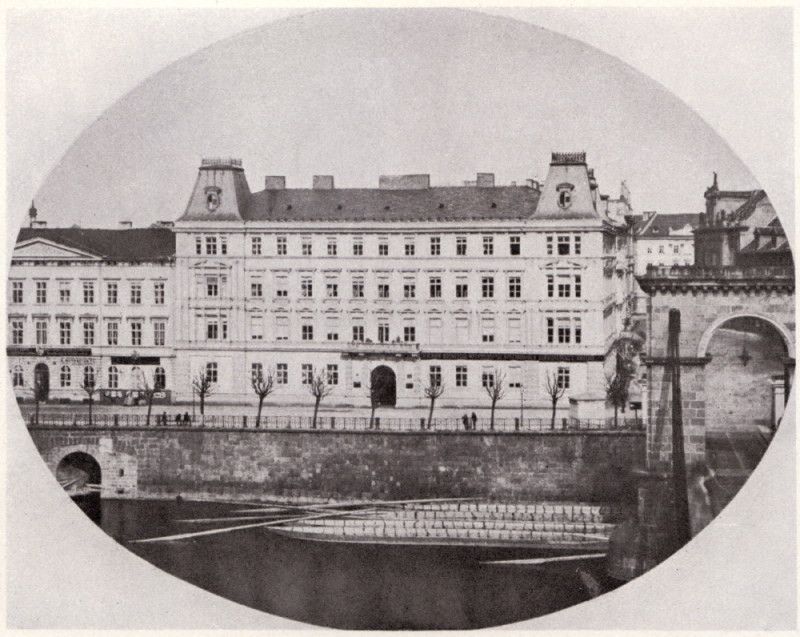
Lažanský palace, photo by Wilhelm Rupp, c. 1865

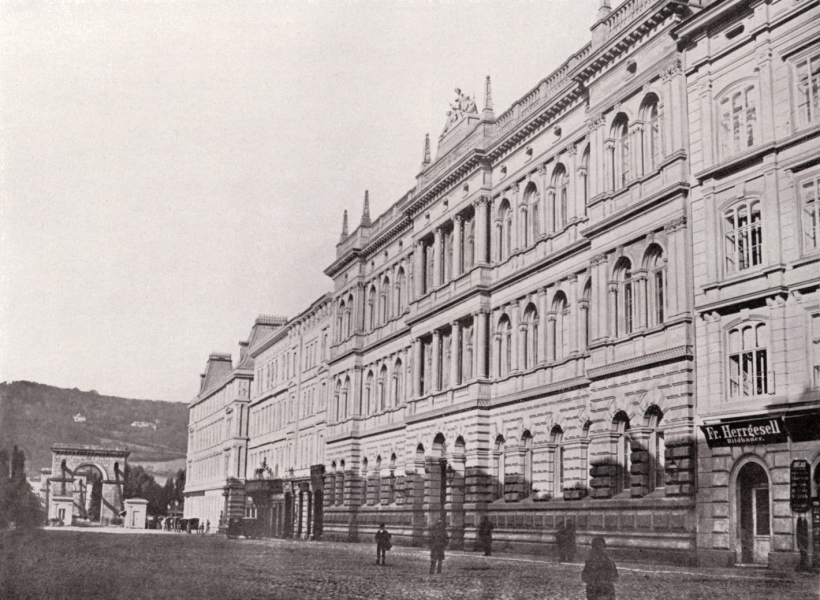
Lažanský palace, 1865

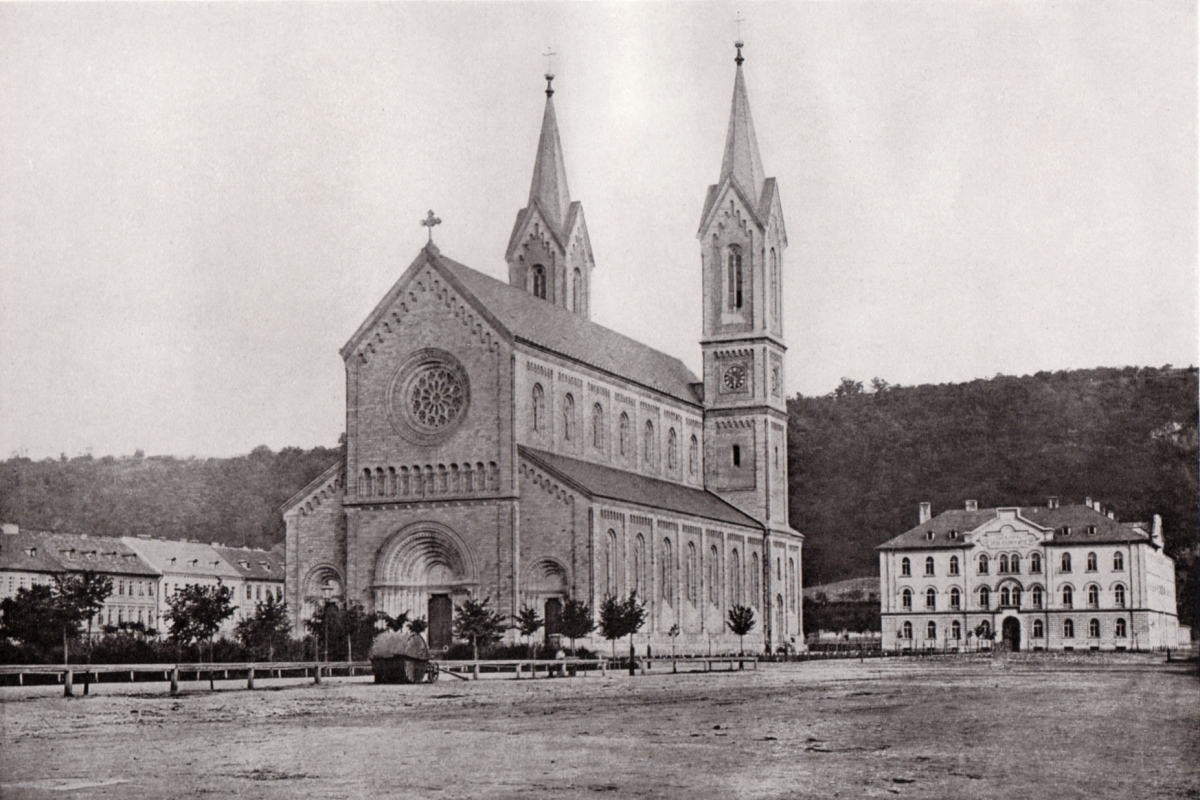
Church of Saints Cyril and Methodius, Prague 8 - Karlín, 1868

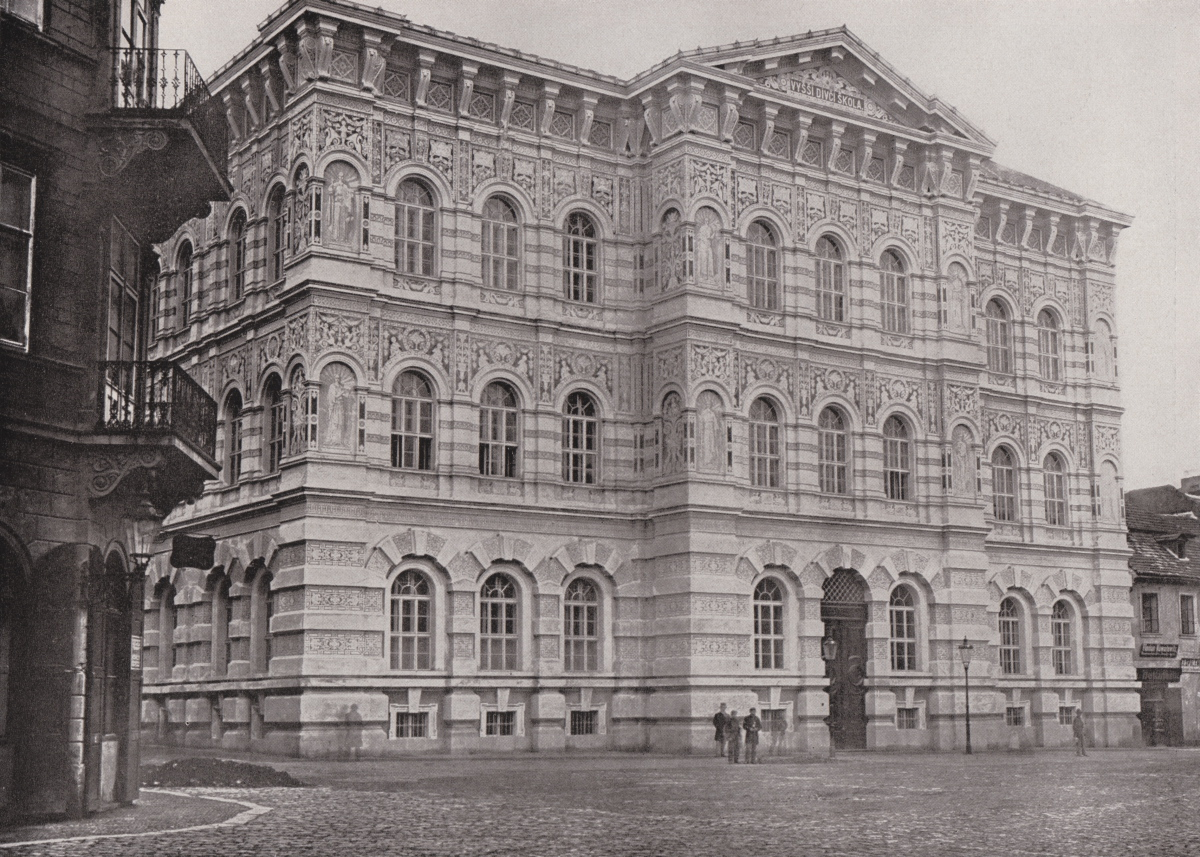
Girls' high school on Vodičkova, c. 1870
