= CERGE-EI =

Academic institution in Prague, Czech Republic

- Type: Public
- Established: 1991
- Director: Doc. Marek Kapička, Ph.D.
- Location: Prague, Czech Republic; 50°04′59.46″N 14°25′44.43″E
- Language: English
- Website: www.cerge-ei.cz

The Center for Economic Research and Graduate Education – Economics Institute, known as CERGE-EI (/ˌsɜːrdʒˌiːˈaɪ/) is an academic institution in Prague, Czech Republic, specialised in economics. The institute is a partnership between the Center for Economic Research and Graduate Education of Charles University and the Economics Institute of the Czech Academy of Sciences. It is located in the Schebek Palace in the center of Prague. Similar name is borne by CERGE-EI New York, a New York State Education Department entity with a permanent charter for its degree-granting educational programs awarded by the New York State Board of Regents. CERGE-EI New York awards U.S. MA and PhD degrees in Economics to students studying at CERGE-EI in Prague. After successfully completing their studies, these students also receive Czech diplomas.

The center was founded in 1991 by a group that included Jan Švejnar and Jozef Zieleniec, with a goal to educate a new generation of economists from post-communist countries. The school provides an American-style PhD program in economics, Master in Economic Research, and bachelor program EMO( Economics of Markets and Organizations) which is provided by the Faculty of Business Administration (FPH VŠE) in cooperation with CERGE-EI. CERGE-EI also conducts research in theoretical and policy-related economics.

== Students ==
There are approximately 120 students from over 30 countries, part of them from Central and Eastern Europe and the post-Soviet states. There are 20 permanent faculty members, most of whom have studied PhDs in economics from U.S. and Western European universities.

== Academic programs ==
=== The MA/PhD program ===
The PhD program is modelled on US graduate economics courses. Courses include Microeconomics, Macroeconomics, Econometrics in the first year, and a choice of elective subjects in the second year. A Master of Arts (MA) degree is awarded to students who complete the two years of coursework. CERGE-EI students frequently conduct part of their dissertation research at partner universities in Western Europe and North America. The dissertation usually consists of three scientific papers.

CERGE-EI is accredited by the Czech Ministry of Education, Youth and Sports and has a permanent charter from the Board of Regents of the New York State Education Department. The New York State Board granted CERGE-EI's permanent charter to award PhD and MA degrees in economics in 2005, following a temporary charter awarded in 2001.

CERGE-EI students frequently undertake research stays at leading universities such as MIT, Princeton University, Yale University, Columbia University, the University of Chicago, and the University of Copenhagen.

==== Financial aid ====
Many students admitted to the MA/PhD program are granted tuition waivers for the first two years of study. Almost all students who continue in the PhD program after the first two years are granted tuition waivers.

With the exception of first-year, first-semester students, students receiving a stipend are typically required to fulfill an assistantship (such as a research assistantship or teaching assistantship) each month as part of their study program. Fifth-year students receive funding in the form of a salary through employment as Junior Economic Institute Researchers (JEIRs). Selected third- and fourth-year students are eligible for this form of support as well.

=== The MER program ===
The Master in Economic Research program is a two-year full time Charles University program conducted in English.

=== AEP Study Abroad in Prague Program ===
In 2001, CERGE-EI and Charles University established the Undergraduate Program in Central European Studies (UPCES), a study abroad program in Prague for North American undergraduate students. The program's headquarters are in the CERGE-EI Schebek Palace. In 2025 the program was renamed Academic Experience in Prague (AEP). It is jointly offered by Charles University and CERGE-EI and supported by the CERGE-EI Foundation.

=== Visiting Master's Scheme ===
The Visiting Master's Scheme is run jointly by CERGE-EI and the Institute of Economics Studies (IES) at the Faculty of Social Sciences, Charles University in Prague. It combines the Master-level courses at the IES with the MA/PhD courses at CERGE-EI.

== Research ==
CERGE-EI was ranked #58 of 1,236 institutions worldwide by the Social Science Research Network (SSRN), in its ranking of the Top Economics Departments and Research Centers. Research Papers in Economics (RePEc) ranked CERGE-EI in the top 6 percent of economics departments/research institutions in Europe.

The permanent and visiting faculty of CERGE-EI is currently composed of members from the Czech Republic, Slovakia, Russia, Italy, Greece, Turkey, Croatia and the United States. CERGE-EI visiting faculty are part-time lecturers and dissertation committee members who regularly visit CERGE-EI. CERGE-EI was granted permission by Václav Havel to seek support for an endowed chair in political economy in his name.

CERGE-EI also supports advanced economic research; in the 1990s, CERGE-EI conducted thorough research on the economics of transition. As the post-communist countries developed into market economies, the research interests of CERGE-EI faculty and students have expanded to other areas of economics, such as dynamic macroeconomic theory, experimental economics, labor and public economics.

CERGE-EI publishes an in-house working paper series, organizes regular research seminars at which academics from universities around the world present their current papers, hosts professional conferences, and houses the largest economics library in Central and Eastern Europe.

=== GDN ===
CERGE-EI is the Central and East European Regional Network representative for the Global Development Network (GDN), a spin-off of the World Bank.

=== IDEA think tank ===
CERGE-EI has established the Institute for Democracy and Economic Analysis (IDEA), a public policy think-tank staffed by CERGE-EI academics and graduates, and researchers from other institutions.

== Funding ==
CERGE-EI is supported by the Czech Academy of Sciences and Charles University. The institution is also financed by educational and research grants from the Czech government and EU (ERC grants), and from other Czech and foreign entities, as well as private donations from individuals, foundations, and corporations. Fundraising activities are carried out by two affiliated institutions, CERGE-EI Foundation U.S.A. and Nadace CERGE-EI.

== Governance ==
CERGE-EI is governed by an Executive and Supervisory Committee (ESC), which makes major strategic and financial decisions, supervises local management, and makes decisions on the hiring and promotion of faculty members. The ESC is composed of internationally recognized scholars in the field of economics, representatives of Charles University and the Academy of Sciences, and tenured faculty members of CERGE-EI.

=== Members of the Executive and Supervisory Committee ===
- Philippe Aghion, Collège de France (Nobel Prize in Economics 2025)
- Stanislav Anatolyev, CERGE-EI
- Michal Bauer, CERGE-EI
- Jaroslav Borovička, New York University
- Michael C. Burda, Humboldt University of Berlin
- Henry W. Farber, Princeton University
- Yuriy Gorodnichenko, University of California, Berkeley
- Beata Javorcik, University of Oxford
- Byeongju Jeong, CERGE-EI
- Štěpán Jurajda, CERGE-EI
- Marek Kapička, CERGE-EI
- Jakub Kastl, Princeton University
- Michal Kejak, CERGE-EI
- Botond Kőszegi, University of Bonn
- Alan B. Krueger (in memoriam), Princeton University
- Alessandro Lizzeri, Princeton University
- Filip Matějka, CERGE-EI
- Nikolas Mittag, CERGE-EI
- Kevin M. Murphy, University of Chicago
- J. Peter Neary (in memoriam), University of Oxford
- Klara Peter, University of North Carolina at Chapel Hill
- Lucrezia Reichlin, London Business School
- Avner Shaked, University of Bonn
- Christopher A. Sims (Nobel Prize in Economics 2011), Princeton University
- Ctirad Slavík, CERGE-EI
- Sergey Slobodyan, CERGE-EI
- Jakub Steiner, CERGE-EI and University of Zurich
- Joseph Stiglitz (Nobel Prize in Economics 2001), Columbia University
- Jan Švejnar (Chair), Columbia University and CERGE-EI
- Jan Zápal, CERGE-EI
- Josef Zieleniec, New York University in Prague
- Stanley E. Zin, Leonard N. Stern School of Business
- Krešimir Žigić, CERGE-EI

== Sports ==
Students used to have organized an annual squash tournament. CERGE-EI students and faculty took part in the annual Prague Charity Softball tournament. Ping-pong tournaments, ski trips and trips to the countryside are also organized.
