= Clement Mary Hofbauer =

Austrian Redemptorist and saint

Saint Clement Mary Hofbauer CSsR
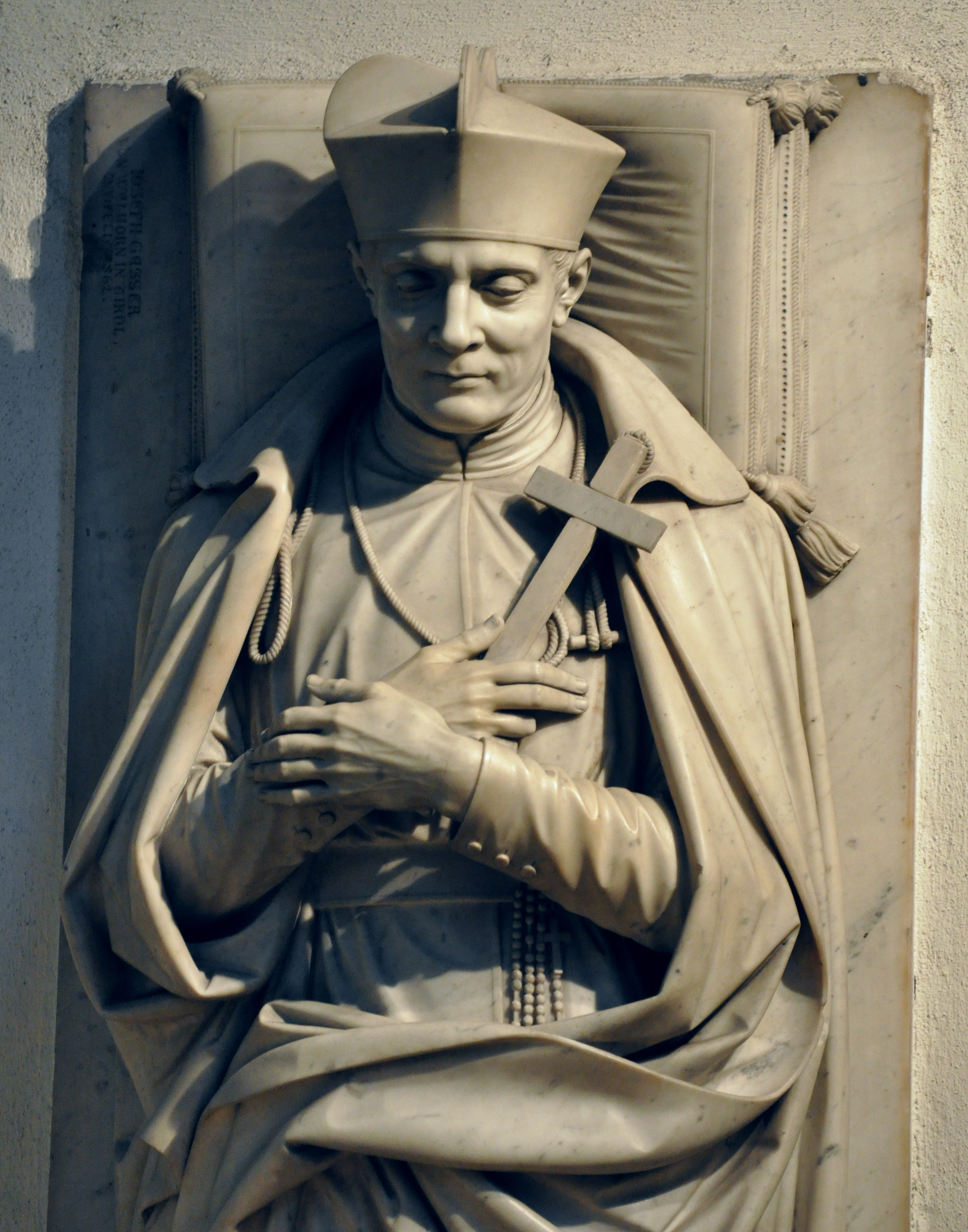
- Hofbauer's tombstone in the Church of Maria am Gestade, Vienna, Austria
- Born: Johannes Hofbauer; 26 December 1751; Tasovice, Margraviate of Moravia, Lands of the Bohemian Crown
- Died: 15 March 1820 (aged 68); Vienna, Austrian Empire
- Venerated in: Catholic Church
- Beatified: 29 January 1888 by Pope Leo XIII
- Canonized: 20 May 1909 by Pope Pius X
- Feast: 15 March (listed as 16 March in Franciscan Saint of the Day website)
- Patronage: Vienna, Austria

Clement Mary Hofbauer CSsR (Czech: Klement Maria Hofbauer; German: Klemens Maria Hofbauer) (26 December 1751 – 15 March 1820) was a Moravian hermit and later a priest of the Redemptorist congregation. He established his congregation, founded in Italy, north of the Alps. For this, he is considered a co-founder of the congregation. He was widely known for his lifelong dedication to care of the poor during a tumultuous period in Europe, that had left thousands destitute. He laboured in the care of the Polish people until expelled, when he moved to Austria.

Clement Mary Hofbauer is remembered as a saint in the Catholic Church where his feast day is 15 March, and listed on the Franciscan Saint of the Day calendar as 16 March, the day after the anniversary of his death. He is called the Apostle of Vienna, where he is a co-patron saint, along with St Colmán, St Leopold, and St Peter Canisius.

== Biography ==
=== Early life ===
He was born Johannes ("Hansl") Hofbauer on the feast of Saint Stephen (December 26) 1751, in Tasovice), in the Znojmo District of the Moravian region of what is now the Czech Republic. In English, his first name is John. He was the ninth of twelve children born to Maria Steer and Paul Hofbauer (Pavel Dvořák had changed the family name from the Czech "Dvořák" to the German "Hofbauer"). His father was a grazier and butcher.

Clement Mary Hofbauer's father died when he was six years old. In those days the ninth of a dozen children of a poor widow in a small village could have had little hope of getting into a seminary, nor of joining a religious order. Latin studies nevertheless started with the local parish priest, apparently signalling already a call to the priesthood, though a long and tortuous path lay ahead. When Hofbauer was just fourteen, extra studies ended abruptly with the death of the pastor. His replacement did not put aside time to continue the tuition.

=== Baker and hermit ===
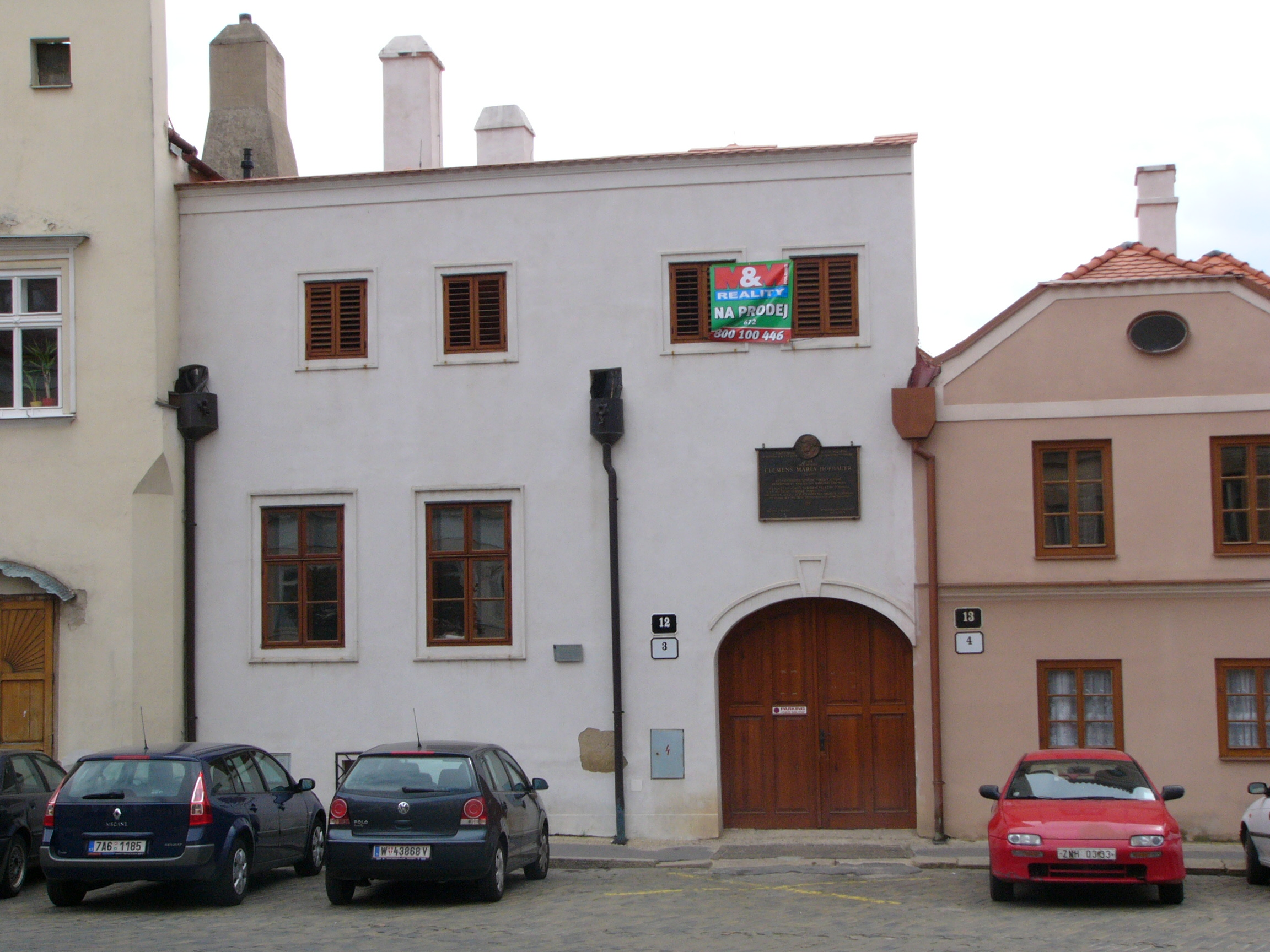
The building in Znojmo, where Clement-Mary Hofbauer was apprenticed as a baker 1767-1770

No longer studying, Hofbauer had to learn a trade. He was sent to become an apprentice in a bakery 8 km away in the local capital of Znojmo (in German called Znaim) in 1767. In 1770, he went to work 9 km from Tasovice, in the bakery of the priory in Louka of the Premonstratensian canons regular, also known as the White Canons. At that time, war and famine had left many dependent on this priory for help. Hofbauer slaved around the clock to feed those at the priory door.

He remained a servant at the priory until 1775, when he embarked on the life of a hermit. That, however, was aborted after eight years; the Emperor Joseph II, a proponent of enlightened absolutism, abolished all hermitages in the Habsburg Empire. Hofbauer moved to Vienna, once more to earn his keep as a baker.

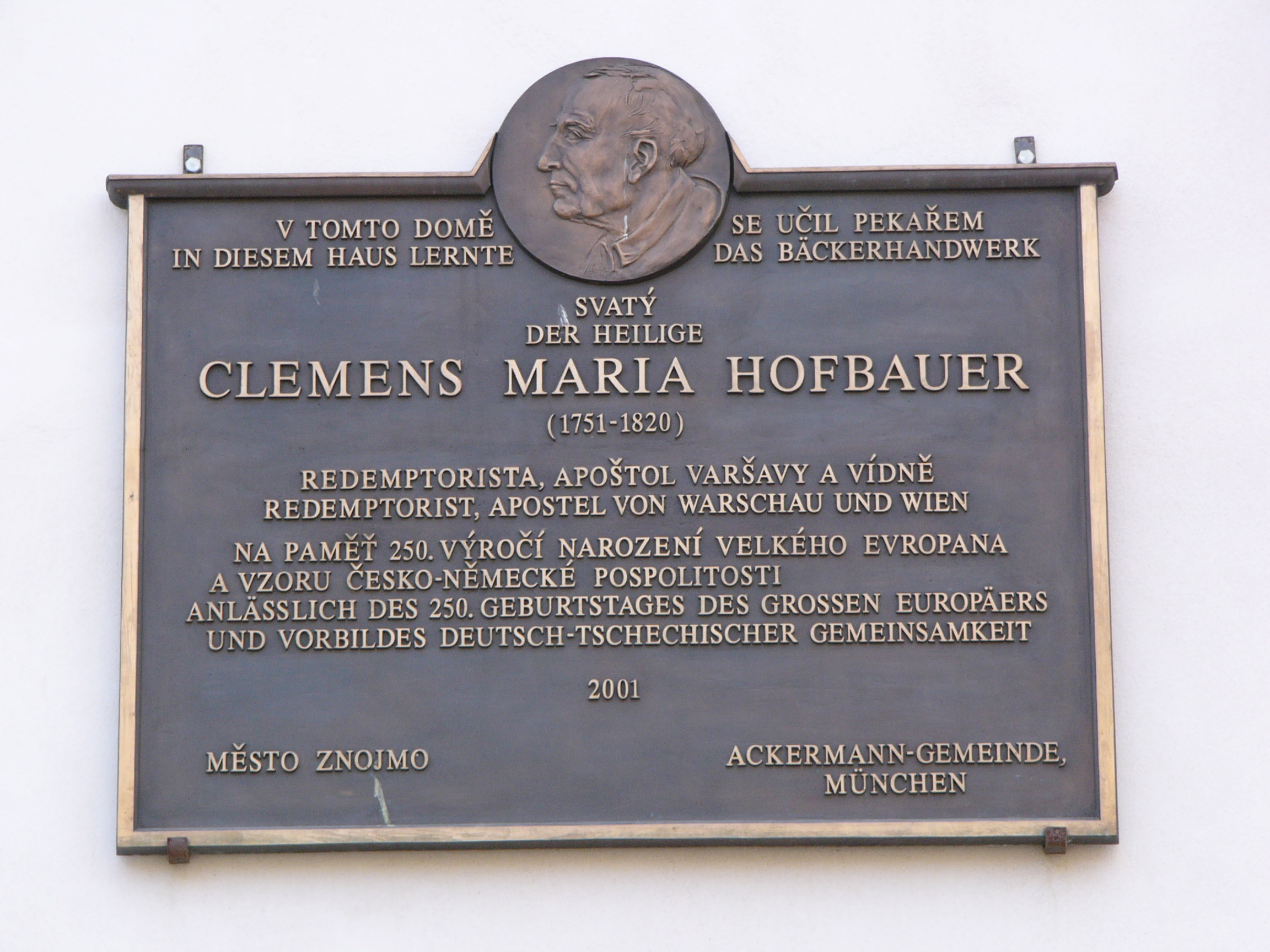
Memorial plaque on the Znojmo building where Hofbauer had been apprenticed to a baker

In 1782, after a pilgrimage to Rome, Clement-Mary Hofbauer found his way to Tivoli, in Italy. He resumed the life of a hermit, at the nearby shrine of Our Lady of Quintiliolo. This was under the patronage of the local bishop, Barnabas Chiaramonte (later Pope Pius VII), who clothed him in the religious habit of a hermit. This was when Hofbauer took the name of Clement Mary: Clement, most likely after St. Clement of Rome, and Mary in honour of the Virgin Mary. As a hermit, Hofbauer focused on oversight in prayer, appealing for himself and anyone who might neglect to pray. He made himself useful at the shrine, assisting pilgrims arriving there. After less than six months, however, he left Quintiliolo; while the force of praying for mankind could not be gainsaid, persistent was a call to the priesthood.

Hofbauer returned to the priory at Louka; to make himself useful baking bread again, and to resume studying Latin. At age 29, sponsored by two ladies he met while serving at Mass in the priory's basilica (dedicated to the Assumption and St. Wenceslas), Clement-Mary Hofbauer enrolled at the University of Vienna. Emperor Joseph's government had closed all seminaries. Students for the priesthood had to study at government-controlled universities. Theology courses permeated by Josephinism, rationalism etc. were frustrating. He was taught much that he found questionable. This notwithstanding, he had completed his philosophy studies by 1784. But he could proceed no further toward ordination: the emperor had forbidden religious communities from accepting new candidates.

=== Redemptorist ===
On the feast of Saint Joseph, 19 March 1785, Hofbauer and Hübl were clothed in the Redemptorist habit, publicly professing vows of poverty, chastity, and obedience. Ten days later, at the Cathedral of Alatri, they were ordained to the priesthood.

A few months after their ordination the first two Germanic Redemptorists were summoned by their Superior General, Fr. Francesco Antonio De Paola. They were to return and establish a Congregation of the Most Holy Redeemer north of the Alps. But in Clement-Mary Hofbauer's homeland this was out of the question, given Emperor Joseph II's autocracy. He was not about to countenance an evangelical religious institute, founded barely a generation earlier in Scala, to spawn within his own realm. (Note: In German Austria (including Bohemia, Moravia, and Galicia), religious houses had totalled 915 in 1700: 762 for men, and 153 for women. Of these, 388 (42%) had been required, under Emperor Joseph II to close; 280 for men, 108 for women.) Aware of this, the two Redemptorists moved on to the part of the Polish–Lithuanian Commonwealth that is now Poland. On their journey, the two were joined by Peter Kunzmann, another trained baker. Hofbauer and he had pilgrimaged together. He was to become the first non-Italian Redemptorist lay brother.

== Mission beyond the Alps ==
=== Warsaw ===
==== Background ====
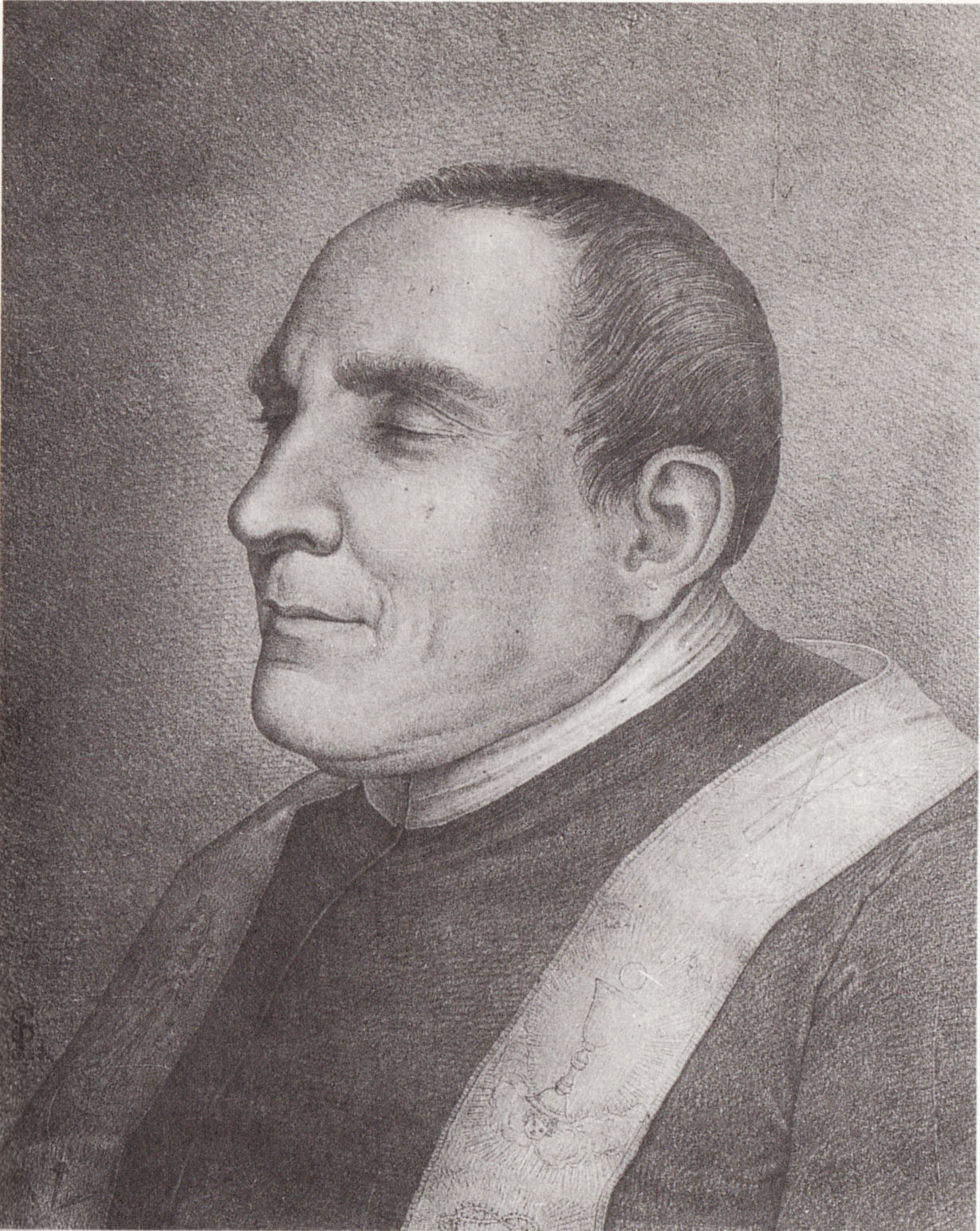
Portrait by R. Rinn

For more than two centuries the Polish–Lithuanian Commonwealth had been a large and unwieldy polity. After years of economic and military decline, vis-à-vis Russia in particular, there was turmoil when Hofbauer arrived in 1787. Under Catherine II's thumb, King Stanislaus II was virtually a puppet. Fifteen years earlier, a partition had been forced on the country, land being distributed between Austria, Russia, and Prussia.

In 1791, a parliamentary constitution (Note: With regard to resolutions of the General Sejm, "Constitution” had been a reality in Poland since the late 15th century. Dating back to 1493, the oldest drafts arose from the Chamber of Deputies. Under the “Nihil Novi” constitution of 1505: an act passed by the Sejm required consensus from the King, the lords of the council (the Senate) and deputies representing landed gentry (Chamber of Deputies).) was promulgated; historically the second written constitution after that of the United States in 1787. (Note: It was the European Enlightenment that had inspired this. Drawing from the work of the French Constituent Assembly, which had produced the Declaration of Human and Civil Rights of 26 August 1789 and the Constitution of 3 September 1791, the new Polish Constitution resembled the American Constitution of 1787. It owed much also to the recent development in Britain of a parliamentary monarchy; some elements drawn also from older Polish parliamentary democracy. After the partition in 1772, stronger institutions became the goal of the Polish-Lithuanian nobility. Abolished was the previous requirement for unanimity in parliamentary voting. Rights and privileges of the nobility were now extended to citizens of towns. The peasantry was to be legally protected. Enshrined were both religious toleration and the separation of powers.) The constitution “assumed a symbolic importance… It was the Bill of Rights of the Polish tradition, the embodiment of all that was enlightened and progressive in Poland’s past, a permanent reproach to the tyranny of the partitioning powers.” It “sought to create a modern, centralized republic.”. It was too late, however, to withstand the encircling hostile forces of autocracy. Such fears were voiced by the Prussian statesman Ewald von Hertzberg: "The Poles have given the coup de grâce to the Prussian monarchy by voting a constitution". Were the Polish–Lithuanian Commonwealth to grow in resilience, pressure would come to return what Prussia had recently purloined. The new constitution infuriated Empress Catherine. Poland's king was her former lover; she considered Poland a de facto protectorate. A chief author of Russian foreign policy, Alexander Bezborodko wrote "The worst possible news has arrived from Warsaw: the Polish king has become almost sovereign".

For Poland's neighbours, the links of Polish reformers with the French National Assembly reeked of revolution; throwing down the gauntlet before the absolute monarchies. Catherine intervened. By chance, Russia had just extricated herself from separate entanglements with Turkey and Sweden. Support was lent to a Polish anti-reform group, the Targowica Confederation. After barely a year, the machinery of the new constitution had been wrecked by Russian armies allied with conservative Polish nobility. In the War in Defence of the Constitution Polish loyalist forces were routed.

Another partition, as unsettling as the first, was to occur six years after Hofbauer arrived. This left 10 million (i.e. 71%) of the original population of 14 million disenfranchised; no longer under Polish rule. At yet another partition two years later (see Partitions of Poland), Poland ceased to exist.

Clement Mary Hofbauer and his team had been in Warsaw twelve years when, on 19 November 1799, Napoleon led a coup d'état in faraway Paris. Within a few years he announced he was an emperor, planning to claim an empire. From 1803 the armies of France under his command fought almost every European power, and acquired control of most of continental Europe, whether by conquest or alliance. In 1806 the Grande Armée took over the city where Hofbauer and his team were working. The Duchy of Warsaw was established as a client state. The impact of King Frederick Augustus' rule was subordinated to French requirements. What little remained in the Warsaw Duchy was now to resource military ambitions elsewhere.

Throughout Hofbauer's 21 years in Warsaw, he can have counted upon neither public security nor institutional stability. The three partitions of Poland brought about great bloodshed. Enemy forces were overwhelming, notwithstanding the endeavours of Tadeusz Kościuszko. Soon after his victory at Racławice, the fighting engulfed Warsaw during Holy Week of 1794. There followed the massacre of Warsaw's Praga district. Whether in reprisal or revenge, the Russian imperial army killed up to 20,000 civilians, regardless of gender and age. "The whole of Praga was strewn with dead bodies, blood was flowing in streams" wrote the Russian commander, Alexander Suvorov. Along with all Warsaw's residents, the Redemptorists' lives were in constant danger. Crashing through the church roof where they were based, bombs failed to explode on no less than three occasions.

==== Poverty ====
Back in February 1787, when the trio reached Warsaw, it had almost 120,000 people. Despite some 160 churches and 20 religious houses, charitable work cried out for attention: lots of people were poor and uneducated, their houses in disrepair.

They had arrived in Warsaw with no money; since Hofbauer had given their last three silver coins to beggars along the way. They met the apostolic delegate, Archbishop Saluzzo. With bad roads and wintery weather, he signalled his guests should stay in the capital for the time being. The bishop of Poznań, in whose diocese Warsaw lay, entrusted them with the church dedicated to St Benno, to serve the German-speaking people of Warsaw. Hofbauer and his companions were also charged with the interim care of a former Jesuit church. This was next to the cathedral; after the dissolution of the Jesuits in the Polish–Lithuanian Commonwealth fourteen years earlier, the church had fallen into disrepair. At the same time, an orphanage and a school for the families of manual craftsmen were put under their care. Charged with all this, Hofbauer and his companions had to see things through. They ended up remaining in Warsaw.

After an audience with King Stanisław August Poniatowski, Hofbauer and his companions gained material assistance. Help was promised also from the Commission of National Education, and the Sejm (Parliament) in Grodno. This notwithstanding, sometimes Hofbauer had to seek alms. The story goes that on one occasion he went begging at a local pub. When he asked for a donation, one of the customers scornfully spat beer into Hofbauer's face. Wiping off the beer, he responded, "That was for me. Now what do you have for my boys?" It is said that the astounded men in the bar were so full of remorse that they gave Hofbauer all their winnings, more than 100 silver coins.

When he saw a homeless boy on the street, Hofbauer brought him to the rectory, cleaned him up, fed him, and then taught him a trade and instructed him in the Christian way of life. When the number of boys grew too large for the rectory, Hofbauer opened the Child Jesus Refuge for his homeless boys. To keep the boys fed and clothed, he had to beg constantly. He did so unashamedly. Going into a bakery to buy a loaf of bread he came upon a master baker without an assistant. Hofbauer spent the day working at the dough trough and the oven, using all his old baking skills. He got bread for his boys that day, and for many days to come.

In 1791, four years after their arrival, the Redemptorists enlarged the children's refuge into an academy. The number of orphan boys continued to grow steadily. A boarding school had been opened for young girls under the direction of some noble Warsaw women. Money came from some regular benefactors and many others willing to help, but Hofbauer still had to beg from door to door seeking help for his many orphans.

When Hofbauer felt overwhelmed it is said he would stand before the Blessed Sacrament and cry out: "Lord, help! It's high time...". Hofbauer was loved not only by his pupils, but also in more intellectual circles. It is reported that he accompanied the struggles of his pupils, advising them, teaching them, feeding them and guiding them through everyday life.

==== Evangelisation ====
When the Redemptorists first opened their church they preached to empty benches. People apparently found it hard to trust these foreign priests. Many others had lapsed from Catholicism, some to adopt Freemasonry. To help restore the Catholic faith, Hofbauer and his companions set to work.

As they began to learn Polish, the Redemptorists expanded their apostolate to others living in the area around their church. An expanded team (Hofbauer, five Redemptorist priests and three lay brothers) began a "Perpetual Mission". Weekday Mass gave way to a full-scale mission every day of the year. Attending St. Benno's any weekday a person might hear no less than five sermons, in German and Polish. The week's programme involved three High Masses, the office of the Blessed Virgin Mary, public visits to the Blessed Sacrament, the Way of the Cross, vespers, prayer services, and litanies. To hear confession, a priest was available at any hour of the day or night.

By 1793, Hofbauer had been appointed vicar-general of the Redemptorist Congregation north of the Alps. With Warsaw as centre, he founded new establishments of the Congregation in Germany and in Switzerland.

Street battles were to reach Warsaw (see above). Hofbauer and his companions appealed for peace. This only served to fuel suspicion and they became labelled as traitors. Persecutions started in 1795, when Warsaw came under Prussian occupation. Hofbauer appealed directly to the Prussian king. Memoranda to him from Hofbauer record that attending the elementary school were 256 boys and 187 girls; that this was Warsaw's only school for girls; that the children were poor and receiving their tuition free; that many were homeless and orphans, housed at school free of charge. All to no avail. The decree arrived to close the school.

In time St. Benno's became the thriving centre of the Catholic Church in Warsaw. By the year 1800, growth was palpable, both in the work at the church and in the Redemptorist community. Reception of the sacraments had risen from 2,000 (in 1787) to over 100,000.

From among the boys under his care, Clement Mary Hofbauer started to recruit future Redemptorists. After ensuring they got into junior high schools, he himself undertook teaching them philosophy and theology, maintaining this until presented for ordination. He had seven priests after eight years. A novitiate was also founded. There were 18 priests by 1803. In 1808 there were 36 Redemptorists.

After the French took over in 1806 a law was passed that forbade local pastors from letting the Redemptorists preach missions in their parishes. There followed an even harsher prohibition from preaching and hearing confessions in their own church of St. Benno's. King Frederick Augustus I was powerless to stop those who wished rid of the Redemptorists. At the request of Marshal Davout, Napoleon signed an order (9 June 1808) that they be transported (20 June) to the fortress in Kostrzyn nad Odrą. They were released after a month, but not allowed to return to Poland.

=== Vienna ===
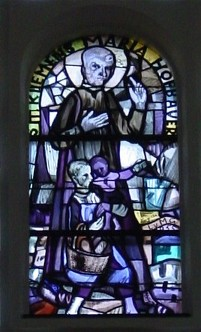
Stained glass window portraying St. Clement-Mary Hofbauer, parish church of Liesing, by Martin Häusle (2006)

Hofbauer arrived in Vienna that September. He remained there until his death almost 13 years later. In 1809, when the forces of Napoleon attacked Vienna, Hofbauer worked as a hospital chaplain caring for the many wounded soldiers. The archbishop, seeing Hofbauer's zeal, asked him to care for a little Italian church in Vienna. He remained there for four years until he was appointed chaplain to the Ursuline Sisters in July 1813. Attending to the spiritual welfare of the nuns and lay people who came to their chapel, Hofbauer gained a reputation as a powerful preacher and gentle confessor.

In the early days of the 19th century, Vienna was a major cultural center of Europe. Hofbauer enjoyed spending time with the students and the intellectuals. Hofbauer took care of young people, especially students at the university. He was always ready to offer support, both spiritual and material. Students came, singly and in groups, to his quarters to talk, share a meal, or get advice. A good many of them later became Redemptorists. Under his influence, one of the students under his spiritual care, Frederic Baraga, decided to become a priest. Baraga went on to become the first Slovenian missionary in the United States and an influential missionary to the Ottawa and Ojibwa tribes in the Great Lakes region of the United States.

A coterie of the learned and educated among the Viennese gathered around Clement Mary Hofbauer. Through them there developed a redeeming influence on others, fuelling religious revival in Austria. Notable and artistic people he shepherded into the Catholic Church included Karl Wilhelm Friedrich Schlegel, Dorothea von Schlegel (daughter of the philosopher Moses Mendelssohn), Friedrich August von Klinkowström the artist, Joseph von Pilat (Metternich's private secretary), Zacharias Werner (later to be ordained and become a great preacher) and Frederick von Held. This last mentioned became a Redemptorist and was instrumental in the Congregation being founded in Ireland. It is very much thanks to Clement Mary Hofbauer that Wessenberg's plan to include Vienna in a German national church failed.

After an interval, Hofbauer again found himself under attack. For a short while he was prohibited from preaching. Because he had been communicating with his Redemptorist Superior General in Rome, he was threatened with expulsion. Before this could be enacted, the authorising document had to be signed off by the Austrian Emperor Franz. At the time, the emperor was on pilgrimage in Rome, where he visited Pope Pius VII. It was impressed upon the emperor to what a huge extent the work of Clement Mary Hofbauer had been appreciated. For Hofbauer's years of dedicated service, the emperor was encouraged to reward him by sanctioning a Redemptorist foundation in Austria. Instead of a writ of expulsion, Clement-Mary Hofbauer found himself invited to an audience with Emperor Franz. A church was selected and refurbished to become the first Redemptorist foundation in Austria. However, it was to be started without Hofbauer. He fell ill in early March 1820, and had died by 15 March. Clement Mary Hofbauer's funeral was a big event in Vienna.

Revolution broke out in Vienna on 13 March 1848. The State Chancellor Metternich was overthrown. The press was released from censorship. A constitution was proclaimed. Within six months, all feudal obligations on peasants were abolished. In the lead up to 1848, polarisation between and within organised religions had long been pervasive. Tensions with the state were often admixed with mutual mistrust whether within Catholicism or between members of different Christian confessions. Whatever might have been the immediate cause, the Redemptorists' presence in Austria came to an end. Lost in the mêlée were the provincial archives of the order, and documents relating to Clement Mary Hofbauer's activities.

The mortal remains of Clement Mary Hofbauer were exhumed in 1862 and transferred to Vienna's Redemptorist church.

== Veneration ==
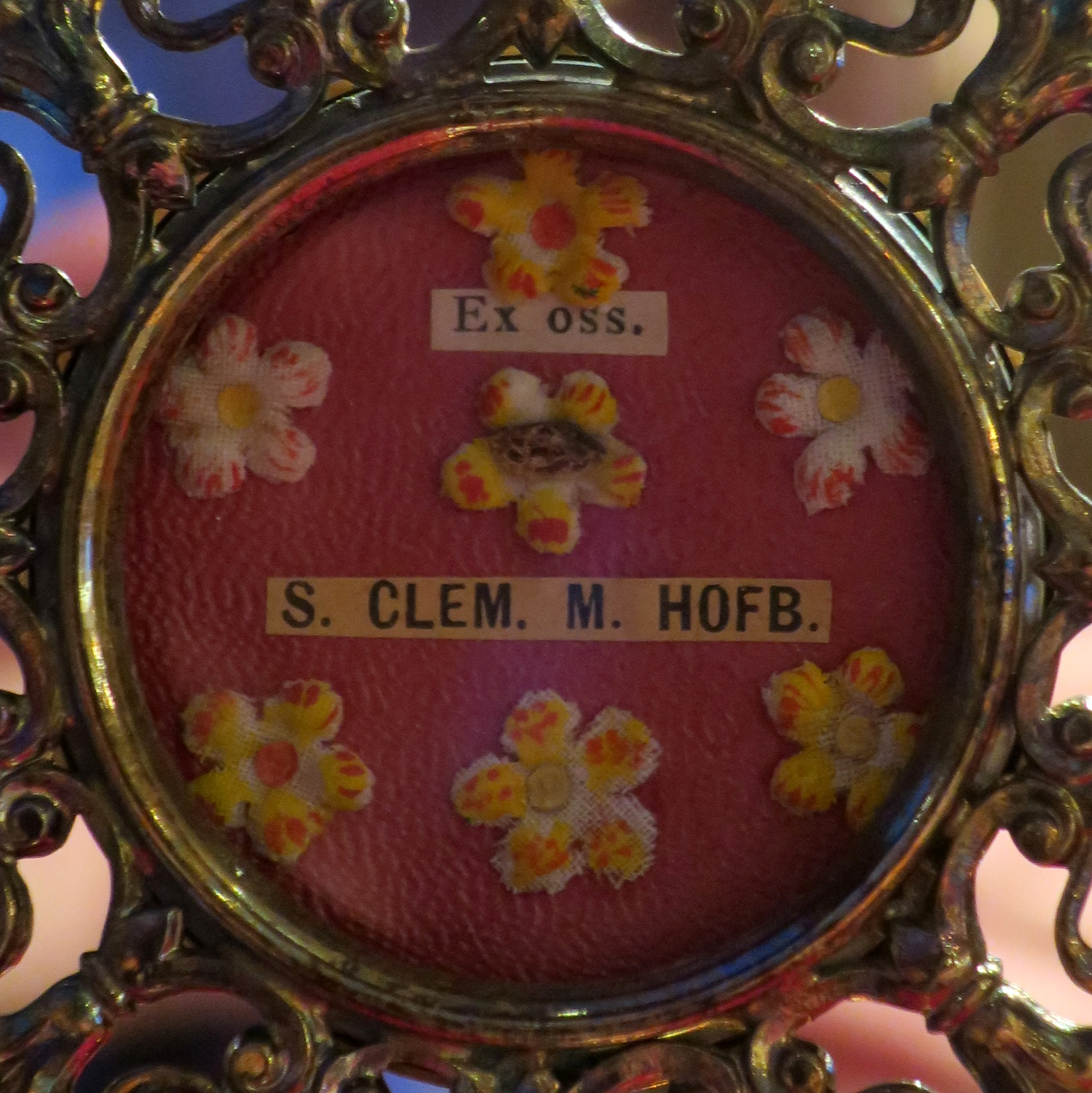
A relic of St. Clement-Mary Hofbauer on display for veneration in Lima, Ohio.

In 1888, Pope Leo XIII started the process of canonisation with beatification, and 21 years later Clement Mary Hofbauer was recognised as a saint by Pope St. Pius X.

Acknowledging Hofbauer's 21 most fruitful years in Warsaw, his inclusion in the catalogue of Polish saints was enacted by the Polish Episcopate. Besides being a patron saint of bakers and waiters, he is one of the patron saints of Warsaw.

In his iconography Saint Clement Mary Hofbauer is depicted in the Redemptorist habit. His attribute is the cross.

While the liturgical feast day of Saint Clement Mary Hofbauer is listed as 15 March, on their Saint of the Day website, Franciscans have his feast day listed as 16 March, the day after the anniversary of his death.

A few months after Hofbauer's canonisation, a parish church was established under his patronage at West 44th Street and 10th Avenue in New York City, which served the Polish community. It was closed in the late 1960s. Two years later, in 1911, the St.-Clemens-Kirche was established in Berlin.

Clement-Mary Hofbauer is the patron saint of the Catholic student centre's chapel at Dartmouth College.

== Legacy ==
Hofbauer is one of the figures immortalised in Jan Matejko's 1891 painting, Constitution of 3 May 1791.

== Gallery ==
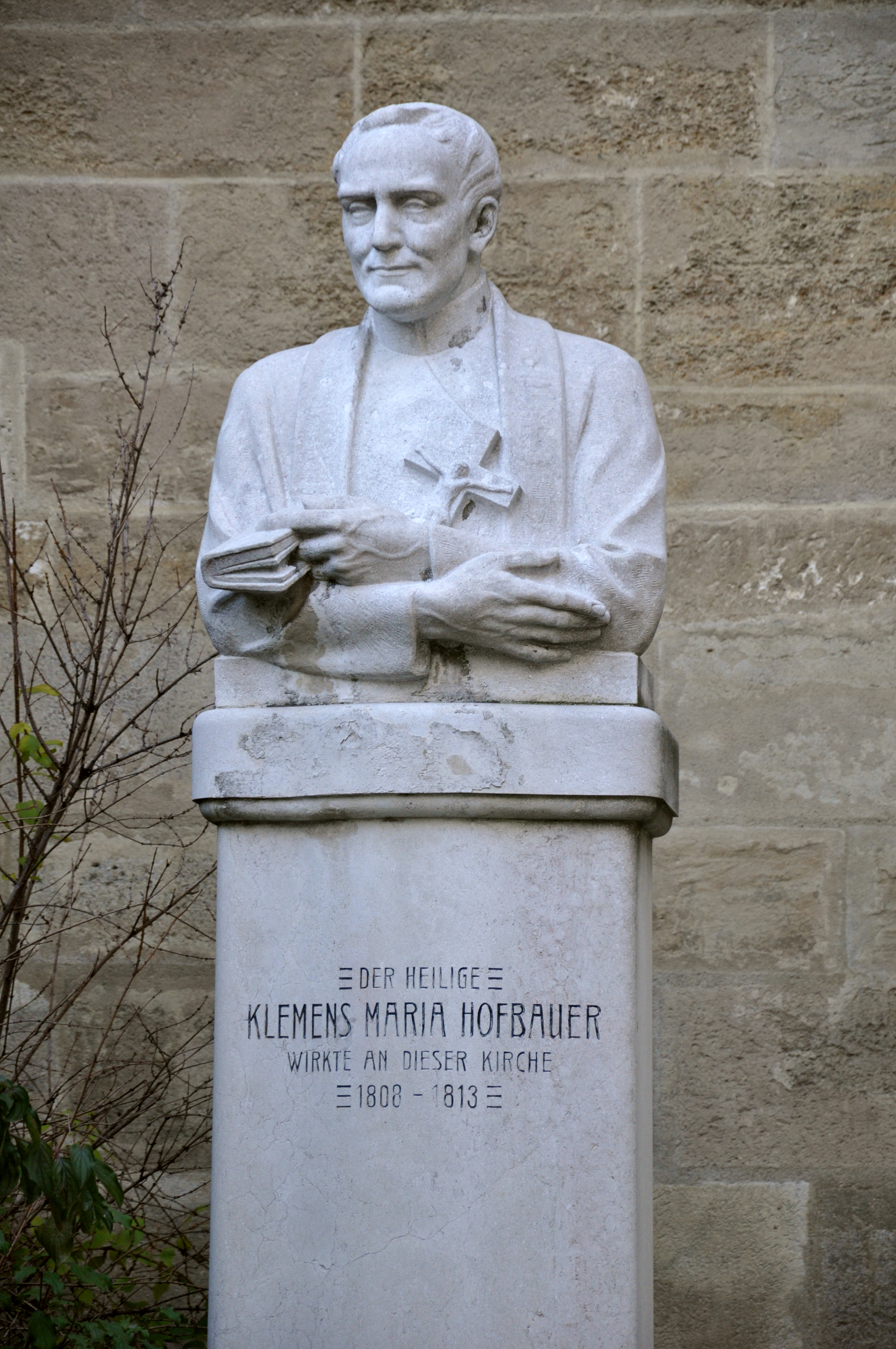
Klemens Maria Hofbauer statue, Minoritenplatz, Vienna

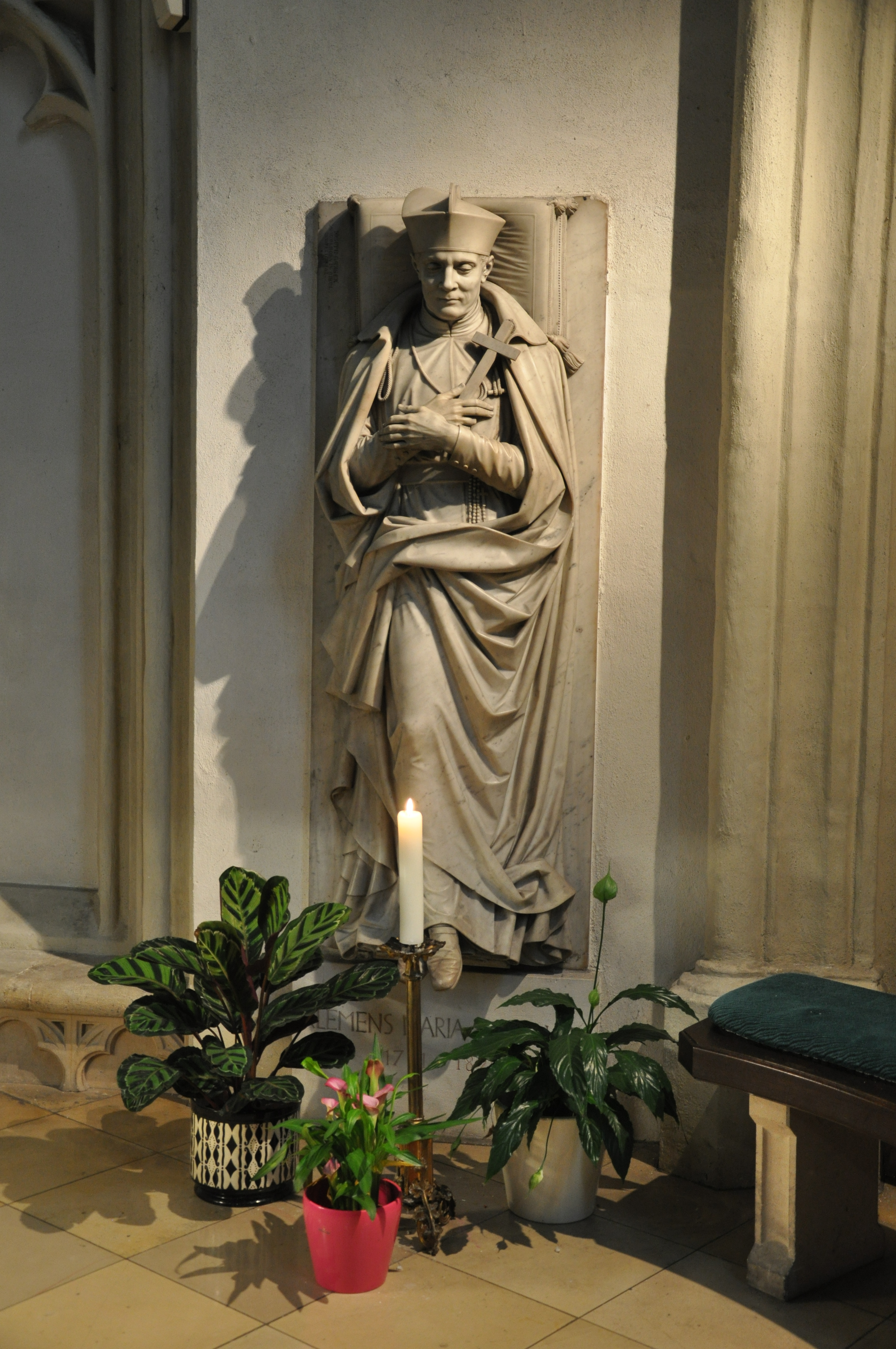
Tombstone, Maria am Gestade, Vienna

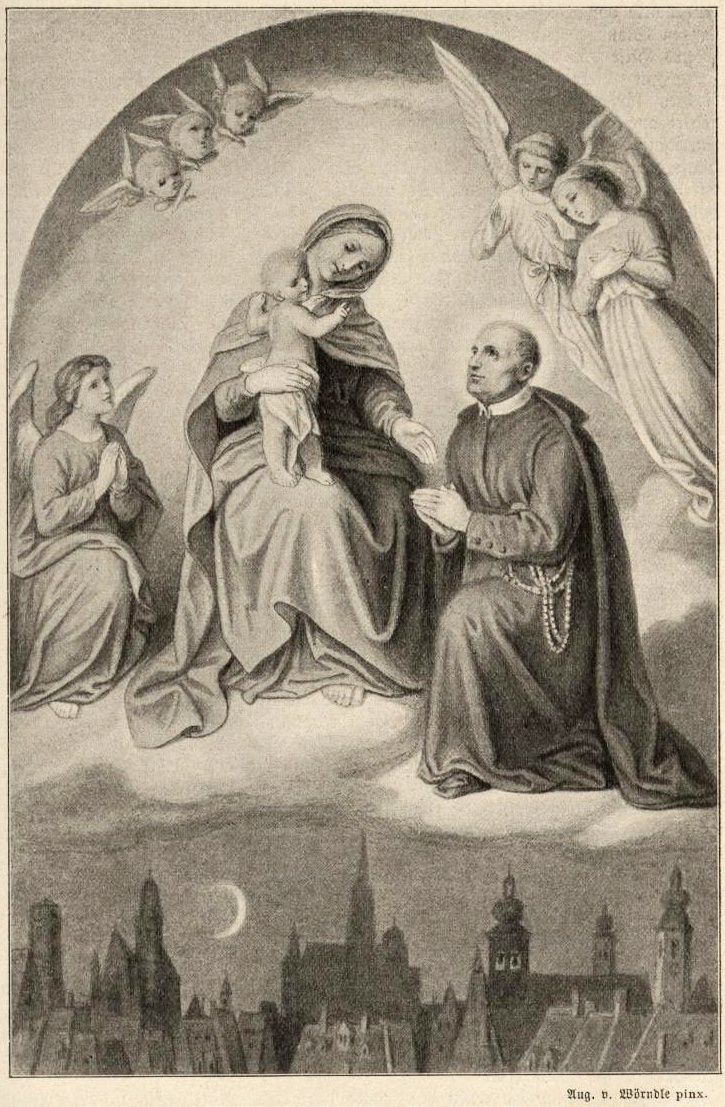
Drawing by August von Wörndle von Adelsfried, c. 1902
