= Johann Jahn =

German orientalist

Johann Jahn (18 June 1750 in Tasswitz, Moravia – 16 August 1816 in Vienna) was a German orientalist. He was born in the Holy Roman Empire and died in the Austrian Empire

== Biography ==
He studied at the Faculty of Philosophy of University of Olomouc, and in 1772 began his theological studies at the Premonstratensian convent of Bruck, near Znaim. Having been ordained in 1775, he for a short time held a cure at Misslitz, but was soon recalled to Bruck as professor of Oriental languages and Biblical hermeneutics.

On the suppression of the convent by Joseph II in 1784, Jahn took up similar work in Olomouc, and in 1789 he was transferred to Vienna as professor of Oriental languages, biblical archaeology and dogmatics. In 1792 he published his Einleitung ins Alte Testament (2 volumes), which soon brought him into trouble; the cardinal-archbishop of Vienna laid a complaint against him for having departed from the traditional teaching of the Church, e.g. by asserting Job, Jonah, Tobit and Judith to be didactic poems, and the cases of demoniacal possession in the New Testament to be cases of dangerous disease. An ecclesiastical commission reported that the views themselves were not necessarily heretical, but that Jahn had erred in showing too little consideration for the views of German Catholic theologians in coming into conflict with his bishop, and in raising difficult problems by which the unlearned might be led astray. He was accordingly advised to modify his expressions in future.

Although he appears honestly to have accepted this judgment, the hostility of his opponents did not cease until at last (1806) he was compelled to accept a canonry at St Stephens, Vienna, which involved the resignation of his chair. This step had been preceded by the condemnation of his Introductio in libros sacros veteris foederis in compendium redacta, published in 1804, and also of his Archaeologia biblica in compendium redacta (1805). The only work of importance, outside the region of mere philology, afterwards published by him, was the Enchiridion Hermeneuticae (1812).

== Works ==
- Einleitung ins Alte Testament (2 volumes, 1792)
- Hebräische Sprachlehre fur Anfänger (1792)
- Aramäische od. Chaldäische u. Syrische Sprachlehre für Anfänger (1793)
- Arabische Sprachlehre (1796)
- Elementarbuch der hebr. Sprache (1799)
- Chaldäische Chrestomathie (1800)
- Arabische Chrestomathie (1802)
- Lexicon arabico-latinum chrestomathiae arabicae accommodatum (Vindobonae, Wappler et Beck, 1802)
- Introductio in libros sacros veteris foederis in compendium redacta (1804; 3rd edition, 1825; translated into English by Turner and Whittingham, New York, 1827)
- Archaeologia biblica in compendium redacta (1805) The English translation by T. C. Upham (1840) has passed through several editions.
- an edition of the Hebrew Bible (1806)
- Grammatica linguae hebraicae (1809)
- Enchiridion Hermeneuticae (1812)
- Vaticinia prophetarum de Jesu Messia, a critical commentary on the Messianic passages of the Old Testament (1815)
- Nachträge, six dissertations on Biblical subjects (1821)
