= Tasovice (Znojmo District) =

- Municipality
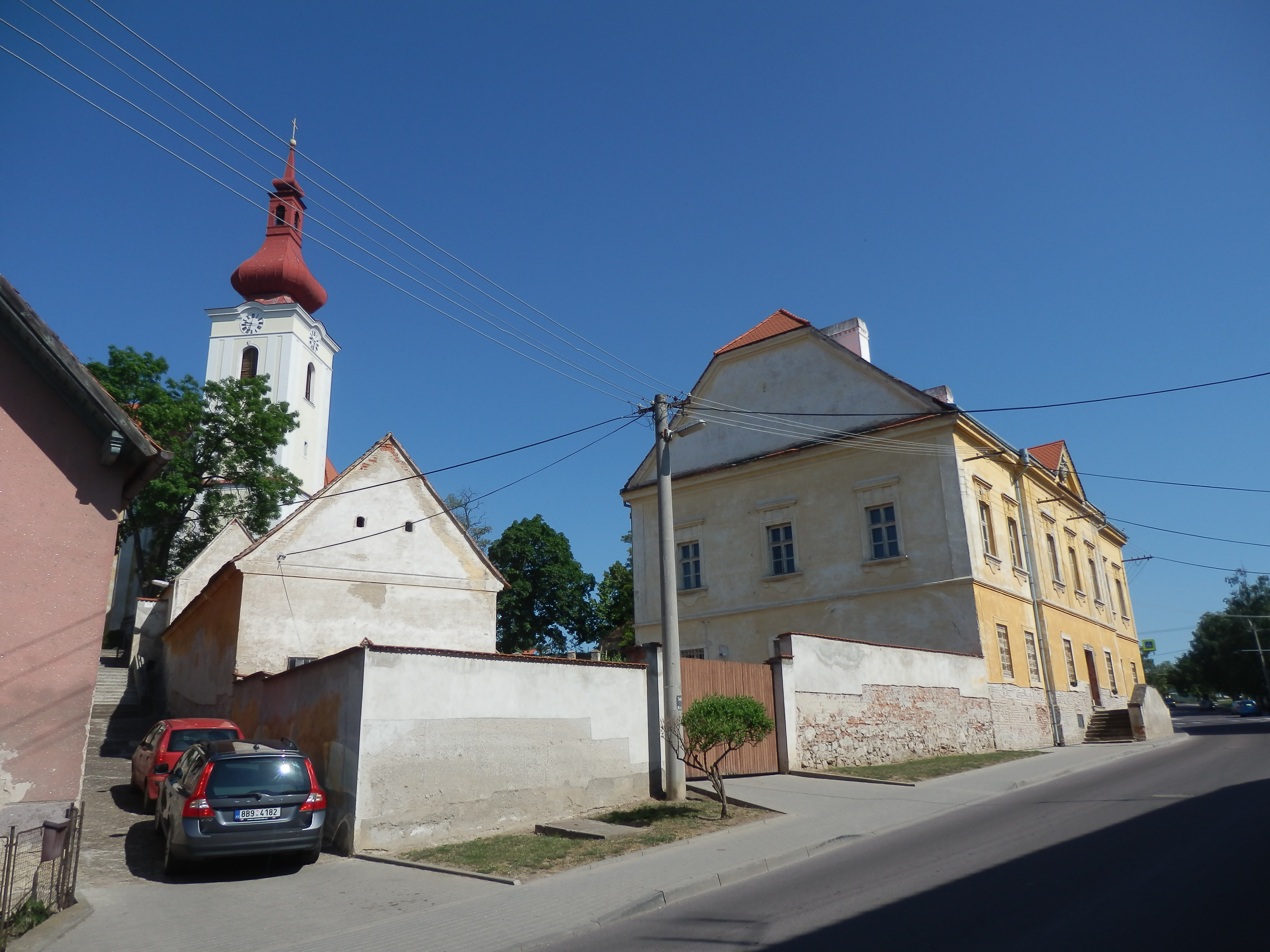
- Rectory and the Church of the Assumption of the Virgin Mary

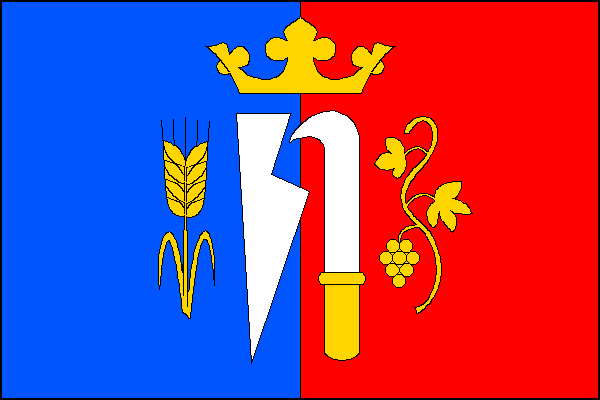
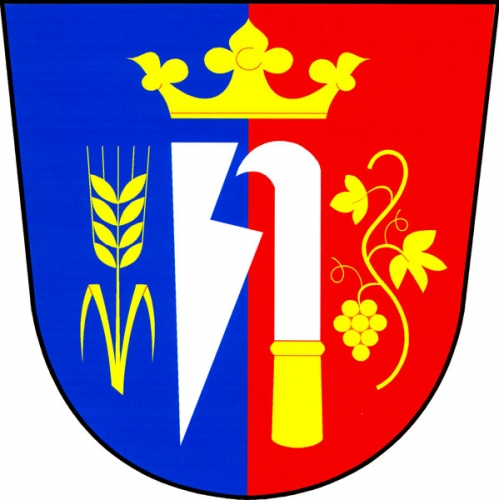
- Flag Coat of arms

- Location in the Czech Republic
- Coordinates: 48°50′10″N 16°9′20″E
- Country: Czech Republic
- Region: South Moravian
- District: Znojmo
- First mentioned: 1234

Area
  - Total: 15.90 km^{2} (6.14 sq mi)
- Elevation: 210 m (690 ft)

Population (2026-01-01)
  - Total: 1,429
  - Density: 89.87/km^{2} (232.8/sq mi)
- Time zone: UTC+1 (CET)
  - Summer (DST): UTC+2 (CEST)
- Postal code: 671 25
- Website: www.tasovice.cz

Tasovice (German: Taßwitz) is a municipality and village in Znojmo District in the South Moravian Region of the Czech Republic. It has about 1,400 inhabitants.

Tasovice lies approximately 9 kilometres (6 mi) east of Znojmo, 53 km (33 mi) south-west of Brno, and 187 km (116 mi) south-east of Prague.

== Demographics ==
Historical population
Year	Pop.	±%
1869	1,145	—
1880	1,215	+6.1%
1890	1,203	−1.0%
1900	1,281	+6.5%
1910	1,407	+9.8%
1921	1,498	+6.5%
1930	1,493	−0.3%
1950	1,252	−16.1%
1961	1,294	+3.4%
1970	1,173	−9.4%
1980	1,083	−7.7%
1991	1,157	+6.8%
2001	1,226	+6.0%
2011	1,291	+5.3%
2021	1,303	+0.9%
Source: Censuses

== Notable people ==
- Johann Jahn (1750–1816), German orientalist
- Clement Mary Hofbauer (1751–1820), hermit and priest of the Redemptorist congregation
- Matouš Trmal (born 1998), footballer
