= Maria am Gestade =

Gothic church in Vienna, Austria

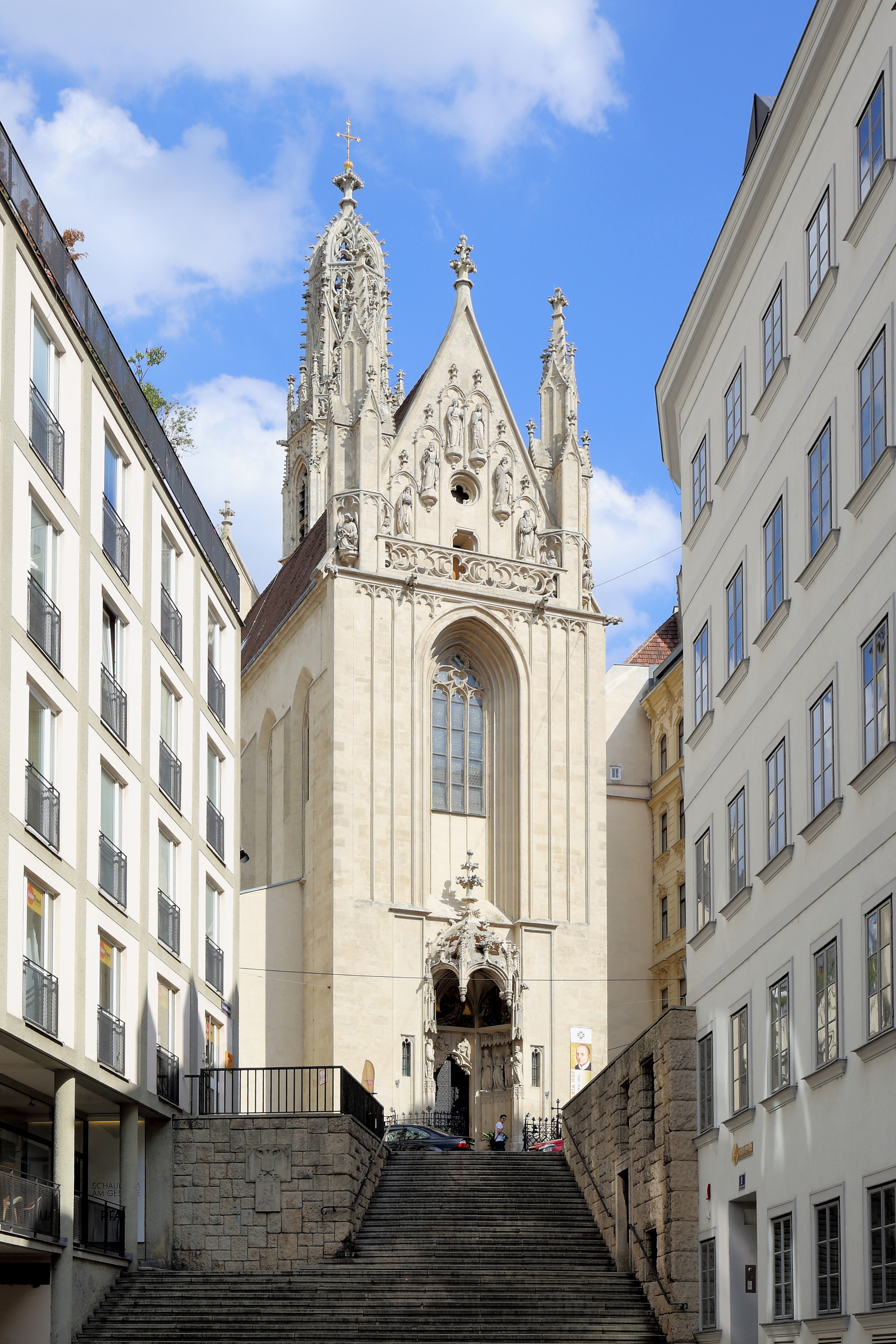
- Maria am Gestade in Vienna, Austria

- Location within Vienna

Religion
- Affiliation: Catholic Church
- Ecclesiastical or organisational status: Active
- Leadership: P. Dominic O'Toole, CSsR
- Year consecrated: 1414

Location
- Location: Vienna, Austria
- State: Vienna
- Coordinates: 48.212833°N 16.370528°E

Architecture
- Type: Church
- Style: Gothic
- Groundbreaking: 1394
- Completed: 1414

Specifications
- Direction of façade: NW
- Length: 65 m (213 ft)
- Width: 20 m (66 ft)
- Width (nave): 10 m (32.8 ft)
- Height (max): 56 m (183.7 ft)

Website
- maria-am-gestade.redemptoristen.at

Maria am Gestade (Austrian German pronunciation: [maˈriːa am ɡɛˈʃtaːdɛ], lat. S. Maria in Litore, eng. St. Mary at the Riverbank) is a Gothic church in Vienna, Austria. One of the oldest churches in the city — along with St. Rupert's Church and St. Stephens Cathedral — it is one of the few surviving examples of Gothic architecture in Vienna. Located in the Innere Stadt at Salvatorgasse 12, near the Donaukanal, the church was traditionally used by sailors on the Danube river. The name reflects the former location on the Fluvial terrace of an arm of the Danube river, prior to its regulation.

== History ==
It is said that there was a wooden church at this place in the 9th century, although this has been disputed, which served as a place of worship for fishermen and sailors. The church is first mentioned in documents from 1158. The present building was built between 1394 and 1414 in gothic style. The first reference occurs in 1137, indirectly, and more explicitly in 1200.

The ownership of the land appears obscure, variously passing into the hands of the Diocese of Passau in Bavaria, the nearby Schottenstift, and Viennese families. From 1302, the church was owned by the Herren von Greif. Between 1330 and 1355 a new choir was constructed and was probably conceived as a family burial ground. In 1409, the church became a more permanent part of the Passau diocese, giving its name to the surrounding precinct (Passauer Platz) and remained an enclave when the Archdiocese of Vienna was established in 1469.

The church was deconsecrated in 1786 and gradually became dilapidated and parts were torn down. It was used as an arsenal and stable during Napoleon's occupation of Vienna in 1809. In 1812, the church was renovated and newly consecrated, coming into the hands of the Redemptorist order. The Gothic choir windows were taken to Laxenburg in Lower Austria and installed in Franzensburg castle. The church was further restored in 1900 and again in 1930, mainly involving the figures in the portico.

The church is associated with the English, French and Czech catholic communities in Vienna.

== Description ==
=== Tower ===
The church's most striking characteristic is the 56 m (180 ft) high open work tower, built in 1419-1428 in Gothic scrollwork. It is recognisable from a great distance and is depicted on the oldest images of the city.

=== Choir ===
The choir, whose construction was begun at the same time as the tower around 1330 contains two high gothic panels (1460). The windows contain surviving fragments of mediæval stained glass.

=== Nave ===
The nave which, due to the limited space, is narrower than the choir. Because of the then course of the Danube arm the nave is slightly bent. Construction was started in 1400, and it is said that Duke Albrecht III himself was the builder.

The builder of the choir and the tower was Michael Knab, who also produced the (later modified) plan for the towers of St. Stephen's cathedral, and was succeeded by Peter Prachatitz, also a master builder.

=== Porticos ===
The church has three porticos that are decorated with reliefs and figures. The choir door shows a Virgin of Mercy and a Coronation of the Virgin, both dating from around 1350, as deduced from during the Middle Portal which has realistic depictions of angels playing musical instruments.

On the main portal on the west facade, canopies crown reliefs of the two Saint Johns (Baptist and Evangelist) from about 1410, in a style also seen at Prague's St. Vitus Cathedral and a range of sculptures and mosaic decoration, which date from the 20th century.

=== Art and ornamentation ===
An Annunciation in the nave of the church dates from about 1360 and is attributed to the Meister der Minoritenwerkstatt whose work also appears in Vienna's Minoritenkirche. The Virgin's partial disengagement from the wall and the spatial independence of the gestures are considered to make this an important transitional piece of the High Gothic.

The pulpit is a Gothic Revival structure installed in 1820 during the renovation of the church which aimed to restore its medieval appearance. The wooden structure was affixed on the huge medieval pillar between the nave and the choir with a bridge connecting it to the door that was cut in the northern wall. The colour scheme is olive and gold, with blind tracery decoration on the balustrade and the rear wall. The abat-voix is crowned with the statue of Christ as Salvator Mundi under a pinnacled baldachin. The previous pulpit was erected in 1727 on the same spot in Baroque style.

== Gallery ==
=== Exterior ===
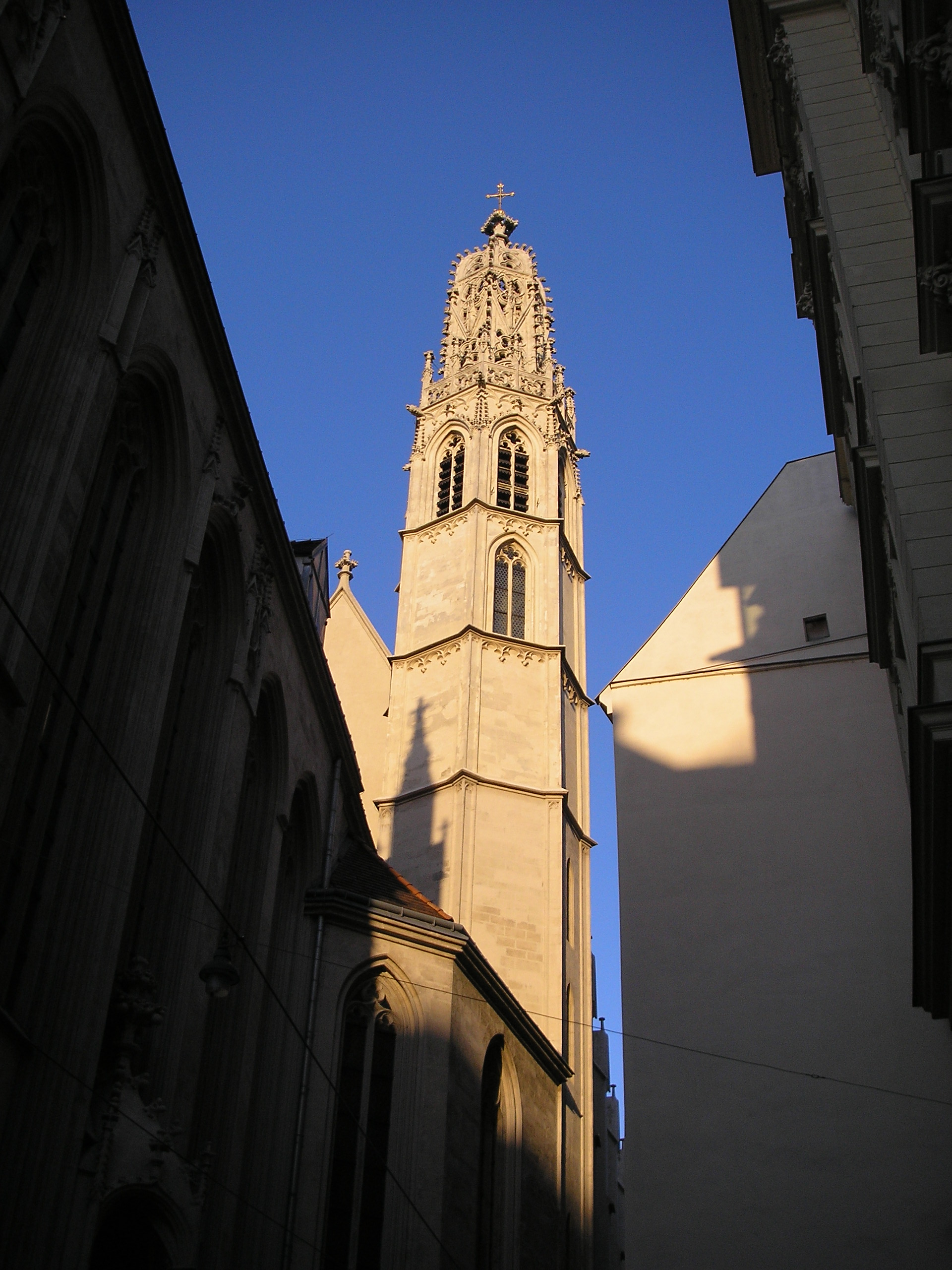
Maria am Gestade

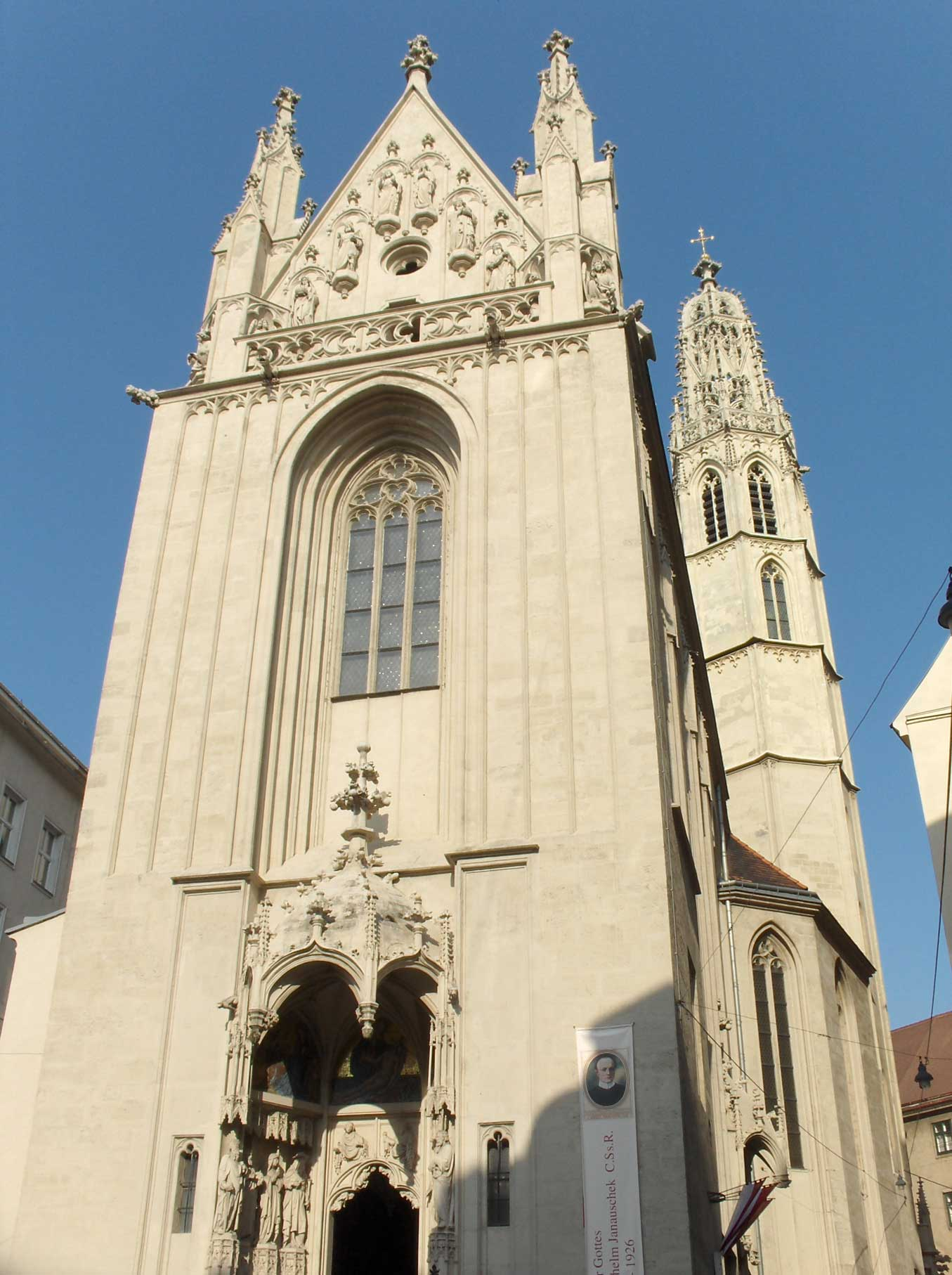
Maria am Gestade

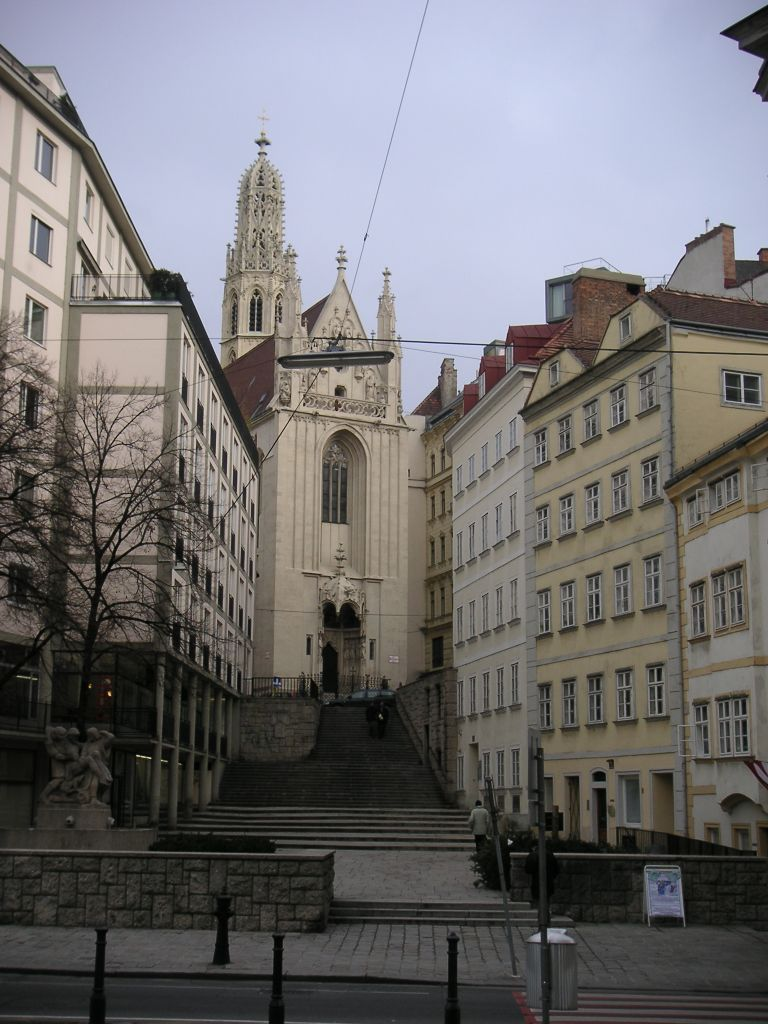
Maria am Gestade

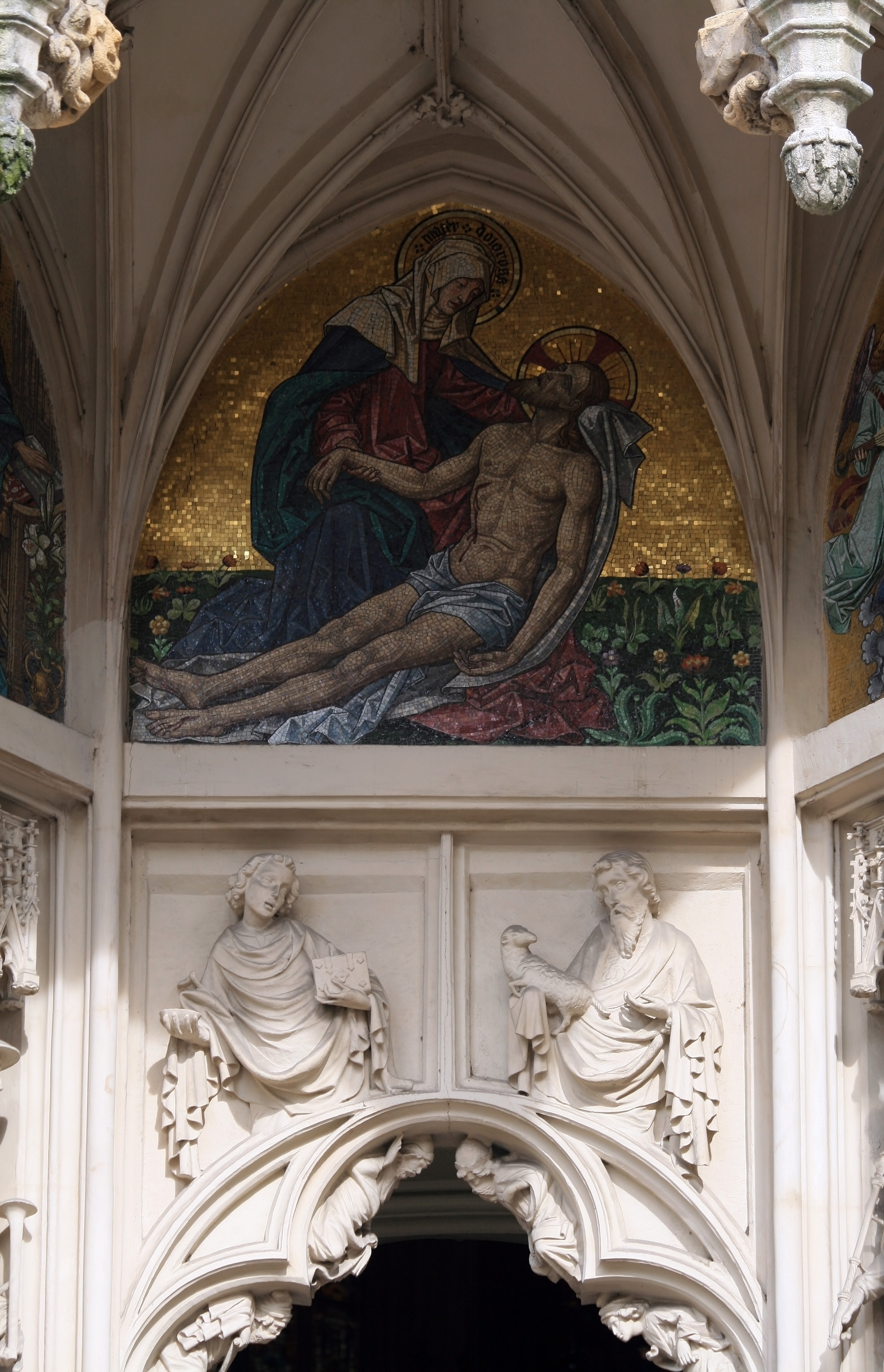
West portal

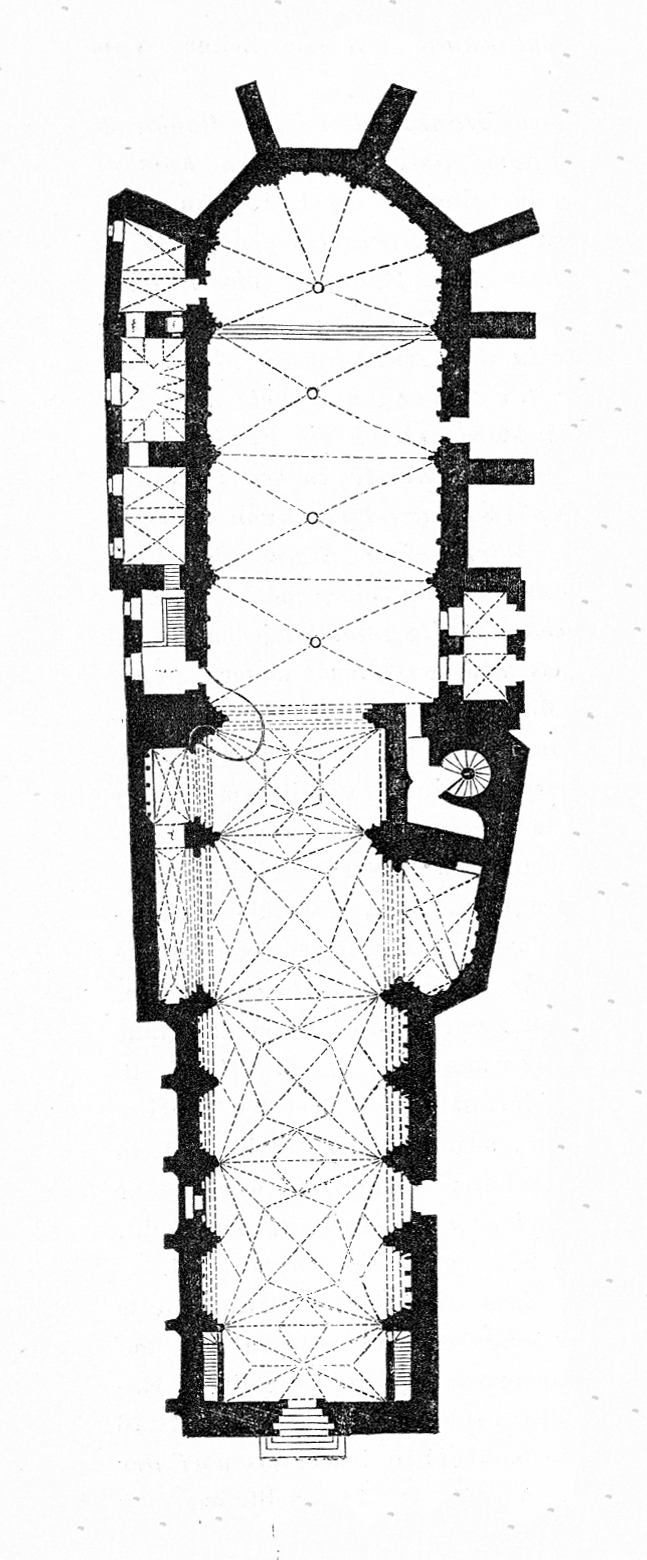
Floor plan of church

=== Interior ===
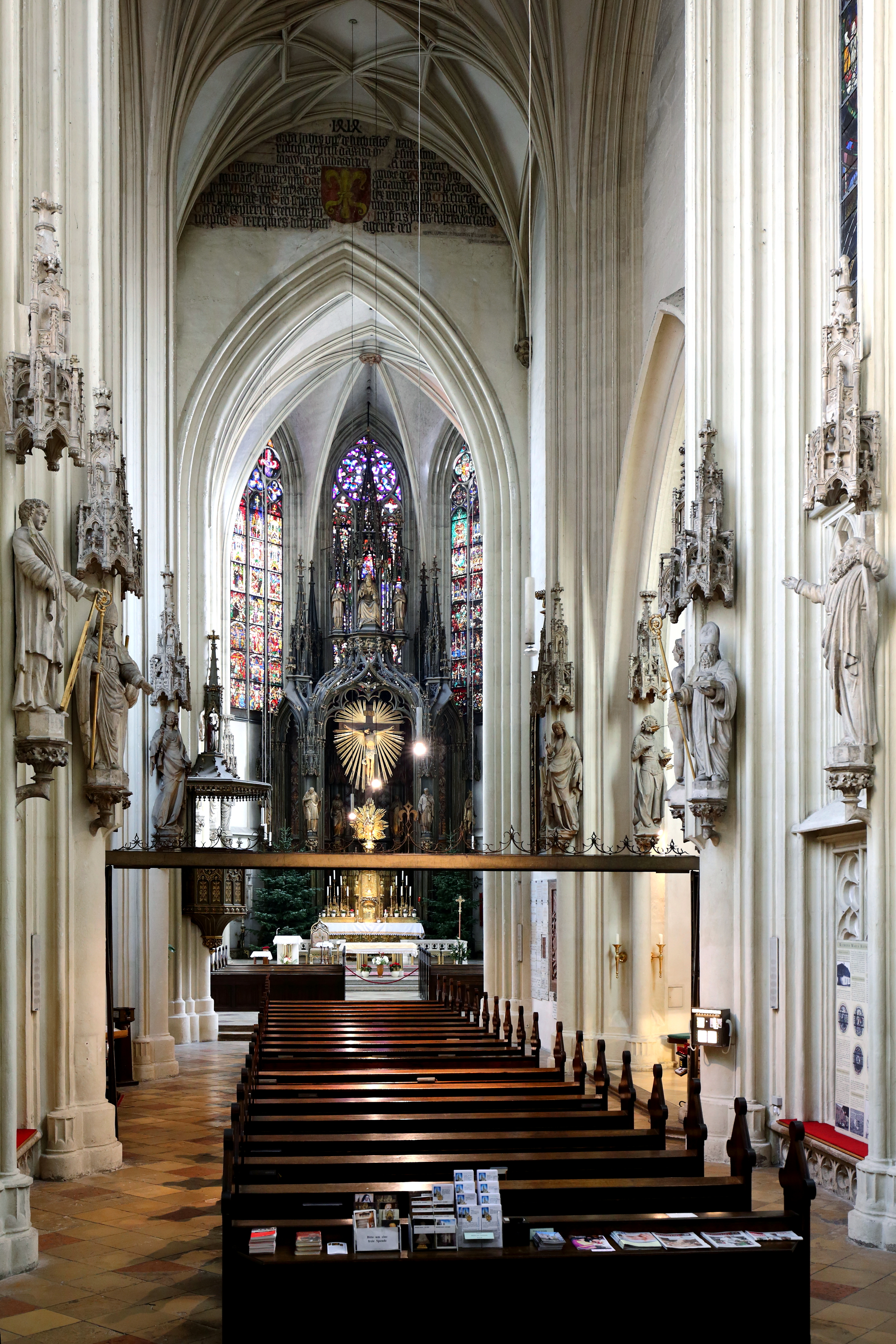
Interior

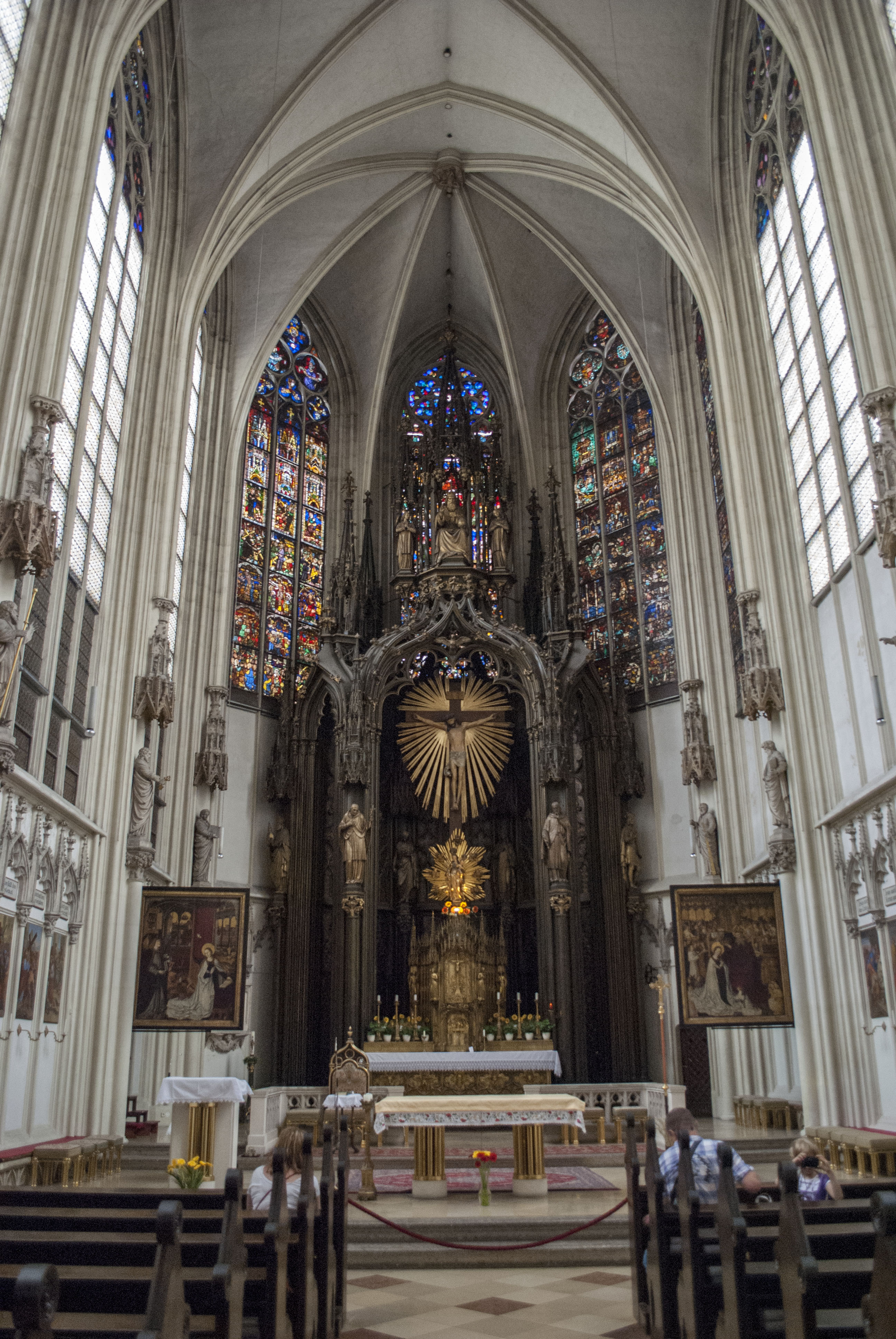
Interior

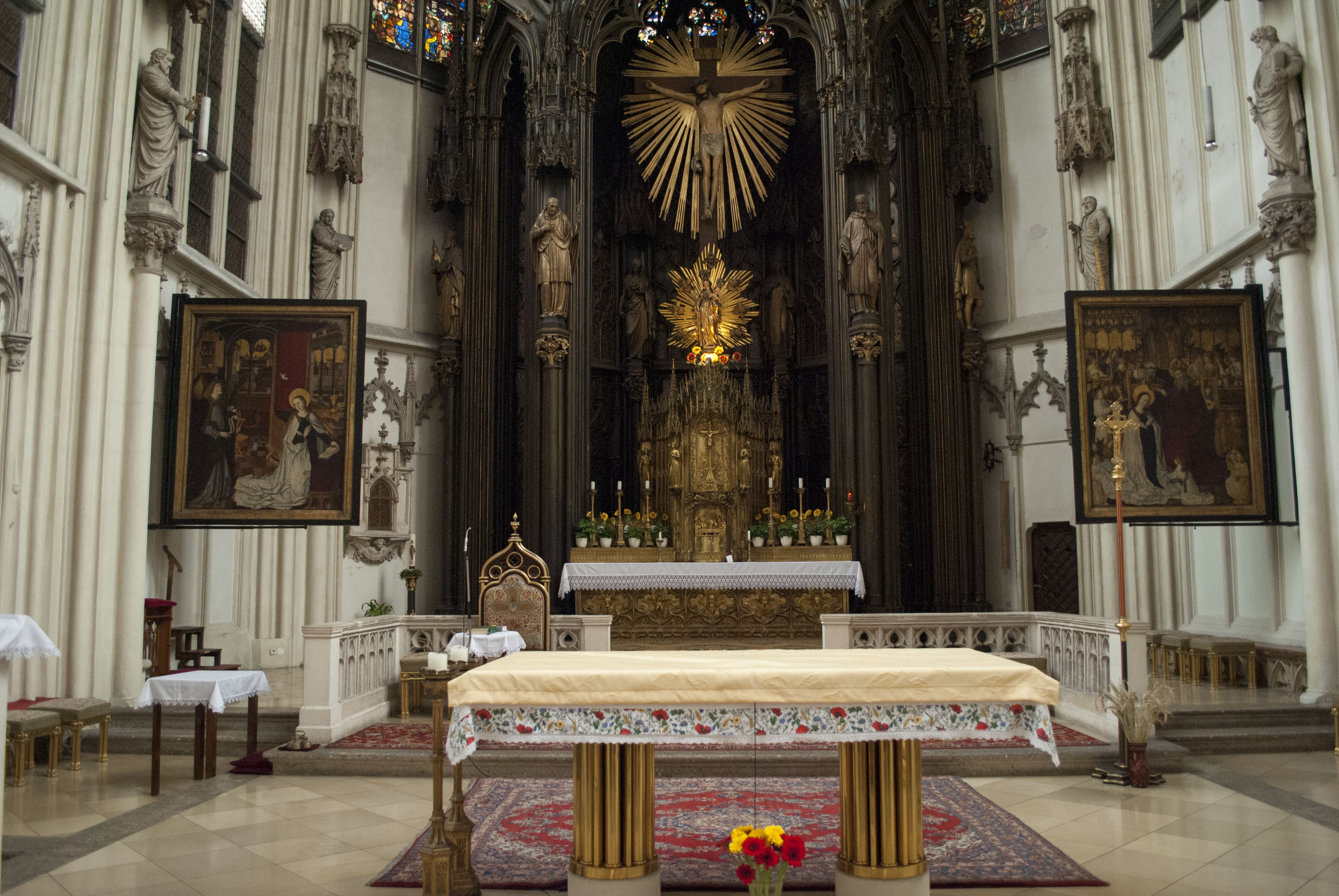
Altar

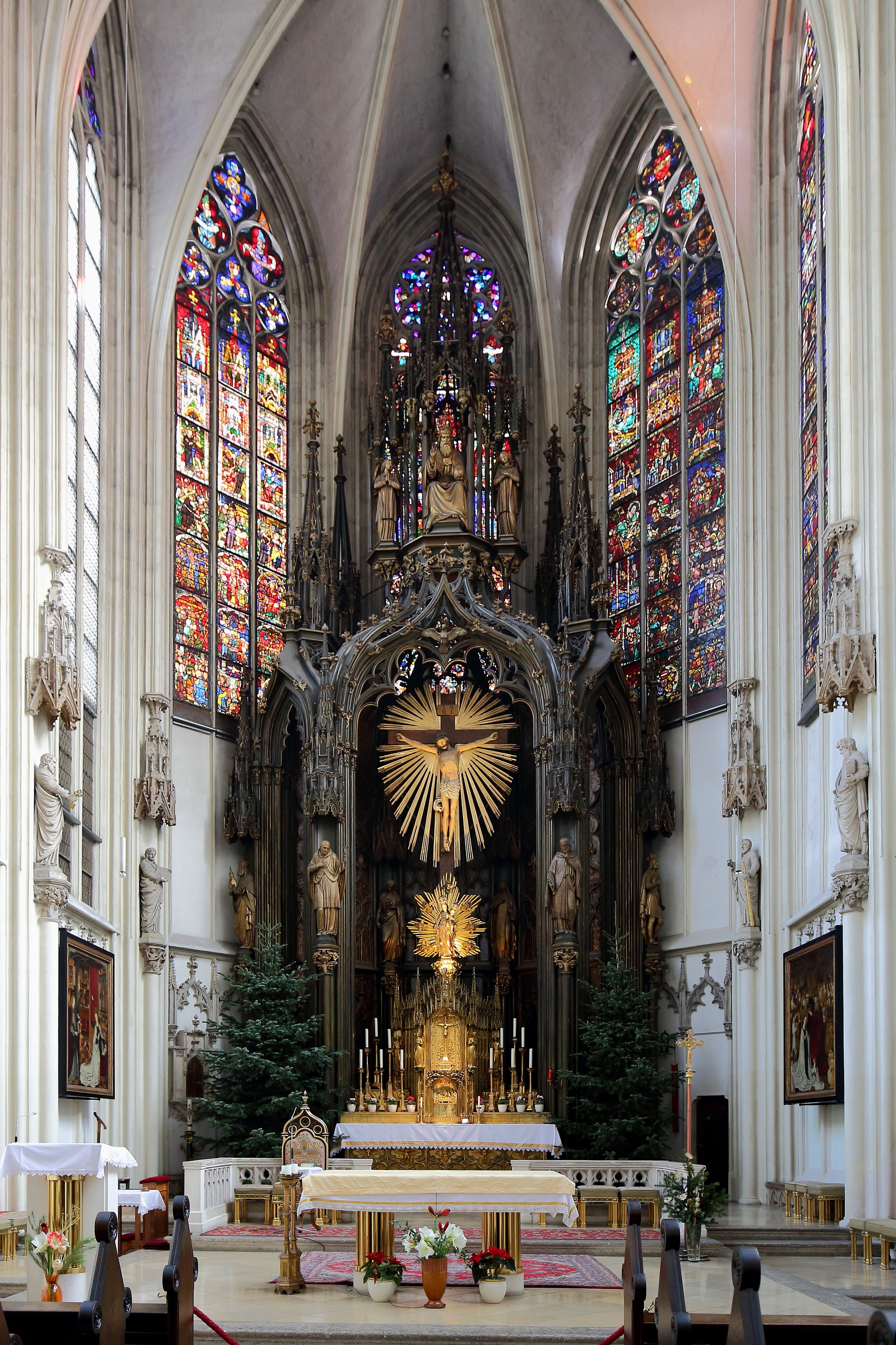
Altar

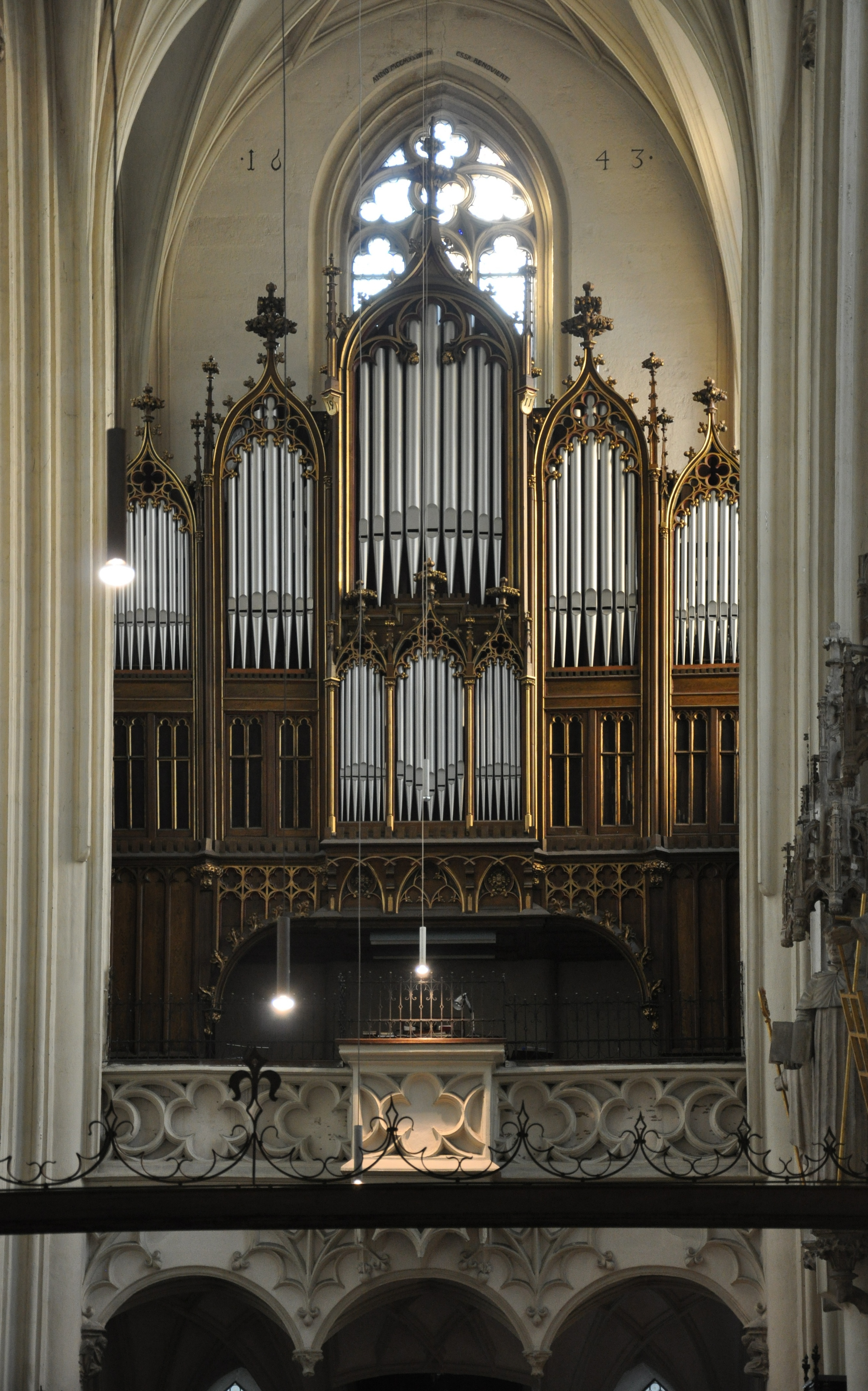
Pipe organ by Matthäus Mauracher Jr.

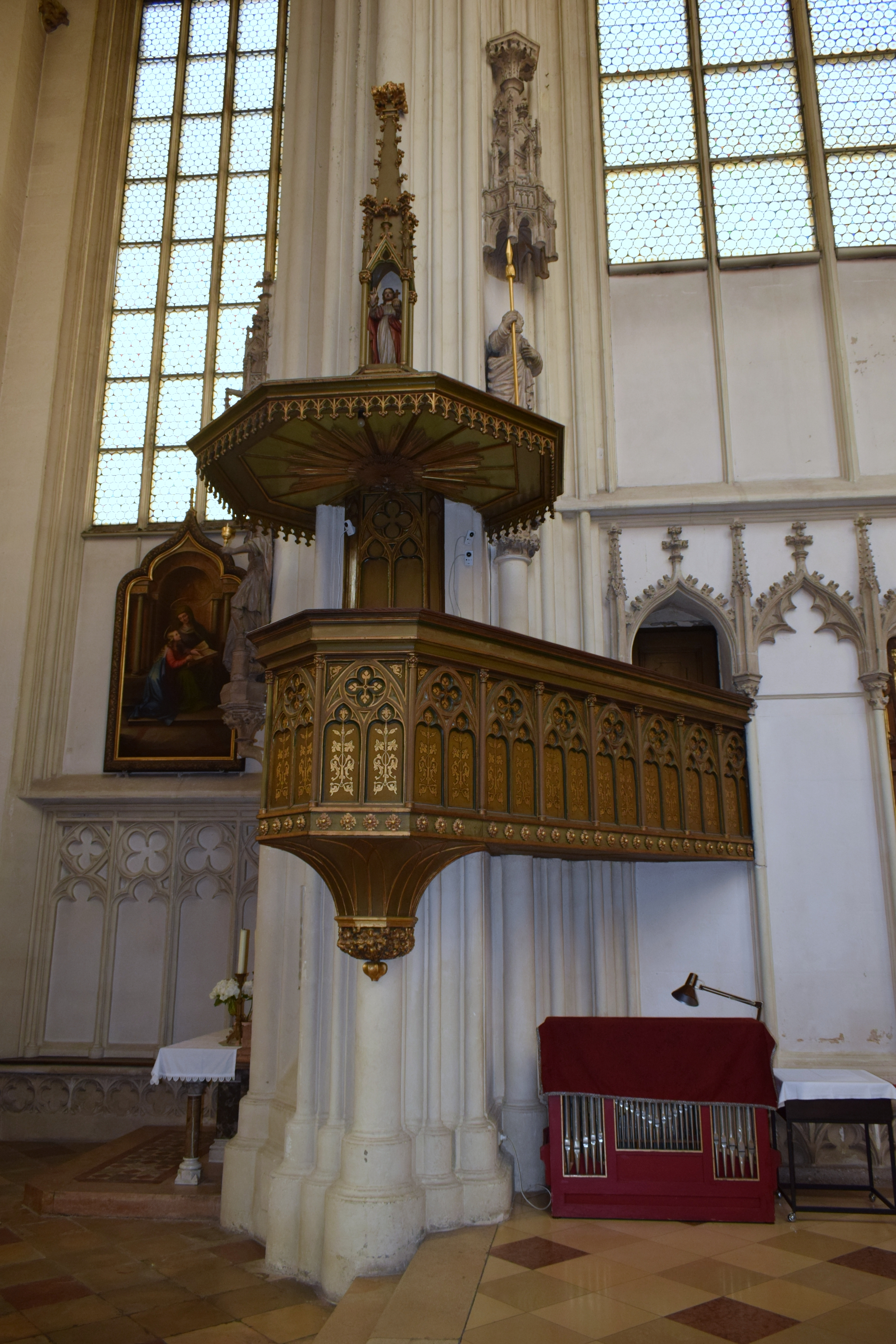
The pulpit
