= List of companies of Hungary =

Location of Hungary

Hungary is a unitary parliamentary republic in Central Europe. It covers an area of 93,030 square kilometres (35,920 sq mi), situated in the Carpathian Basin and bordered by Slovakia to the north, Romania to the east, Serbia to the south, Croatia to the southwest, Slovenia to the west, Austria to the northwest, and Ukraine to the northeast. With about 10 million inhabitants, Hungary is a medium-sized member state of the European Union. The official language is Hungarian, which is the most widely spoken non-Indo-European language in Europe. Hungary's capital and largest metropolis is Budapest, a significant economic hub, classified as an Alpha- global city. Major urban areas include Debrecen, Szeged, Miskolc, Pécs and Győr.

Hungary is a middle power and has the world's 57th largest economy by nominal GDP, as well as the 58th largest by PPP, out of 188 countries measured by the IMF. As a substantial actor in several industrial and technological sectors, it is both the world's 36th largest exporter and importer of goods. Hungary is a high-income economy with a very high level of human development. It has a social security and universal health care system, and a tuition-free university education.

For further information on the types of business entities in this country and their abbreviations, see "Business entities in Hungary".

== Notable firms ==
This list includes notable companies with primary headquarters located in the country. The industry and sector follow the Industry Classification Benchmark taxonomy. Organizations which have ceased operations are included and noted as defunct.

Notable companies Status: P=Private, S=State; A=Active, D=Defunct
Name	Industry	Sector	Headquarters	Founded	Notes	Status	
4iG	Telecommunications	Telecommunications Services	Budapest	1990	Telecommunications	P	A
Ajka Crystal	Consumer goods	Durable household products	Ajka	1878	Crystal glass manufacturer	P	A
ASL Airlines Hungary	Consumer services	Airlines	Budapest	1990	Airline, part of ASL Airlines Ireland	P	A
AstridBio	Health care	Biotechnology	Szeged	2003	Biotechnology, bioinformatics software	P	A
BKV Zrt.	Consumer services	Travel & tourism	Budapest	1968	Public transport	P	A
BorsodChem	Basic materials	Specialty chemicals	Budapest	1949	Chemicals	P	A
Budapest Aircraft Service	Consumer services	Airlines	Budapest	1991	Charter airline	P	A
CBA	Consumer services	Food retailers & wholesalers	Alsónémedi	1992	Supermarket chain	P	A
CIB Bank	Financials	Banks	Budapest	1979	Commercial bank	P	A
CIG Pannonia	Financials	Full line insurance	Budapest	2007	Insurance	P	A
Coop	Consumer services	Food retailers & wholesalers	Budapest	1995	Supermarket chain	P	A
Corvus Hungary	Industrials	Aerospace	Ballószög	2011	Aircraft	P	A
Csepel	Consumer goods	Automobiles	Szigetszentmiklós	1944	Vehicles, defunct 1996	P	D
Danubius Hotels Group	Consumer services	Hotels	Budapest	1972	International hotels	P	A
Diego	Consumer goods	Home improvement retailers	Dabas	1992	Retail	P	A
Fegyver- és Gépgyár	Industrials	Building materials & fixtures	Budapest	1891	HVAC, part of MPF Industry Group	P	A
Fornetti	Consumer goods	Food products	Kecskemét	1997	Food	P	A
Ganz Works	Consumer goods	Automobiles	Budapest	1844	Tramcars	P	A
Richter Gedeon Co.	Health care	Pharmaceuticals	Budapest	1901	Pharmaceuticals	P	A
Gepida	Consumer goods	Recreational products	Budapest	1993	Bicycles	P	A
Graphisoft	Technology	Software	Budapest	1982	Computer software development	P	A
Győri Keksz	Consumer goods	Food products	Győr	1880	Food	P	A
Herend Porcelain Manufactory	Consumer goods	Durable household products	Herend	1826	Porcelain manufacturer	P	A
Hollóháza Porcelain Manufactory	Consumer goods	Durable household products	Hollóháza	1777	Porcelain manufacturer	P	A
Hungarian National Bank	Financials	Banks	Budapest	1924	Central bank	S	A
Hungarian State Railways	Industrials	Railroads	Budapest	1869	National railways	S	A
Ikarus Bus	Industrials	Commercial vehicles & trucks	Budapest	1895	Bus manufacturer	P	A
K&H Bank	Financials	Banks	Budapest	1987	Commercial bank	P	A
Lehel	Consumer goods	Durable household products	Jászberény	1945	Appliances, defunct 1999, now part of Electrolux (Sweden)	P	D
MagNet Bank	Financials	Banks	Budapest	1995	Commercial bank	P	A
Magyar Posta	Industrials	Delivery services	Budapest	1867	Postal administration	S	A
Magyar Telekom	Telecommunications	Fixed line telecommunications	Budapest	1991	Telephone and internet, part of Deutsche Telekom (Germany)	P	A
MAL Hungarian Aluminium	Basic materials	Aluminum	Ajka	1995	Aluminum	P	A
Malév	Consumer services	Airlines	Budapest	1956	Airline, defunct 2012	P	D
MBH Bank	Financials	Banks	Budapest	2023	Commercial bank	P	A
MFS	Industrials	Defense	Sirok	1952	Ammunition	P	A
MOL Group	Oil & gas	Exploration & production	Budapest	1957	Petrol and gas	P	A
MTVA	Consumer services	Broadcasting & entertainment	Budapest	2011	National media provider	S	A
MVK Zrt.	Consumer services	Travel & tourism	Miskolc	1954	Public transport	P	A
MVM Group	Utilities	Conventional electricity	Budapest	1948	Power, electricity distribution	S	A
NNG	Technology	Software	Budapest	2004	Software	P	A
Oncotherm	Health care	Medical equipment	Budapest	1988	Medical devices	P	A
Opus Global	Industrials	Industrial holding	Budapest	1912	Industrial holding	P	A
Organica Technologies	Utilities	Water	Budapest	1998	Wastewater treatment plants construction	P	A
Orion Electronics	Industrials	Electronic equipment	Budapest	1913	Electronics	P	A
OrthoGraph	Technology	Software	Budapest	2004	Software	P	A
OTP Bank	Financials	Banks	Budapest	1949	Financial services	P	A
Pannon	Telecommunications	Mobile telecommunications	Törökbálint	1994	Telecommunications, part of Telenor (Norway)	P	A
Panrusgáz	Oil & gas	Exploration & production	Budapest	1994	Natural gas	P	A
Pick Szeged	Consumer goods	Food products	Szeged	1869	Cold cuts	P	A
Prezi	Technology	Software	Budapest	2009	Visual storytelling software development	P	A
Puli Space Technologies	Industrials	Aerospace	Budapest	2010	Space technology	P	A
Rába	Consumer goods	Automobiles	Győr	1896	Vehicles	P	A
Scarab Research	Technology	Software	Budapest	2009	Research	P	A
State Printing Company	Consumer services	Publishing	Budapest	1851	Printing	P	A
Tisza Cipő	Consumer goods	Clothing & accessories	Martfű	1942	Apparel	P	A
Törley	Consumer goods	Distillers & vintners	Budapest	1882	Champagne producer	P	A
Travel Service	Consumer services	Airlines	Budapest	2001	Airline	P	A
TriGránit	Financials	Real estate holding & development	Budapest	1997	Development	P	A
Tungsram	Industrials	Electrical components & equipment	Budapest	1896	Vacuum tubes, light bulbs	P	A
UPC Magyarország	Telecommunications	Fixed line telecommunications	Budapest	1998	Telecommunications, part of Liberty Global (USA)	P	A
Videoton	Consumer goods	Consumer electronics	Székesfehérvár	1938	Electric goods	P	A
VirusBuster	Technology	Computer services	Budapest	1997	Computer security	P	A
Vodafone Hungary	Telecommunications	Mobile telecommunications	Budapest	1999	Mobile, part of the Vodafone Group (UK)	P	A
Wizz Air	Consumer services	Airlines	Budapest	2003	Airline	P	A
Zsolnay	Consumer goods	Durable household products	Pécs	1853	Porcelain manufacturer	P	A
Zwack	Consumer goods	Distillers & vintners	Budapest	1840	Short drinks	P	A

== See also ==
- Economy of Hungary
