= K&H Bank =

Bank in Hungary

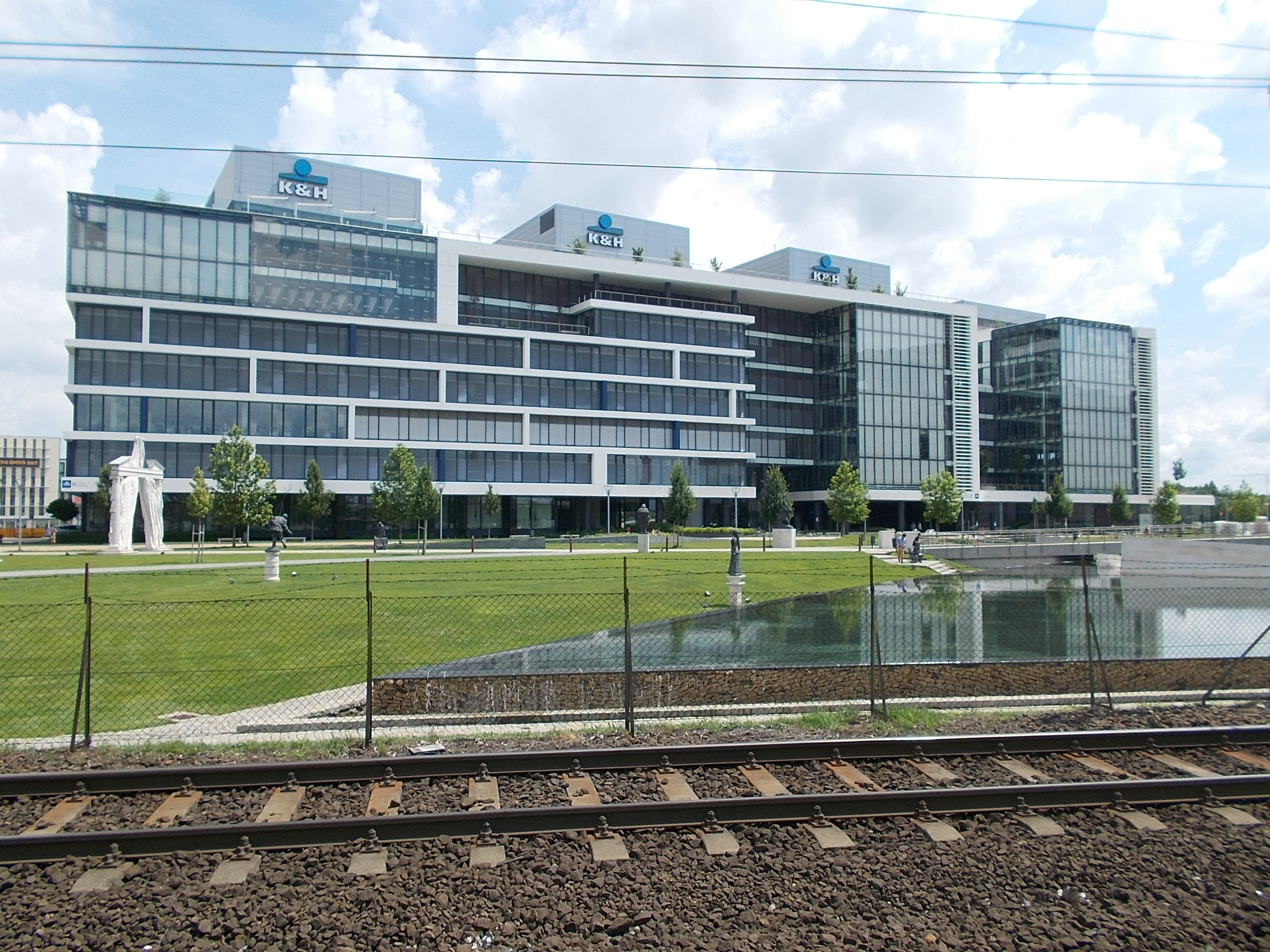
- K&H head office in Budapest
- Type: Public
- Industry: Financial Services
- Founded: 1987
- Headquarters: Budapest, Hungary
- Key people: Peter Roebben (CEO); Attila Gombás (Head of Finance Division); Lajos Beke (Head of CRO Services Division)
- Products: Banking and insurance
- Revenue: ▲HUF 680.551 billion (2025)
- Operating income: ▲HUF 162.210 billion (2025)
- Net income: ▲HUF 139.292 billion (2025)
- Total assets: ▲HUF 6,217.134 billion (2025)
- Total equity: ▲HUF 740.313 billion (2025)
- Number of employees: 3,354 (2025)
- Website: kh.hu

K&H Bank (Hungarian: Kereskedelmi és Hitelbank, lit. 'Commercial and Credit Bank') is one of the biggest commercial banks in Hungary, owned by the Brussels-based KBC Group since 1999.

== History ==
K&H was established as Országos Kereskedelmi és Hitelbank Rt. (OKHB, lit. 'National Commercial and Credit Bank') under the 1987 reform that established a two-tier banking system in Hungary, as one of the three main commercial banks spun off from the Hungarian National Bank together with Budapest Bank (BB) and Hungarian Credit Bank (MHB). The OKHB initially had a network of 47 local offices, the largest of the three. In 1993, it purchased IBUSZ Bank, which had been formed after the end of communism in Hungary from the IBUSZ network of travel agencies. In 1997 the bank, by then known as K&H, was privatised with support from the EBRD and purchased by a consortium of Belgium's Kredietbank and Irish Life. In 1999 Kredietbank's successor group KBC bought out shares from Irish Life and held 80 percent of K&H, raised to 100 percent in 2007. In 2001, K&H acquired MHB, which in 1996 had been acquired by ABN AMRO and merged with the latter's own Hungarian subsidiary created in 1993.

In 2021, Guy Libot, former Senior General Manager of Finance at KBC, was appointed CEO of K&H. He was replaced by Peter Roebben in December 2024. The bank had a revenue of 67.6 billion HUF in 2022, which was 10 % less than the year before.

== Operations ==
As of 2025, K&H had total assets of HUF 6,217 billion and a total of 190 branches in Hungary. It offers a full range of financial products, including conventional products: account management, investments, savings, loans, bank guarantees, bank card services, custody management, treasury, project financing, Private Banking services as well as investment fund management, leasing, securities trading, factoring, life and pension insurance. These latter services are offered through subsidiaries.

By the end of 2021, K&H announced that it will have achieved carbon neutrality, with plans to reduce its carbon emissions to 80 percent by 2030 compared to 2015.

The company has been the official jersery sponsor of the Hungarian national basketball team.

== See also ==
- OTP Bank
- MKB Bank
- CIB Bank
- List of banks in Hungary
