= Crédit Foncier de France hostage crisis =

1997 labor standoff

The Crédit Foncier de France hostage crisis, was a labor-related standoff in January 1997 involving the occupation of the headquarters of the French bank Crédit Foncier de France and its high-ranking executives by bank employees to protest government-led restructuring plans that threatened hundreds of jobs.

== Background ==
Although Crédit Foncier de France is a private bank, the French government appoints high-ranking members as the bank issues subsidized loans. This includes the governor, who at the time was Jérôme Meyssonnier.

In 1995, the bank reported a loss of 10.8 billion francs, and in 1996, the French government gave Credit Foncier a bailout to prevent it from collapsing, fearing the resulting financial downturn. After the bailout, the French government began planning to dissolve the bank, with Finance Minister Jean Arthuis seeking to sell its core housing loans businesses to Credit Immobilier et Hotelier (CIB) and wind down all other operations. Initial estimates stated that at least 900 of Credit Foncier's 3,300 employees to be laid off, but this was later revised upwards to around 1,500 layoffs.

== Events ==
On January 17, more than a thousand employees at Credit Foncier de France occupied the company's headquarters in Paris. Three days later, Prime Minister Alain Juppé appointed a mediator to try to resolve the conflict. The same day, Meyssonnier announced that he would propose a joint venture to save the bank, which union leaders hailed as "a step in the right direction". On January 22, the employees released Meyssonnier and seven other senior executives, ending the crisis, although labor organizers stated their interest to continue occupying the headquarters until the government scrapped their plans.

== Aftermath ==
Adam Gopnik, writing for The New Yorker, noted that Meyssonnier had "curiously [sic] become a kind of hero to the very people who were keeping him locked up."
