= Organica =

Organica may refer to:

== Business ==
- Organica Technologies, a Hungarian wastewater treatment company
- Organica (ko), a South Korean food company, a subsidiary of the Herald Corporation
- Organica, a speciality chemicals company in Wolfen, Germany

== Entertainment ==
- Organica: Solo Saxophones, Volume 2, a 2011 album by David S. Ware
- Organica, a 2002 album by David Celia
- Organica, a 1999 album by Kill Switch...Klick
- Organica, a multi-media concert and album series created by Christoph Bull
