= MBH Bank =

Bank in Budapest, Hungary

MBH Bank Plc.

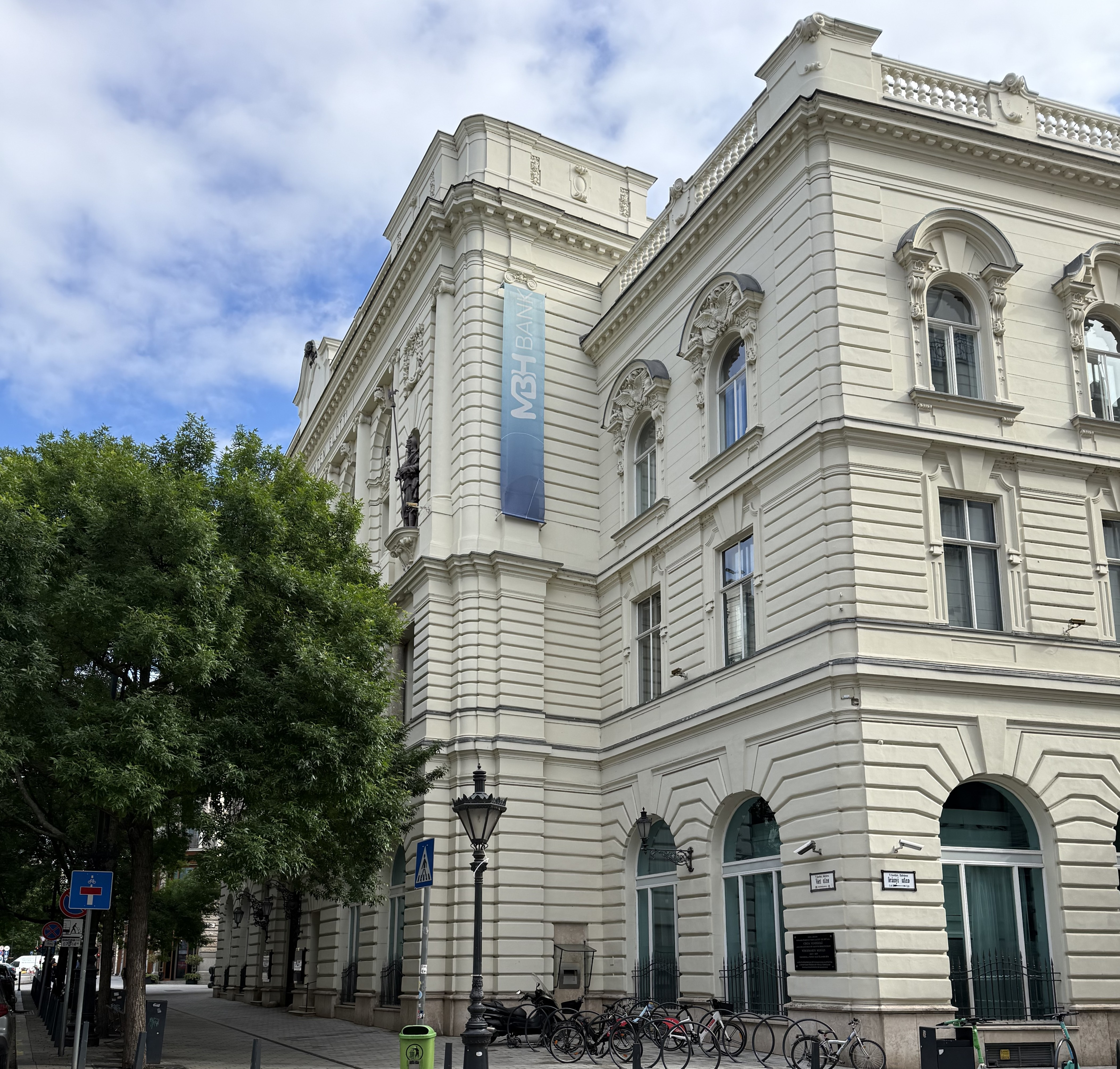
- Head office of MBH Bank at Váci utca 38 in Budapest
- Native name: MBH Bank Public Limited Company
- Type: Public
- Industry: Banking, Financial services
- Predecessor: Merger of MKB Bank, Takarékbank and Budapest Bank
- Founded: May 1, 2023; 3 years ago
- Headquarters: Budapest, Hungary
- Key people: Zsolt Barna (Chairman & CEO)
- Net income: ▼HUF 165.109 billion (2025)
- Total assets: ▲HUF 12,890.268 billion (2025)
- Total equity: ▲HUF 1,261.181 billion (2025)
- Website: https://www.mbhbank.com/

MBH Bank Plc. is a Hungarian bank. It began operations on 1 May 2023 following the merger of MKB Bank Plc., Takarékbank Ltd. and Budapest Bank Ltd. This triple merger was a unique transaction in the Hungarian domestic banking sector, resulting in the largest Hungarian-owned banking institution as measured by assets and clients. The merger was also characterised by the strong involvement of the Orbán government as well as oligarchs close to Orban (including Lőrinc Mészáros).

Zsolt Barna was appointed as the CEO of Magyar Bankholding, a domestically owned financial holding company created to facilitate the merger, in 2020. He has been leading the integration and strategic alignment of the three banks, creating one of Hungary’s largest banking groups. His leadership focuses on modernization and strengthening the group’s position in the financial sector.

MBH Bank has been a market leader in several areas since its inception, including corporate lending, particularly to micro, small, and medium-sized enterprises, the leasing market, and the agricultural and food industries. MBH Bank has the largest branch network in Hungary, with 400 locations available for in-person customer service. Through its role in the banking sector, MBH Bank creates significant value for the national economy, supporting Hungarian businesses and the retail customers from its position as a "national champion".

MBH Bank currently serves approximately 2.5 million retail and corporate customers. Its total assets exceeds more than HUF 12,8 trillion, making it Hungary’s second largest bank. Deposits at the bank amount to more than HUF 8 trillion, while the gross loan portfolio is over HUF 6,1 trillion.

== The formation of the MBH Investment Bank ==
The MBH Investment Bank was formed to provide investment services within the MBH Group. It has a decades-long history, previously operating under the name MTB Magyar Takarékszövetkezeti Bank Zrt. until May 1, 2023. The name change reflects the renewed business strategy, aiming to offer a highly diversified portfolio of investment products with expertise across various asset classes, all through a unified "one-stop-shop" approach.

As a result, the domestic banking system gained another Hungarian-owned player, further increasing competition in the market. MBH Bank sells its portfolio of investment products uniformly through the established company. MBH Investment Bank also acts as a knowledge hub, combining the expertise and experience of MBH Bank, MBH Fund Management, MBH Investment Bank, and the Investment Analysis Centre.

Key balance sheet data and results (HUF million)

| Description | Year 2022 | Year 2023 | Year 2024 |
|---|---|---|---|
| Balance sheet total | 10 614 422 | 11 107 048 | 12 504 700 |
| Subscribed capital | 321 699 | 322 530 | 322 530 |
| Equity | 808 736 | 1 023 371 | 1 139 500 |
| Profit before tax | 103 390 | 221 876 | 277 000 |

In 2022, Magyar Bankholding announced that it had selected Thought Machine, the London-based central banking technology company, to launch its next-generation digital bank. The banking group has established a foundation to implement this project, aiming to create a modern digital bank for Hungarians. This foundation is using Thought Machine’s core banking platform, Vault Core, to power the new digital bank and introduce a full range of new digital, retail-first products and services that will enable customers to save, pay and borrow conveniently.

== Stock exchange listing ==
MBH Bank Plc. has been listed on the Budapest Stock Exchange since May 2019, when MKB Bank Plc., which was renamed to MBH Bank in the triple merger, was first listed. The largest shareholder with almost half of the shares is Lőrinc Mészáros. The state-owned Corvinus BHG Zrt. holds 15 % of the bank.

MBH Bank Plc. has held several bond issuances since its 2023.

On January 21, 2025, MBH Bank Plc. saw strong investor interest in its new international MREL-eligible bond. More than EUR 1.6 billion was offered by investors, which amounts to more than three times the minimum target set at launch. Based on the bids received, the credit institution decided to issue bonds with a total nominal value of EUR 750 million, making it the largest MREL-eligible bond transaction ever undertaken by a Hungarian issuer.

Credit rating of MBH Bank Plc. (Moody’s)
| Rating category | Rating achieved |
| Long Term Deposit Ratings | Baa3 (stable outlook) |
| Short Term Deposit Ratings | P-3 |
| Long Term Counterparty Risk Rating | Baa2 |
| Short Term Counterparty Risk Rating | P-2 |
| Adjusted / Baseline Credit Assessment (BCA) | ba3 |
| Senior Unsecured Programme Rating | (P)Ba2 |
| Senior Unsecured Bond Rating | Ba2 |

== Management ==
Board of directors:

- Zsolt Barna - Chairman and CEO
- Levente Szabó - Deputy CEO for individual business services
- Ádám Egerszegi – Deputy CEO for digitalization and operations
- Marcell Takács
- Attila Tajthy
- Koppány Lélfai

== MBH Group ==
- (MBH) Duna Takarék Bank
- MBH Investment Bank
- Euroleasing
- MBH Asset Management
- MBH Mortgage Bank
- Fundamenta

== Awards ==
VISA Awards 2023

- Visa #1 Issuer Award 2023
- Visa #1 Special Award 2023

ESG Awards 2023

- Employee Engagement ESG Programme Of The Year

EXIM Awards 2024

- Bank of the Year 2023
- Most Successful Green Refinancing Partner 2023
- Most Active Leasing Company 2023

FocusEconomics Analyst Forecast Awards 2024

- #1 Forecaster - Hungary Interest Rate
- #1 Forecaster - Hungary Exchange Rate
- #1 Forecaster - Hungary Inflation

Top Employers Institute 2024

- Top Employer 2024

Euromoney Global Private Banking Awards 2024

- Hungary's Best for High-Net-Worth
- Hungary's Best for Discretionary Portfolio Management

Euromoney Global Private Banking Awards 2025

- Hungary’s Best for Succession Planning
- Hungary’s Best for Discretionary Portfolio Management

== Sustainability and corporate responsibility ==
MBH Bank has set strategic objectives to create infrastructure, products and services for both retail and corporate clients that will help them to achieve their own sustainability and climate goals.

MBH Bank is a responsible partner in Green Finance, helping in areas such as waste and water management, energy consumption, energy efficiency and also areas of other projects with environmental impacts.

At the Budapest Climate Summit 2023 international conference, the financial institution announced its comprehensive ESG program “Sustainable Future Bank”. The programme spans several years and aims to protect natural habitats and animal species and to achieve Hungary’s climate goals.

To support biodiversity, the bank entered into cooperation with the Ministry of Agriculture and launched a joint program with Hungary’s 10 national parks to protect the country’s green habitats and wildlife. Through this collaboration, MBH bank is providing HUF 30 million in support to the National Parks. As part of MBH’s forest and tree planting campaigns, 13,000 native tree seedlings were planted last year with the involvement of the bank’s employees.

MBH Bank developed a generational diversity program that won several professional HR awards.

MBH Bank’s social responsibility program covers a broad spectrum of initiatives. The bank’s priority causes include supporting the socially disadvantaged through inclusion, education and the development of financial awareness and digital literacy, as well as supporting Hungarian art and culture (Hungarian Art and Business).

== See also ==
- List of banks in Hungary
