= List of banks in Hungary =

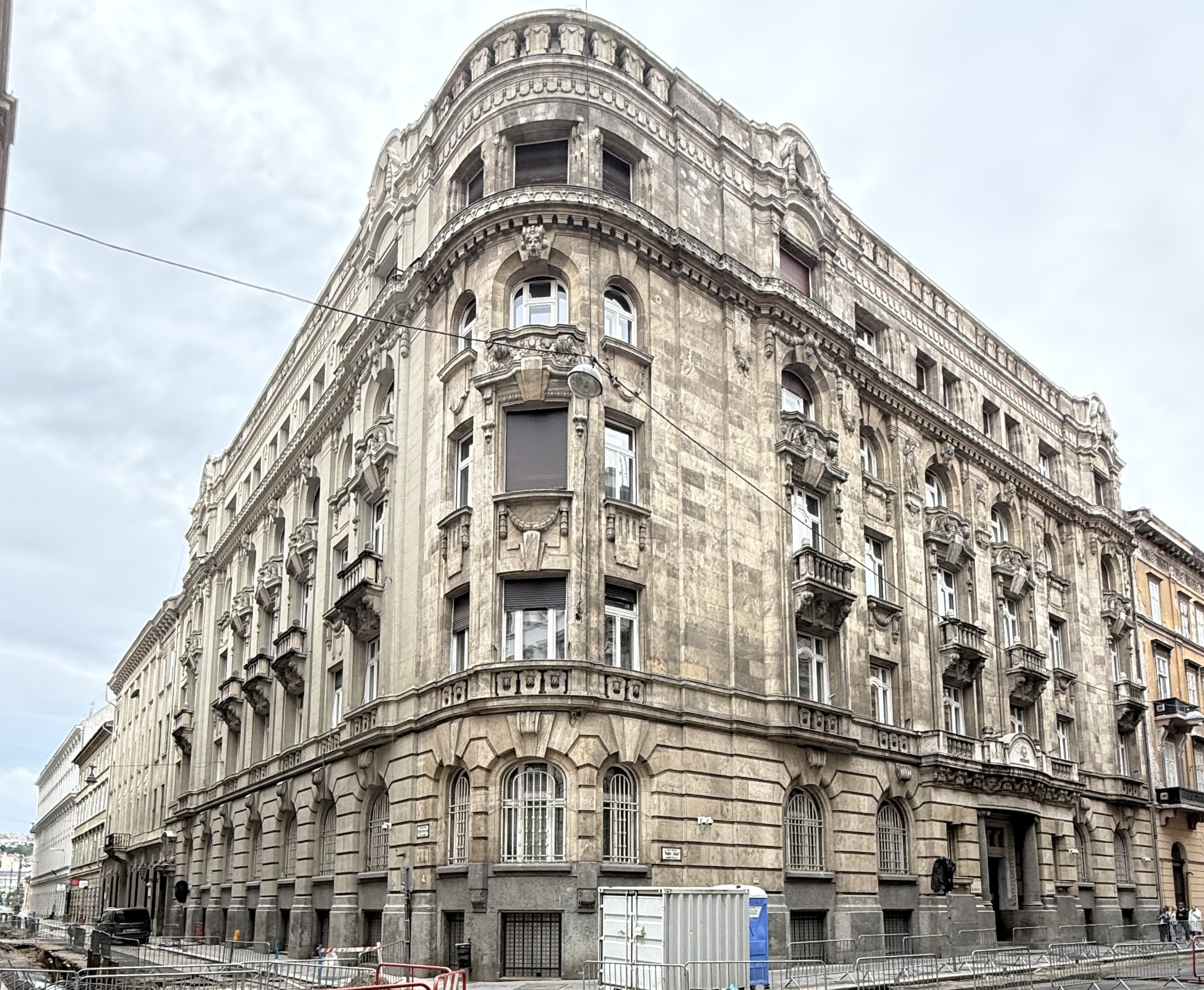
OTP Bank head office, Budapest

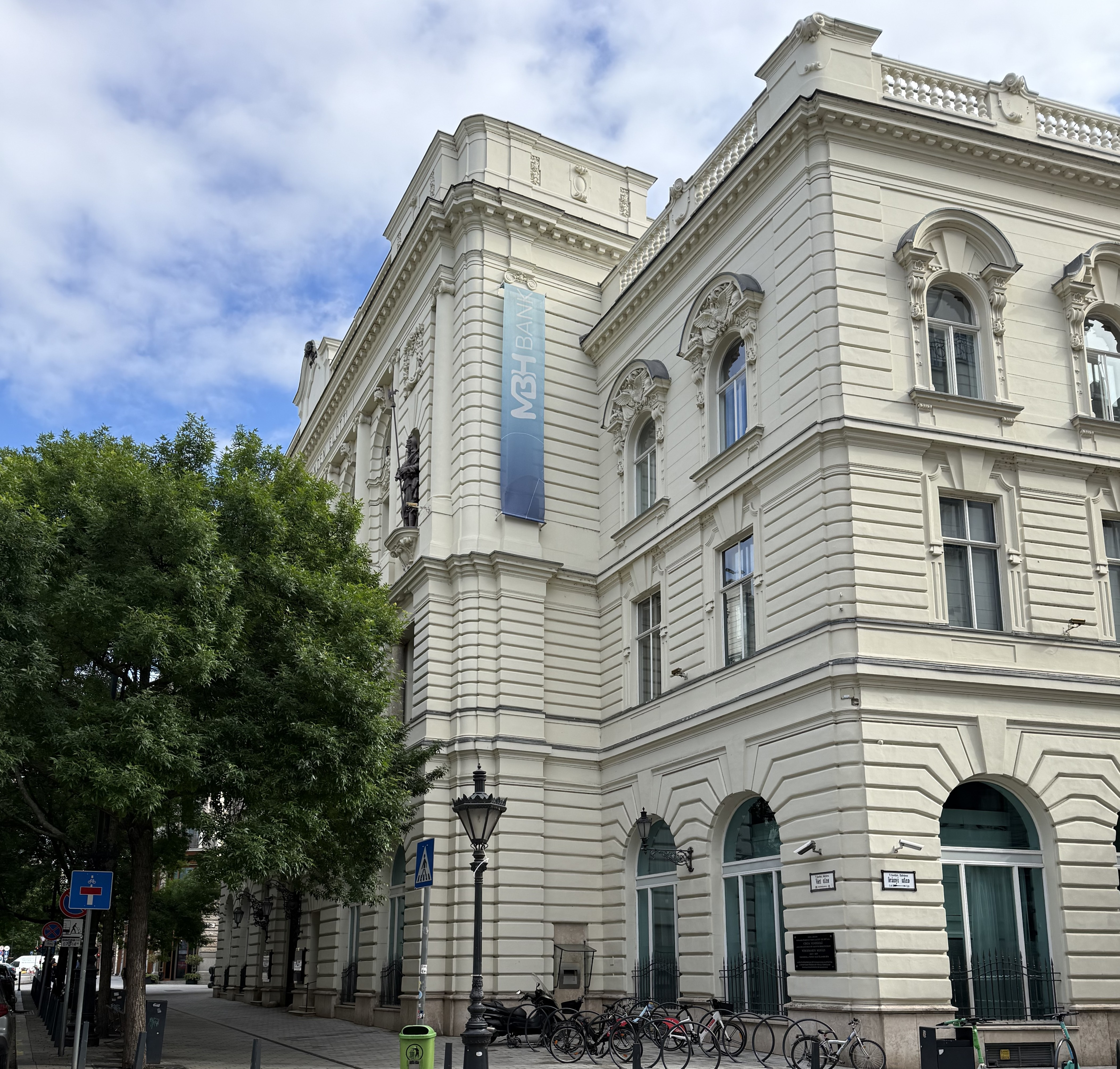
MHB Bank head office, Budapest

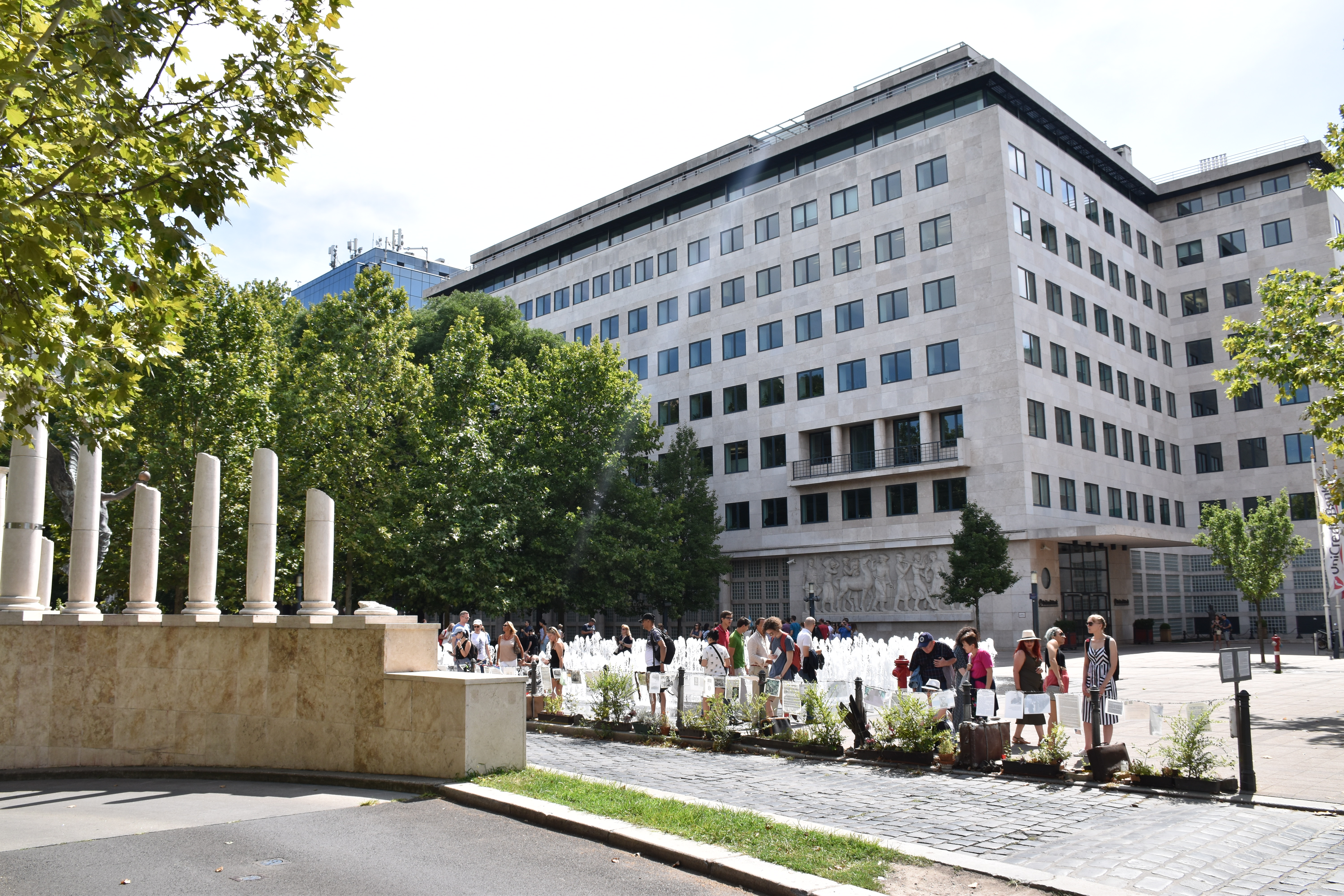
UniCredit Bank Hungary head office, Budapest

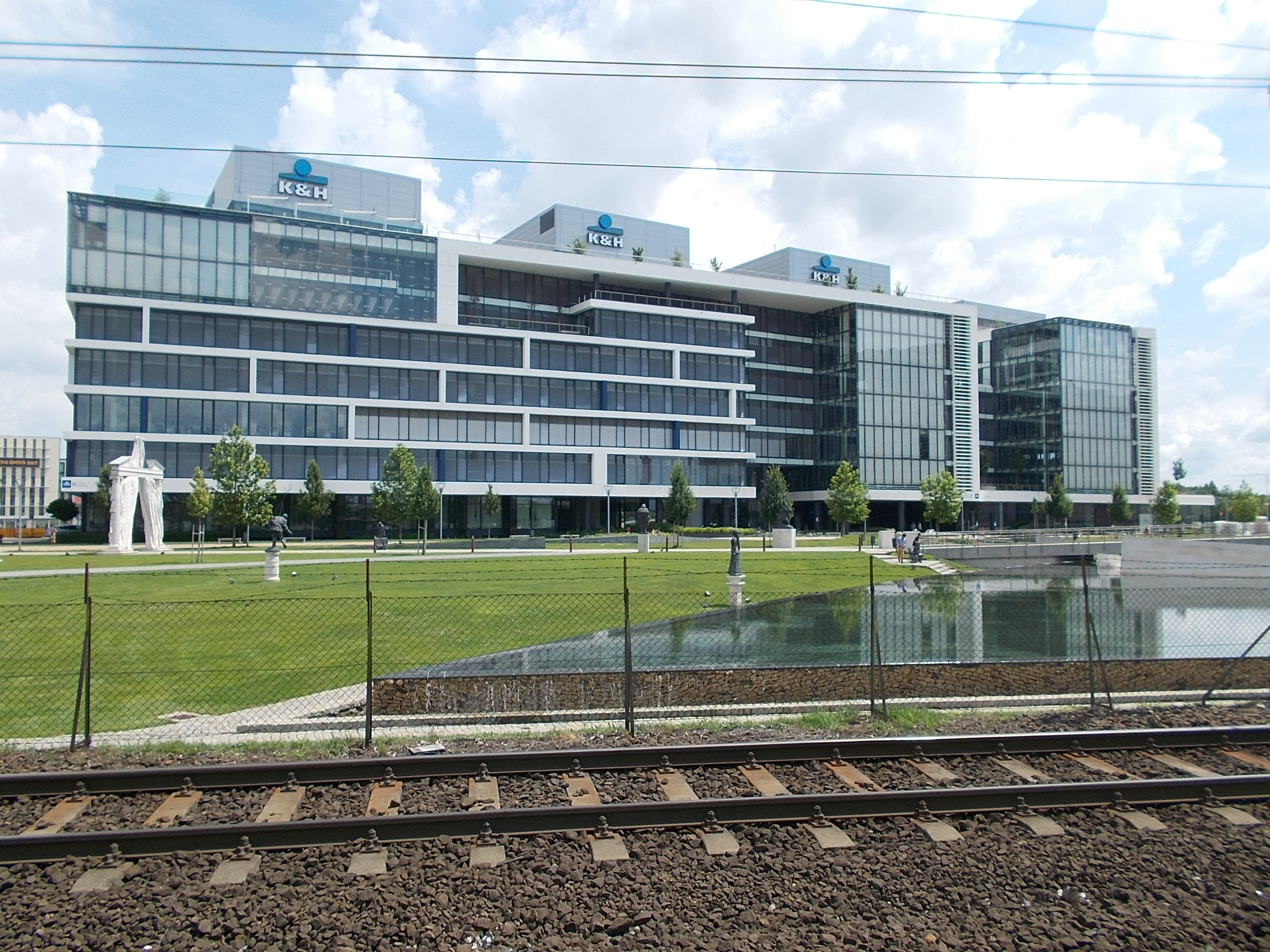
K&H Bank head office, Budapest

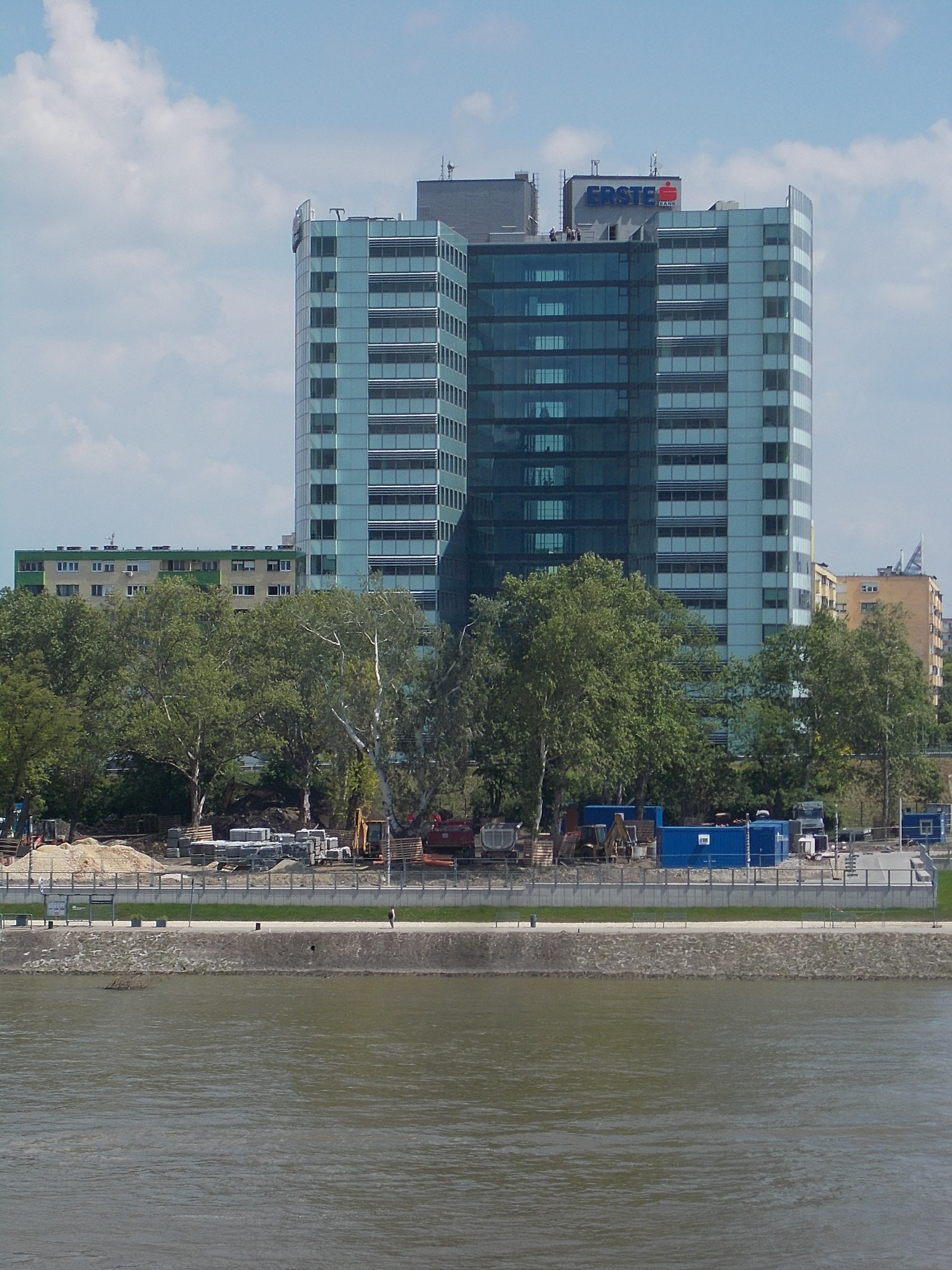
Erste Bank Hungary head office, Budapest

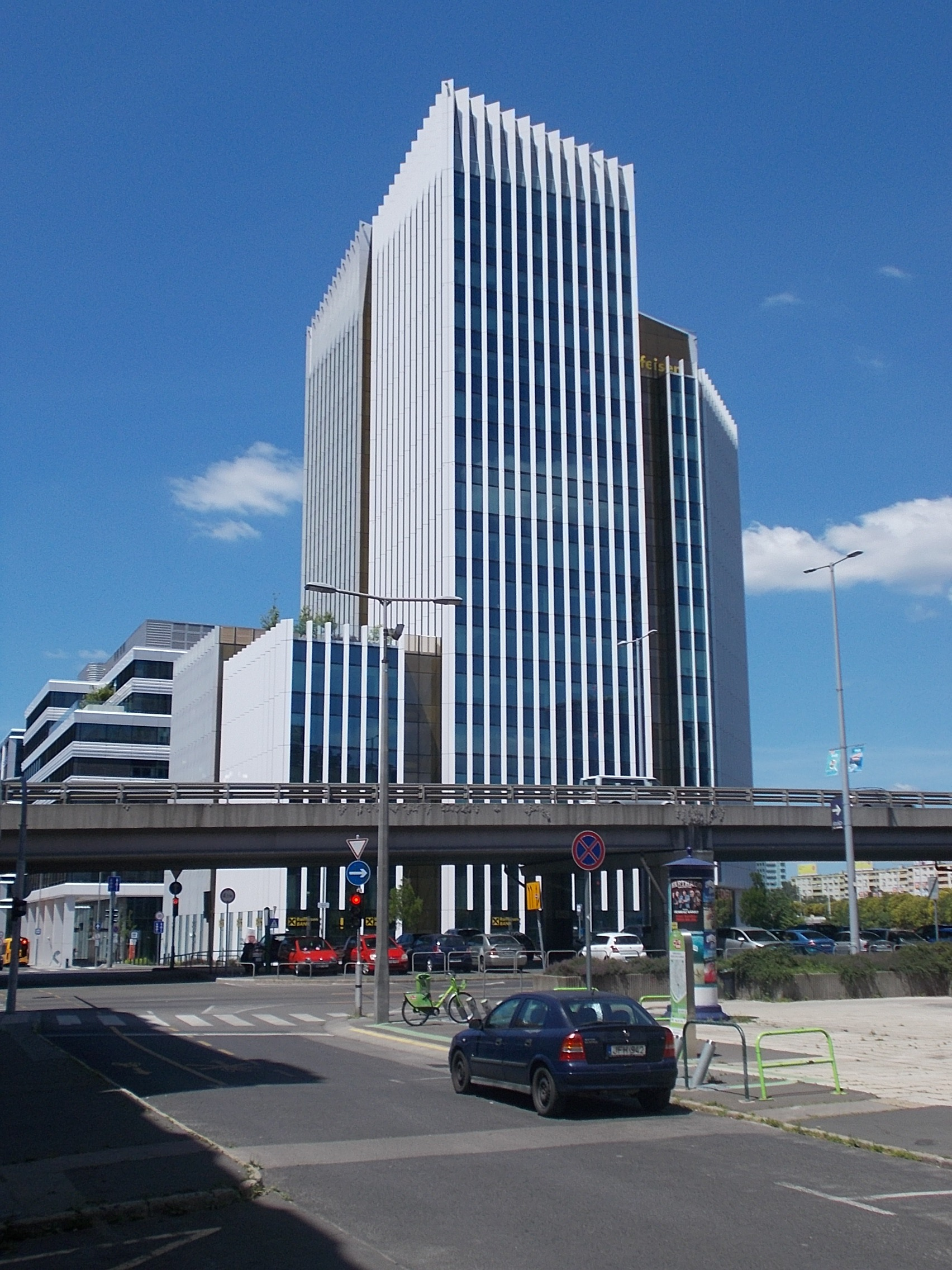
Agora building in Budapest, head office of Raiffeisen Hungary

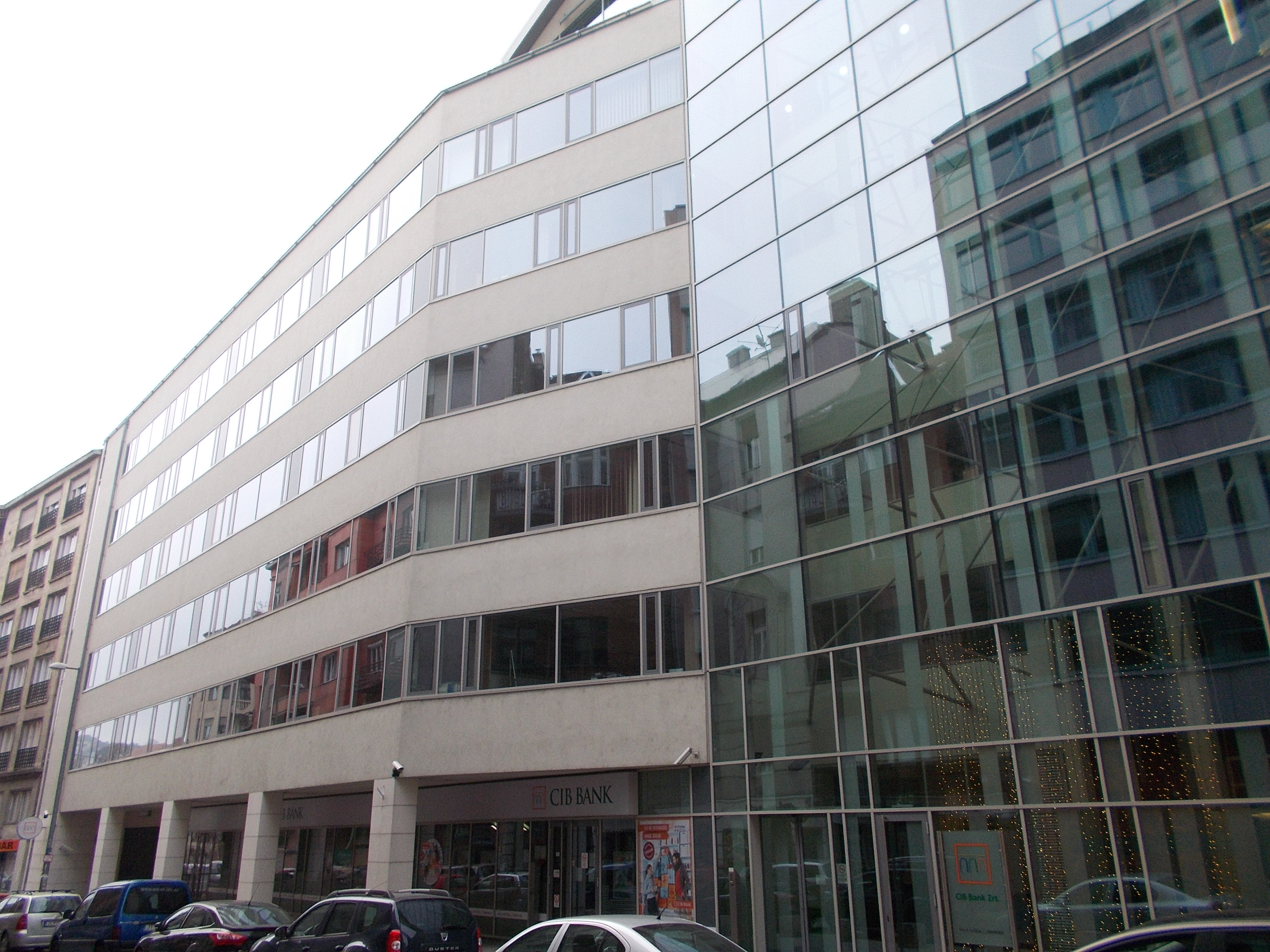
CIB Bank head office, Budapest

The following list of banks in Hungary is to be understood within the framework of the European single market, which means that Hungary's banking system is more open to cross-border banking operations than peers outside of the European Union.

The Hungarian National Bank (MNB) is the country's banking supervisor.

== Systemically important banks ==
As of 2025, the following Hungarian banks were designated as systemically important, listed here by decreasing score of systemic importance:

- OTP Bank Nyrt
- MBH Bank Nyrt
- UniCredit Bank Hungary Zrt, subsidiary of UniCredit (Italy)
- Kereskedelmi és Hitelbank Zrt (K&H Bank), subsidiary of KBC Group (Belgium)
- Erste Bank Hungary Zrt, subsidiary of Erste Group (Austria)
- Raiffeisen Bank Zrt, subsidiary of Raiffeisen Bank International (Austria)
- CIB Bank Zrt, subsidiary of Intesa Sanpaolo (Italy)

== Other commercial banks ==
As of March 2026, other commercial banks licensed by the MNB included:

- Bank of China (CEE) Zrt, subsidiary of Bank of China
- Cofidis Bank Hungary, subsidiary of Cofidis (France)
- Granit Bank Nyrt, subsidiary of BDPST Group
- KDB Bank Europa Zrt, subsidiary of Korea Development Bank (South Korea)
- MagNet Magyar Közösségi Bank Zrt, an ethical cooperative bank
- MBH Investment Bank Zrt, subsidiary of MBH Bank
- MBH DUNA Bank Zrt, subsidiary of MBH Bank
- Merkantil Váltó és Vagyonbefektető Bank Zrt (Merkantil Bank), a specialized lending and leasing subsidiary of the OTP Group
- Polgári Bank Zrt, absorbed by MagNet Bank in 2026
- Trive Bank Europe Zrt, subsidiary of Trive Financial Holding (Netherlands)

== Foreign branches ==
=== EEA branches ===
Also as of 14 March 2026, the following credit institutions established in the European Economic Area (EEA) operated a branch in Hungary:

- (France) BNP Paribas
- (Luxembourg) China Construction Bank (Europe) SA, subsidiary of CCB
- (Republic of Ireland) Citibank Europe plc, subsidiary of Citigroup (United States)
- (France) Cofidis, subsidiary of BNP Paribas
- (Germany) Deutsche Bank AG
- (Austria) Hypo-Bank Burgenland AG
- (Netherlands) ING Bank NV
- (Austria) Oberbank AG
- (Lithuania) Revolut Bank UAB, subsidiary of Revolut (United Kingdom)

=== Third-country branches ===
As of 13 October 2025, one bank established outside the EEA had a branch in Hungary ("third-country branch" in EU parlance):

- Bank of China

== Other banks ==
The state-owned Hungarian Development Bank and EXIM Magyarország are exempted from the EU Capital Requirements Directives.

== Defunct Banks ==
=== Banks formerly headquartered on the territory of present-day Hungary ===
- First National Savings Bank of Pest (1839-1948)
- Hungarian Commercial Bank of Pest (1840-1950)
- Szeged-Csongrád Savings Bank (1845-1948)
- Hungarian General Credit Bank (1867-1948)
- Hungarian Discount and Exchange Bank (1869-1949)
- Hungarian Mortgage Credit Bank (1869-1949)
- Hungarian Postal Savings Bank (1886-1948)
- Hungarian Industrial and Commercial Bank (1890-1902)
- Hazai Bank (1892-1946)
- Hungarian-Italian Bank (1920-1948)
- MKB Bank (1950-2023)
- Kinizsi Bank (1958-2019)
- Inter-Európa Bank (1985-2008)
- Budapest Bank (1987-2022)
- Sberbank Hungary (1987-2022)
- Postabank (1988-2004)
- Takarékbank (1989-2023)
- Ybl Bank (1989-1992)
- NHB Bank (1990-2019)
- FHB Mortgage Bank (1997-2016)
- Széchenyi Commercial Bank (2008-2014)
- International Investment Bank (2019-2023)

=== Other banks formerly headquartered in the Kingdom of Hungary ===
- Cluj-Napoca Savings Bank (1825-1948)
- First Croatian Savings Bank (1846-1945)
- Croatian Discount Bank (1868-1945)
- Tatra Banka (1884-1948)
- Serbian Bank in Zagreb (1895-1945)
- Kroatische Landesbank (1909-1945)
- City Savings Bank of Zagreb (1913-1952)

== See also ==
- Hungarian economy
- List of Hungarian companies
- List of banks in Europe
