= MKB Bank =

State-controlled bank in Hungary

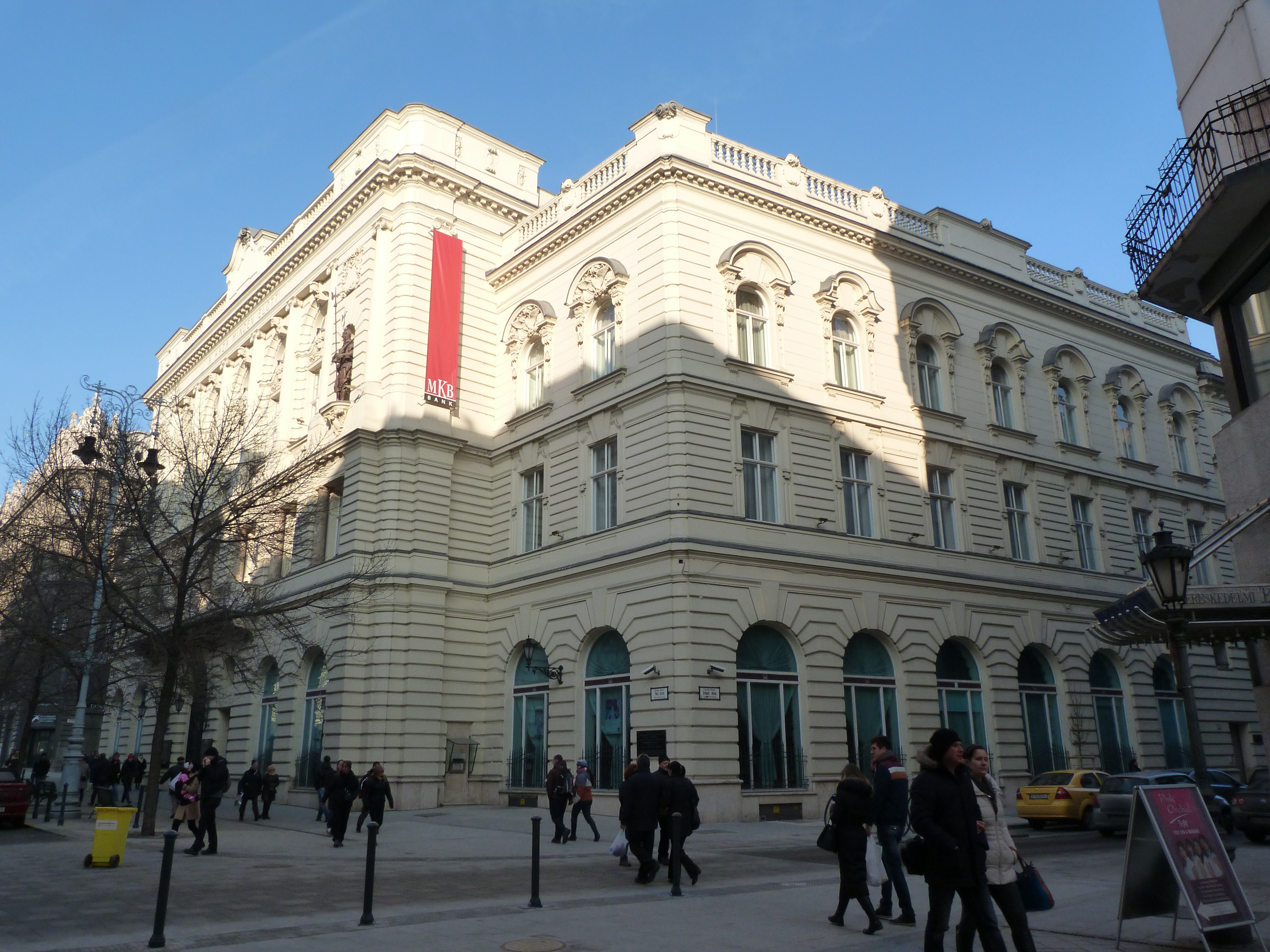
- Head office at Váci utca 38, Budapest
- Type: Public
- Industry: Finance and Insurance
- Founded: 1950
- Defunct: 2023
- Successor: MBH Bank
- Headquarters: Budapest, Hungary
- Products: Commercial banking,
- Website: www.mkbbank.hu

MKB Bank, initially Magyar Külkereskedelmi Bank (lit. 'Hungarian Foreign Trade Bank'), was a Hungarian state-owned bank founded in 1950. It was privatized in the mid-1990s, then renationalized in the 2010s. It eventually merged in the early 2020s with Budapest Bank and Takarékbank to form Magyar Bank Holding, branded MBH Bank, thus creating the second-largest commercial bank in Hungary behind OTP Bank. The complex three-way merger was announced in 2020 and completed in 2023.

== History ==
MKB was created in 1950 within the communist-era single-tier banking system, in which it was one of the country's four main financial institutions alongside the Hungarian National Bank, the Hungarian Investment Bank (renamed the State Bank for Development in 1972 and liquidated in 1987), and the Hungarian National Savings Bank Company. It took over assets and operations, among others, from the former Hungarian Commercial Bank of Pest. The purpose of its establishment was to participate in the international monetary system and manage financial transactions related to foreign trade.

In 1987 Hungary reformed its banking system. MKB received full operational license to service the general population. It was the first of the top five state-owned banks to be privatized, in 1994-1995 when BayernLB acquired a 25 percent stake, subsequently raised in stages until the mid-2000s.

In 2012, having received state aid in Germany, BayernLB agreed with the European Commission that it would divest its ownership of MKB. The deadline for divestiture was set at end-2016. The Hungarian government determined that the bank was in financial distress and took control of it in 2014.

In 2015 the National Bank of Hungary (NBH) bought MKB for €55 million. At the time it was the country's sixth-largest lender by assets.

In 2016, NBH sold MKB to a consortium of domestic and foreign equity funds. METIS Private Capital Fund would buy 45%, Blue Robin Investments SCA, a group of Indian and Chinese private investors, would buy 45%, and Budapest-based Pannonia Pension Fund would buy 10% of the allotted capital.

In January 2019, 81.5% of MKB shares were purchased by Lőrinc Mészáros and László Szíjj.

In May 2020, it was announced that Budapest Bank and Takarékbank would merge with MKB under the common entity Magyar Bankholding (MBH).

In February 2022 MKB agreed to represent the portfolio of CIG Pannonia to their clients.

In 2022, MKB absorbed Budapest Bank on March 31, and in August 2022 took over the Hungarian loan portfolio of Sberbank. The merger with Takarékbank was finalized on 30 April 2023.

== Political ties ==
MKB Bank has financed by loan the campaign of French presidential candidate Marine Le Pen. The asset declarations of France's presidential candidates reveal that she received some EUR 10.7 million in total. Major share of the bank is owned by a Hungarian oligarch Lőrinc Mészáros, with close ties to Viktor Orbán.

== See also ==
- OTP Bank
- K&H Bank
- CIB Bank
- List of banks in Hungary
- MKB Unionbank
