= Lőrinc Mészáros =

Hungarian oligarch and former politician

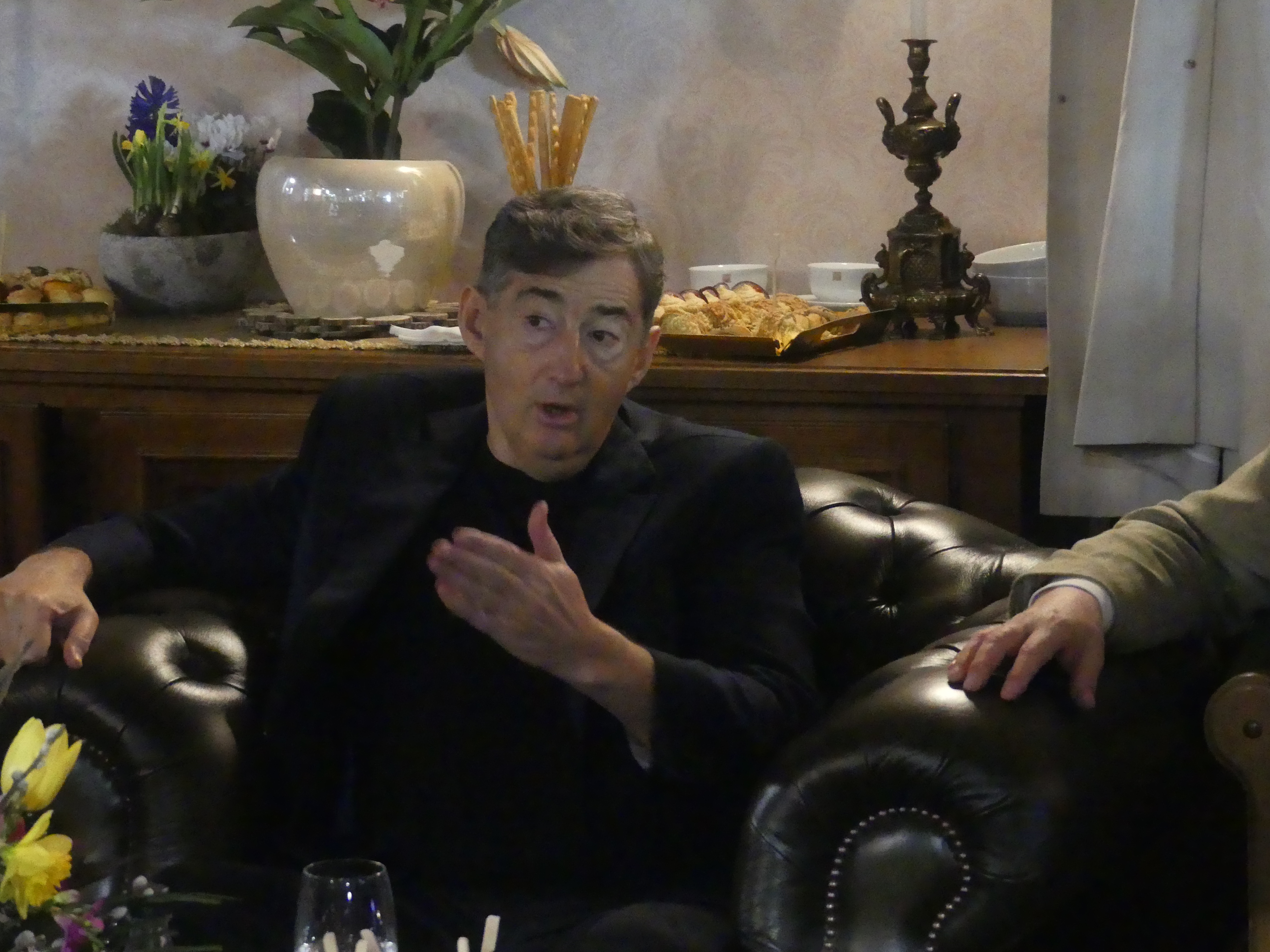

Mayor of Felcsút
- In office 19 June 2011 – 16 September 2018
- Preceded by: György Varga
- Succeeded by: László István Mészáros

Personal details
- Born: 24 February 1966 (age 60) Székesfehérvár, Hungary
- Party: Fidesz (2010–present)
- Nickname: Orban's wallet The plumber of the nation Pénztáros Lőrinc ("cashier" Lőrinc)

Lőrinc Mészáros (Note: Hungarian pronunciation: [ˈløːrint͡s ˈmeːsaːroʃ]) (born 24 February 1966) is a Hungarian billionaire businessman and former politician who was mayor of the village of Felcsút from 2011 to 2018. With an estimated wealth of 1,749 billion forints (US$5.8 billion) as of 2025, he is the richest person in Hungary. Several media outlets refer to him as an "oligarch".

Due to the perception that he owes his extreme wealth to his close ties to Fidesz and its leader Viktor Orbán, with whom he was childhood friends, Mészáros is one of the most controversial subjects of contemporary Hungarian social and political discourse. Since the 2010 Hungarian parliamentary election, in which Fidesz won a parliamentary supermajority sparking the Orbán era, Mészáros's wealth doubled annually and is regularly identified as Orbán's strawman. Mészáros acknowledged the significance of his relationship with Orbán, saying in 2017 that "[his] fortune is thanks to three factors: God, luck, and Viktor Orbán."

== Early life and business ==
Mészáros was born in Székesfehérvár on 24 February 1966. Like Orbán, he grew up in Felcsút, where they were childhood friends. He started his career there as a gas-fitter in the early 1990s. The company started to develop and secured important contracts in nearby settlements, working in residential parks and larger buildings. In the middle of the 2000s, however, the company began to receive fewer orders and lost most of its market share. By 2007, the company was operating at a loss.

Since Orbán's 2010 return to power, Mészáros has rapidly accumulated wealth. By 2013 he became the 88th richest Hungarian with 6.9 billion Ft assets, rising to 23.8 billion in 2016, and to 120 billion by 2017, making him the fifth-wealthiest Hungarian. According to a report by RTL Klub, in 2016 Mészáros's companies had, as a whole, a total public procurement revenue of 225 billion Ft.

== Politics ==
Mészáros won the local elections in Felcsút in 2011 representing the governing Fidesz–KDNP. After his election, Felcsút saw fast development, with several large state and EU funded projects (football stadium, touristic light railway, artificial lake) being realized. Mészáros also became president of the Felcsút New Generation Training Foundation, which was founded earlier by Orbán. The fortunes of Mészáros and its family companies continued to grow in 2018, winning public procurements worth of HUF259 billion, 93% of which came from the European Union. In April 2018, Mészáros retired as the Mayor of Felcsút "to solely concentrate on his economic interests".

== Later business ==
By May 2018, his and his wife's Konzum Private Equity Fund had traded at 280–300 billion Forint, making Mészáros the second richest man in the country. By March 2019 he became the 2057th wealthiest man on the planet according to Forbes. In the years between 2010 and 2019, he acquired several hotels and the second largest power plant of Hungary (Mátra Power Plant, providing about 15% of the country's electricity). He also acquired several radio stations, newspaper publishers, and the nationwide television channel Echo. These became part of his holding company, Opimus (later Opus Global Nyrt.), which grew into Hungary's biggest media empire.

In 2017, together with his longtime business partner László Szíjj, they acquired 81.5% of the Hungarian Foreign Trade Bank (MKB), the fourth-biggest commercial bank in Hungary. His name is associated with CIG Pannonia. His construction companies won bids in the two largest (state funded) infrastructure projects of the last five decades: the Paks-2 Nuclear Power Plant construction and the Budapest-Belgrade railway. Atlatszo.hu, an opposition news site, compiled a list of all of his companies.

Year	Wealth (billion HUF)	Notable events
2013	6.9	
2014	7.7	
2015	8.4	The "G-day": Viktor Orbán cuts ties with Lajos Simicska, former economic ally.
2016	23.8	Purchase of Mediaworks Hungary and Echo TV.
2017	120.0	Purchase of 49% share in the MKB Bank. Purchases in tourism and wineries around Lake Balaton.
2018	280.0	Transfer of ownership of the entire media portfolio to the Central European Press and Media Foundation (KESMA) without financial compensation. Purchase of the Mátra Power Plant.
2022	480.0	
2023	660.0	
2024	1241.8	
2025	1749.1	

=== Enrichment ===
Mészáros is still a key player in Felcsút, and since 2010 he has become even richer than ever: in 2013 he was the 88th richest Hungarian with a wealth of 6.9 billion, which rose to 31st place by 2016, and 2017, already in 5th place with HUF 120 billion in assets. His assets started to grow sharply, mainly through public procurement after 2010, which his companies gained under unusual business conditions. In the meantime, the mayor has built a real company empire that includes a number of companies with different profiles, from the construction industry to agriculture to the local school buffet. Some of these companies are run by his children. Mészáros Foundation has on several occasions commissioned companies run by his children to do construction in Felcsút. According to the RTL Klub, in 2016 the companies of Mészáros were able to post a total revenue of HUF 225 billion from public procurement. The government related wealth is strengthened by the fact that on several occasions Mészáros's companies sent orders to the companies of Prime Minister Viktor Orbán's family in connection with the procurements, including Orbán's father, Orbán Győző, family businesses as well.

In the autumn of 2016, Opimus Press Zrt., with an unclear background close to Mészáros, acquired 100% of the shares of Mediaworks Hungary Zrt., the operator of the suspended Népszabadság publisher. Behind the transaction, several have speculated a political showdown after the paper previously reported embarrassing affairs to Fidesz. Mészáros, however, in an interview with Bors, denied that he had bought the paper and claimed that he did not have any shares in Opimus. He also denied the news that his confidant, Zoltán Csík, would be a member of the board. He had no opinion on the closure of the paper itself, but said the media was a "weird world" where character assassination attempts were being made against him. He added that he wanted to deal with his existing companies in the future and that he was a businessman, not a politician. On the other hand, it became public knowledge that he had bought Echo TV, stating that he "wanted a good TV" on which Fidesz could rely in the campaign, but denying that Prime Minister Viktor Orbán had a say in the operation of the TV channel. He also said here that he was fine With Lajos Simicska, who had previously quarreled with Orbán, he claims that Simicska had previously helped him thrive in business. It was later revealed that Mészáros had bought from Tamás Gyárfás the building, which previously housed Nap TV complex of Angol Street, to move Echo TV there. The move took place in December 2017. On 3 March 2017, Mészáros acquired a 16.9 percent stake in Opimus Plc., which can be linked to the closure of Népszabadság. After the transaction, the company's share price began to rise spectacularly.

==== 2017 ====
On 30 March 2017, 444.hu and Hír TV visited Felcsút to participate in the extraordinary and public meeting of the representative body, but Mészáros did not want to be recorded at the meeting, so he wanted to exclude the cameras from the meeting and police to enforce this. However, under the current legislation, the press can attend and record the meeting, so that the correspondents could eventually stay. They also wanted to ask the mayor about his role in Opimus, but Mészáros did not answer. According to the Napi.hu April 2017 summary, Mészáros' wealth jumped 100 billion in one year, making him the fifth in the list of the richest Hungarians. Even in a year of unprecedented growth and wealth, other significant deals have been made with his companies:

- In April, Mészáros Konzum Nyrt.'s company and, as a private individual, Mészáros's permanent business partner and friend, Gellért Jászai, bought one of the largest Balaton tourism companies, the former state-owned Balaton Tourist, with which significant Lake Balaton camping areas were acquired. The previous owners were hiding behind a Luxembourg company, but Jászai had been among the owners of the group for some time in the 2000s. The purchase price was not disclosed. As the largest tourism company in the area, its sales in 2016 were more than HUF 1.7 billion.
- Owned Visonta Projekt Kft. Investment of HUF 30 billion in 2018 builds Visonta first wheat starch factory in Hungary. For this, the company received HUF 6.2 billion from the Hungarian state, and Eximbank and MKB Bank also provided loans to it, although Visonta did not earn a penny in the year of its establishment or in 2016, both year, it submitted a negative report. According to Mihály Varga, Minister of National Economy, with the establishment of the new plant, the production of high value-added products will increase, which will open up new market opportunities both at home and abroad.
- He made in the second largest power plant in the country, the Mátra Power Plant, a takeover bid for a 73% stake, which was completed by December.
- By the beginning of June, Mészáros and his company bought 49% of MKB Bank. Thus, the Consum Investment Fund Manager of Mészáros took over the management of the private equity fund, which is the 45% owner of MKB Bank.
- In July, the company of Mészáros and his wife bought a commercial radio called Part FM broadcasting in the Balaton area. Then, on 25 July, Bloomberg Businessweek published an article about Mészáros analyzing the mayor's wealth, after his data was the world's fastest-growing listed company, and its share price had jumped fiftyfold since the beginning of the year.
- In August, it was revealed that Mészáros and his family OTP were able to own land through loans, while also significantly lending to OTP Mészáros companies. At the same time, through his interest in MKB Bank, Mészáros himself lent partly to his own companies and partly to persons close to other politicians.
- By September, in addition to the previous five, three more winery companies had joined Mészáros. The new compositions are from Badacsonyi Pincészet Kft., Tihanyi Borászati Kft. And Tihany-Vin Kft.
- From 3 October, the Budapest Stock Exchange shares of Opus Global Plc., Formerly called Opimus, owned by Mészáros, were traded on (BUX) in the Premium category. According to Opus's first half-year report from BUX in September 2016, its sales jumped more than fivefold to HUF 17.4 billion, and after a loss of 767 million last year, its profits exceeded two billion.
- After obtaining information through a lawsuit on 5 October, it was revealed that Erzsébet Szolgáltató Kft. had spent a total of more than half a billion forints on various companies in Mészáros since 2014, which were thus the biggest winners of the state sponsored camping.
- At the end of October, one of Mészáros's companies partially won the tender for the construction of Bridge in Komárom Danube, despite the fact that a cheaper Slovak offer had been received. According to the National Infrastructure Development Ltd. , the Italian-Slovak consortium could not answer certain additional questions, but according to the consortium, satisfactory answers were given.
- By November, according to the Hungarian edition of Forbes, Mészáros was ranked 8th on the list of the richest Hungarians with 105 billion.
- On 24 November, Mészáros és Mészáros Kft. won two public procurements worth more than HUF 13 billion in pairs with other companies, which deal with the development of wastewater treatment plants and the construction of flood protection facilities.
- In December, the Mátra Power Plant was officially acquired by Mészáros. May 2018, the contractor's daughter, Beatrix Mészáros, became chairman of the power plant's supervisory board.
- In 2017, the Mészáros the doubled agricultural support from the European Union compared to the previous year, although the country received 12 percent less such support this year than in 2016.

==== 2018 ====
In 2018, the growth of the companies of Mészáros and his family members continued, by the end of July they generated almost HUF 229 billion in revenue, mainly from public procurement but high-value deals were also streaking in the rest of the year. This year, a total net tender worth HUF 265 billion was won, 93 percent of which was EU funding. Mészáros announced in April 2018 that he would resign from mayor of Felcsut "to focus solely on his economic interests". By May 2018, the exchange rate of the Consum Private Equity Fund owned by him and his wife rose to HUF 280–300 billion at that time, making Mészáros the second richest man in the country.

Also is 2018 in May Meszaros, founded last year, Hungarian Sport Brands Ltd.'s sports brand, the 2Rule – pronounced "turul" – a deliberately ambiguous, because over the inscription of a stylized turul bird outlines visible, but English can carry "rule" or "dominate the track" report. In July, three football teams, Diósgyőr, Haladás, and Puskás Akadémia also presented themselves in the brand's jerseys, which they intend to wear in the 2018/19 season. It was later revealed that the public media, also accused of being close to the government, advertised Mészáros's brand in a barter business without financial compensation, which is why the LMP reported treatment, alleging dishonesty.

At the end of August 2018, it turned out that the Konzum Group belonging to Mészáros and Viktor Orbán's son-in-law, owned by István Tiborcz, BDPST Zrt., entered into a strategic partnership in the real estate market. By November 2018, in addition to several Fidesz-related media, Talentis Group Zrt., owned by Mészáros, purchased new media and publishers, registered in September of that year, to donate them to the Central European Press and Media Foundation, to create a larger-than-government media empire. By the end of 2018, Forbes ranked Mészáros as the richest man in Hungary with HUF 381.3 billion, and by March 2019 he was ranked 2057th on the list of dollar billionaires with HUF 279 billion.

==== 2019 ====
In January 2019, the Mészáros family and their business partner, László Szíjj construction contractor, together became 81.5% owners in MKB Bank. Since 2010, the construction companies of Mészáros and Szjj have won more than HUF 2,000 billion in public procurement. ZÁÉV Építőipari Zrt., which belongs to it, won two construction tenders in addition to the price announced in them: the Zalaegerszeg instead of the estimated HUF 5.6 billion in the public procurement of local government for HUF 8.8 billion. Újpest estimated 2.2 billion forints for the ice rink. instead, it undertook construction for double, 4.7 billion. ZÁÉV also won the Városliget public procurement for the general construction works of the new Ethnographic Museum and Visitor Center planned for 25.97 billion. It is in Tokaj-Hegyalja also the only five-star hotel that has received a non-refundable grant of HUF 324.5 million from the Hungarian Tourism Agency. Mészáros also acquired all the significant enterprises of Lajos Simicska, who was estranged from Orbán. Moreover, Mészáros' company won the 4 billion public procurement in the consortium, which tobacco products aims to monitor, the monitoring is required by EU law anyway.

In April 2019, the company won public procurement again at a higher price than the estimated price, this time Mészáros és Mészáros Kft. A company linked to István Tiborcz, Viktor Orbán's son-in-law, is also involved in this deal. On the other hand, the Upper Tisza tender for the construction of a flood reservoir could be 6 billion more expensive than the estimated price. The amounts are paid by the European Union through the EEHOP (Environment and Energy Efficiency Operational Program). Mészáros can also build a football academy in Szombathely, for which he won nearly 6 billion forints. Also in April 2019, one of Mészáros' companies, RM International Zrt., won with two Chinese companies in a consortium the public tender for the renovation of the Budapest – Belgrade railway line. Renovation with a Chinese loan on the 160-kilometer railway line is planned to cost HUF 750 billion, making it the largest railway investment in Hungary to date. However, the meaning and cost of the Chinese railway investment raised several questions.

In May 2019, 4iG Plc increased a thousand-fold the stock market value after the previous year – wins Ft 689 million total server centers written compile into installing and extended warranty service of centralized procurement procedure. Mészáros' two companies, Opus and Konzum, merged on 30 June to "increase efficiency" after the Konzum PE Private Equity Fund merged with Opus Global Plc. Meszáros' daughter, Beatrix Mészáros, who graduated in April, was entrusted with the management of the giant company thus formed. At the beginning of July, in a public tender, ZÁÉV zrt. – together with Zrt Építő- és épkarbantadó . The planned cost of the investment is about HUF 8 billion. In September, Mészáros és Mészáros Kft., Together with Euroaszfalt Zrt., Won a public procurement for the development of the wastewater drainage and treatment of the city of Komárom in the amount of HUF 5.8 billion from a 420 billion public procurement framework contract. Meanwhile, it turned out that the Hungarian state had to pay significant taxpayers' money as a penalty, which was imposed by the European Commission precisely because of Hungarian public procurement habits.

At the end of the year, public procurements were awarded, such as the public procurement for the Tiszavasvár for remediation of the former Alkaloid landfill in 9 billion, or the public procurement for the development of waste management in several settlements in North Lake Balaton for almost 3 billion. According to the annual report of Hunguest Hotels Zrt., which is part of Mészáros interests, it had a sales revenue of HUF 26.86 billion in 2019, which means a plus of more than HUF 3 billion after HUF 23.66 billion in 2018. other companies also prospered significantly this year, Mészáros és Mészáros Kft. were able to post more than 37 billion more profits than in 2018, and Mészáros himself received a HUF 20 billion dividend from his companies that participated well in public procurement. At the end of 2019, Forbes again named Mészáros as the richest Hungarian with a fortune of HUF 407.7 billion.

==== 2020 ====
In January 2020, the Hungarian state bought the previously majority-owned, unprofitable Mátra Power Plant from Mészáros, citing the "preservation of jobs there", which critics said, like the previous owners, Mészáros had only withdrawn money from the power plant. In addition, a journalist interested in the financial details of the transaction, like other people close to the government, was disturbed by the fact that he was not a public figure. It was later revealed that the state had paid HUF 17 billion for the power plant and classified the transaction as "of national strategic importance", which means that the Hungarian Competition Authority has no way of investigating. In the meantime, it won a tender for the development of the railways, which has become more and more expensive by one and a half billion in the meantime.

According to data later requested by the MSZP, the purchase of the power plant cost the state more than HUF 75 billion in total, because the company requested a capital increase of HUF 26.4 billion in addition to the purchase price, the same bridging framework to keep the power plant operational and HUF 4.9 billion forint member loan. At the beginning of April, Mészáros and István Tiborcz won a joint venture to develop two ports in Lake Balaton. He also became interested in a restaurant called Borpatika in the 1st district, which was formerly owned by musician Ákos Kovács and winemaker and former Fidesz MP Zsolt Tiffán The restaurant was later closed down.

In April, its interests won new railway tenders worth HUF 30 billion. Although the Hungarian economy was also in a difficult situation due to the outbreak of the coronavirus pandemic in early 2020, Mészáros' company Opus Global Nyrt. reported a net profit after tax of HUF 2.704 billion in the first quarter, compared to a loss of HUF 16.606 billion in the same period of the previous year, according to the company's first quarter report. On 20 April, Mészáros' Status Next Environmental Private Equity Fund acquired Envirotis Holding, one of the country's major waste management groups, and was subsequently granted a permit to recultivate millions of tonnes of red sludge accumulated over decades in the reservoirs of Almasfüzitő. Mészáros bought a holiday home in the Tihany for Old Town of more than half a billion forints, which is "orchard" on paper, but in fact there is a holiday home with a pool. There are several people close to the government on the street. The seller was János Eppel, owner of Porsche Hungária, who was the government's preferred supplier and the winner of more than half a thousand hectares of state-owned land auctions.

In August, Mészáros és Mészáros Kft. won public contracts worth a total of HUF 11 billion, first for the Paks Nuclear Power Plant in a preparatory works for the new unit of consortium for HUF 2.2 billion, and then for the Lake Fertő complex development of the waterworks for HUF 8.9 billion. At the end of the year, a huge merger took place with the participation of Budapest Bank Zrt., MKB Bank Plc. And MTB Magyar Takarékszövetkezeti Bank Zrt., Which manages the Takarék Group, from which they wanted to create a new "superbank" called Magyar Bankholding Zrt. The group was led by a number of other people close to the government, and Viktor Orbán declared the move "of national strategic importance". The purchase of the entire share package of TIGÁZ by Opus Global Plc. was also discussed.

==== 2021 ====
At the beginning of the year, Mészáros' companies also took part in renovation of the Citadel and the planning of the National Medical Innovation Center. In the meantime production of railway vehicles, an agreement was reached on the and the acquisition of another mineral water company. The family company of Mészáros, B. Á.L. Gerecse-Plusz Kft., Owned by Zrt., For the MLSZ construction of training center won net 1.9 billion (brutto 2.3 billion) HUF public procurement. At the beginning of the year, the Curia confirmed also that, contrary to his previous claim, Mészáros was considered a public figure. This was done after the previous journalists of Heti Válasz wrote: It was in Mészáros' interest that he acquired and liquidated the paper in 2019.

Companies and enterprises belonging to Mészáros' interests also received tourism subsidies. The near Lake Neusiedl was construction of a public holiday complex also started by one of Mészáros's construction companies earlier this year, which also damaged the surrounding roads, but also caused outrage among local holiday home owners to demolish their holiday homes at no cost to the state, did not provide compensation. In addition, the investment in a nature reserve, Hunguest Hotels Zrt., which is also linked to Mészáros, received a 17.7 billion state renovation grant. It also turned out that two-thirds of the HUF 300 billion that could be distributed by the Hungarian Tourism Agency went to 0.1% of the applicants, who happened to be companies belonging to Mészáros' interests. What's more, it hit hardest in the year 2020, when a number of other tourism businesses struggled to survive. The construction of the Budapest Multifunctional Sports Hall, built by the companies of Mészáros and other businessmen close to the government, also became ten times more expensive than the project. A former mill company involved in a multi-billion dollar fraud also managed to obtain a refurbished mill at a price.

The E.ON 100% stake in Tiszántúli Áramhálózati Zrt. (Titász) became the property of Opus Energy Kft., which belongs to Mészáros. The companies that became eligible for the liquidation of companies that became insolvent during the coronavirus epidemic included the companies of Mészáros and several other people close to the government. In May, Mészáros' hotel in Eger received state support of 2.8 billion, while Eger itself received only HUF 825 million in compensation for the epidemic. Meanwhile, the court dismissed Mészáros's new lawsuit, which was called by András Fekete-Győr, of Momentum president, as "a strawman" who would be held accountable for the crimes he committed after 2022. According to the court, Mészáros, as a public business figure, must tolerate criticism, as Fekete-Győr said opinions, not slanders. In June, Forbes republished the list of the richest Hungarians, again led by Mészáros, whose wealth grew by 185 billion in 2020, despite the coronavirus epidemic, making it the first with HUF 479.4 billion.

On 11 June, Mészáros was interviewed at the Index, where he praised most of his own businesses and criticized critical opinions with him and his companies. After Mészáros's earlier statements were often more robed and controversial, it was a matter of an interview – especially since Index.hu also became close to the government. However, the more sophisticated-style interview still had more contradictory and less realistic statements. He also talked about taking Munkácsy pictures from the Imre Pákh art collector, but according to Pákh there was no such thing, only a possible museum location was agreed upon. Following the release of the interview, Opus Global Plc.'s shares on the Budapest Stock Exchange were worth 6.3 billion more than that morning. His appearance also changed a lot by 2021: he lost weight spectacularly and it is possible that he had plastic surgery. All this was linked to his new relationship.

V-Híd Építő Zrt., which is part of its interest, won the expansion of the railway tracks between Kelenföld and Ferencváros railway stations for almost 338 billion. According to expert opinions, the cost of such work may not exceed HUF 30–50 billion, so the issue of overpricing has arisen here as well. According to Napi.hu, in 2021 Mészáros donated the most in the year, although the data on the list were based on self-reports. According to this, he spent nearly one and a half billion this year on charity, compared to 5.1 billion in the five years before, which is roughly 1% of his wealth. According to András Fekete-Győr, Mészáros, who was enriched with public money, should return 99% of his wealth to the Hungarian society, not 1%.

== Football ==
Around 2007 Mészáros began to invest in his local football team, and acquired it in 2008. He has been sponsoring the team for many years. He oversaw the government-funded construction of the 3500-seat Pancho Aréna football stadium in Felcsút. He is in an undisclosed relationship, officially main sponsor of the Croatian football team Osijek. Rumour has it he is the main owner of the club. After his rumoured purchase of the team, the Hungarian government sponsored the football academy in Osijek with €3.3 million.

== Family ==
Since 1986, Mészáros was married to Lőrincné Mészáros (née Beatrix Csilla Kelemen), who in 2019 was ranked by Forbes as the most influential business woman in Hungary. On 4 September 2020, it was announced that they were divorcing, but the reasons for the divorce were not disclosed. Afterwards, his former wife moved to Hegyvidék, the XII district of Budapest, an affluent neighborhood where several influential persons who have close ties with the government own or owned properties. She also cut ties with a range of business interests. After rumours had circulated for months, Mészáros' relationship with TV personality Andrea Várkonyi was announced in April 2021. Prior to that, Várkonyi had had a working relationship with Mészáros' media enterprises. They married on 24 September 2021.

Children of Mészáros and his former wife Beatrix Csilla Kelemen are Lőrinc, Beatrix, Ágnes, who works at the family holding. Lőrinc Mészáros Jr. is a farmer and a site manager, lawyer Beatrix Mészáros is the head of agricultural affairs, Ágnes Homlok-Mészáros is the head of the mineral water business. In addition, all three children are members of Konzum Zrt's board of directors, while Beatrix and Ágnes are also members of Opimus Press Zrt. Beatrix later became chairman of the Mátra Power Plant Supervisory Board. His brother, János Mészáros, also won several high-value public procurement contracts after 2013.

== In the media ==
On 25 July 2017, Bloomberg Businessweek published an article on Mészáros analyzing the mayor's wealth after the controversial acquisition of 21% in the Hungarian conglomerate Konzum Nyrt. Konzum's share prices dropped 99% in one year before the acquisition, along with a sevenfold increase in its short-term debt, and it cut off its staff by 86 percent. In the year after the acquisition the share prices increased 50-fold has a market value of about $142 million. After the media questioned how is this spectacular growth possible, Meszaros responded "Maybe I'm smarter than Zuckerberg". The stock prices of another Mészáros company, Opimus Global Nyrt., underwent another spectacular eight-fold increase in less than a year.
