= Levente Szabó (banker) =

- Born: June 2, 1972 (age 54)
- Education: College of Finance and Accounting in Budapest and University of Pécs
- Occupation: Banker
- Known for: Deputy CEO of MBH Bank

Levente László Szabó is a Hungarian banker who is deputy CEO of MBH Bank and former CEO of Takarékbank.

== Education ==
Szabó graduated from the College of Finance and Accounting in Budapest, with a focus on financial institutions and later earned his doctorate from János University in Pécs.

== Career ==
Szabó started his career in 1997 at Bank Austria-Creditanstalt Rt., focusing on key account management. By 1999, he assumed the role of a team leader within the department of German corporate customers at Takarékbank. In 2003, he was put in charge of one the business branches within the bank. From October 2005 onwards, Szabó served as the managing director, overseeing the bank's corporate financing activities as well as the IT strategy and development. In 2006, he was elected as a member of Takarékbank's board.

From August 2013 until January 2017 he assumed the role of CEO at Takarék Bank. He then held the position of CEO at FHB Bank Kereskedelmi Zrt from April 2017 to 2019, while also being deputy CEO at Takarékbank. Starting January 1, 2022, Szabó became a board member of Magyar Bankholding Zrt. Subsequently, he took on the roles of president and CEO at MTB Magyar Takarékzövetkezeti Bank Zrt and Takarékbank Zrt. In April 2022, he joined MKB Bank's board of directors. During and after the merger of MKB and Takarékbank to form MBH Bank in November 2023, Szabó held the position of deputy CEO for Individual Services of the new bank.
