= FHB Mortgage Bank =

Hungarian mortgage re-financer

FHB Mortgage Bank Nyrt.

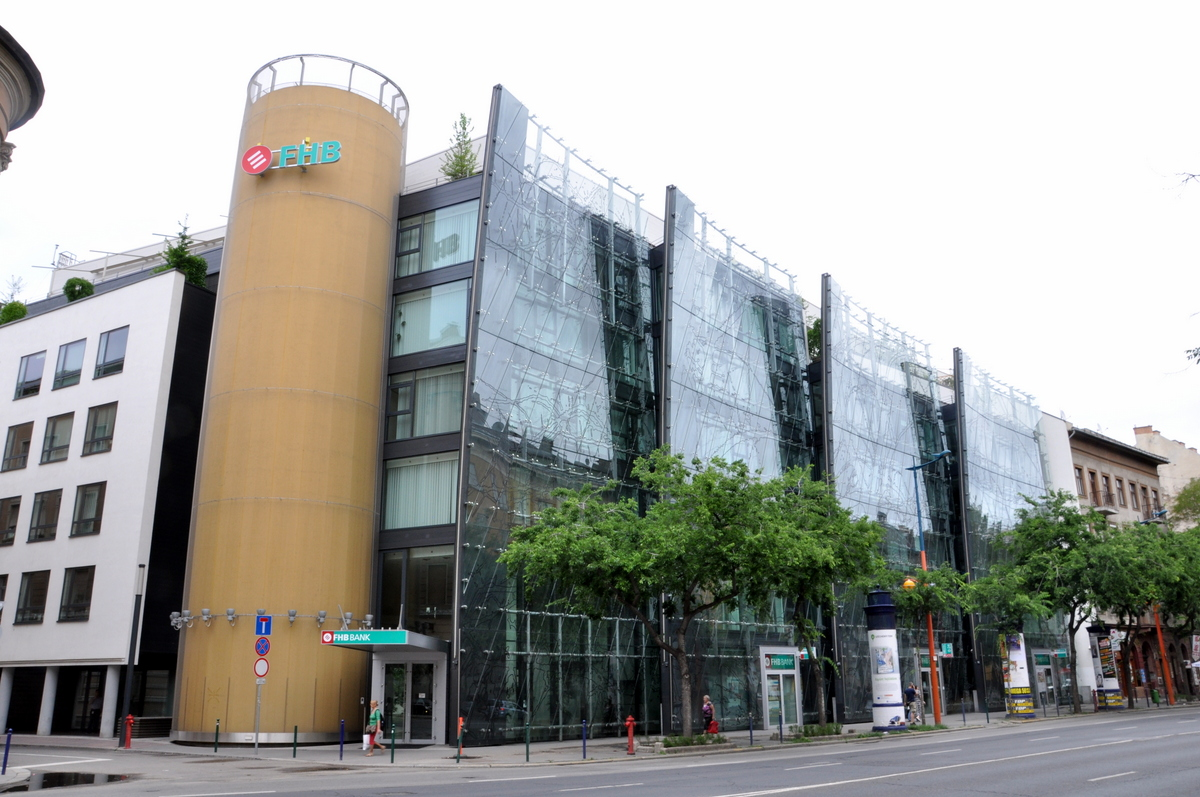
- FHB Bank head office, Ülli útca 48 in Budapest, photographed in 2012
- Type: Public
- Traded as: BPSE: FHB; BUX Component
- Industry: Banking, Financial services
- Founded: 1997
- Defunct: 2016
- Fate: Merged with Takarékbank
- Headquarters: Budapest, Hungary
- Area served: Central and Eastern Europe
- Key people: dr. Zoltán Spéder (Chairman)
- Products: Consumer banking, corporate banking, finance and insurance, investment banking, mortgage loans, private banking, private equity, wealth management
- Number of employees: 774
- Website: en.fhb.hu/fhb-bank

FHB Mortgage Bank was Hungary's largest mortgage re-financer. Formerly state-owned, it was floated on the stock market in 2003, and the government sold its remaining A shares in 2007. As of 17 August 2011, FHB Mortgage Bank Co. Plc. had a market capitalization of US$232.4 million.

In late 2016 Takarék Group acquired a majority stake in FHB Mortgage Bank, thus beginning one of the largest mergers in the Hungarian banking industry, which was finished in 2020 with the creation of Takarékbank through the merger of 11 saving co-operatives (including former FHB Bank).

In April 2018, it was announced that the members of the Group would undergo a name and brand change following the expected decision at the annual general meeting to be held at the end of April. The new brand name will be “Takarék” instead of “FHB.”

== See also ==
- List of banks in Hungary
