= Takarékbank =

TakarékBank Zrt.
- Type: Private
- Industry: Cooperative banking, financial services
- Founded: 18 April 1989
- Defunct: 30 April 2023
- Successor: MBH Bank
- Headquarters: Budapest, Hungary
- Products: Consumer banking, corporate banking, credit cards, finance and insurance, foreign currency exchange, investment banking, mortgage loans, private banking, private equity, wealth management
- AUM: Ft 1,189 billion
- Website: takarekbank.hu

TakarékBank (lit. 'Savings Bank') was a banking and financial services corporation in Hungary and the central institution for more than 60 co-operative banks and their 1,100 branch offices. In 2023, it merged with MKB Bank to form MBH Bank.

== Overview ==
Since its inception in 1989, TakarékBank functioned both as a central institution and as a corporate and investment bank. The bank headquartered in Budapest, and as a holding, the Takarék Group defined itself primarily as a service provider for the local cooperative banks and their over 1 million clients. TakarékBank is the short form of the Magyar Takarékszövetkezeti Bank Zrt. (literally "Hungarian Central Co-operative Bank"). TakarékBank represented the interests of the Hungarian Cooperative Financial Institutions at both national and international levels and coordinated and developed the joint strategy within the network. The bank advised and supported his members on legal, taxation, and business management issues. TakarékBank was member of the EACB and the Euro Banking Association. The bank was also member of the Budapest Stock Exchange.

In late 2016 Takarék Group acquired majority stake in FHB Mortgage Bank, thus beginning one of the largest mergers in the Hungarian banking industry, which was finished in 2020.

In 2019 TakarékBank consolidated 11 saving co-operatives to form the fifth largest Hungarian financial institution, owning assets worth HUF 2.3tn.

After Budapest Bank merged into MBK Bank in March 2022, in May 2023 TakarékBank and MBK Bank merged to form MBH Bank.

== List of CEOs ==
- Zsolt Hernádi (1994–2001)
- Péter Csicsáky (2001–2013)
- József Vida (2017–2021)
- Levente Szabó (2013–2017, 2021–2023)

== See also ==
- DZ Bank
- Bundesverband der Deutschen Volksbanken und Raiffeisenbanken
- Erste Group
- OTP Bank
- Economy of Hungary
- List of banks in Hungary
