= Scarab Research =

Scarab Research Inc.
- Type: Private
- Industry: Software (Recommendation systems for e-commerce, e-publishing)
- Founded: 2009
- Headquarters: Budapest, Hungary
- Area served: Worldwide
- Key people: Viktor Szathmáry (CEO); Dániel Fogaras (CSO)
- Products: Scarab Recommender; Scarab Cloud
- Services: Software development
- Website: scarabresearch.com

Scarab Research is a research and development company specialized in recommender systems and machine learning.

== History ==
Scarab Research was founded in 2009 by a group of European scientists and IT engineers. Its development operations were based in Budapest, Hungary.

Before its acquisition, Scarab Research was one of the first Central European companies to develop a scalable, real-time product recommendation engine using machine learning. The company's technology was implemented by various online retailers across Europe, and contributed significantly to the early adoption of personalization in e-commerce in the region.

In December 2013, Scarab Research was acquired by Emarsys (an SAP company).

== Scarab Cloud ==
Scarab Cloud is the name of Scarab Research's cloud-based SaaS e-commerce product recommender service.
