= MagNet Bank =

Community bank in Hungary

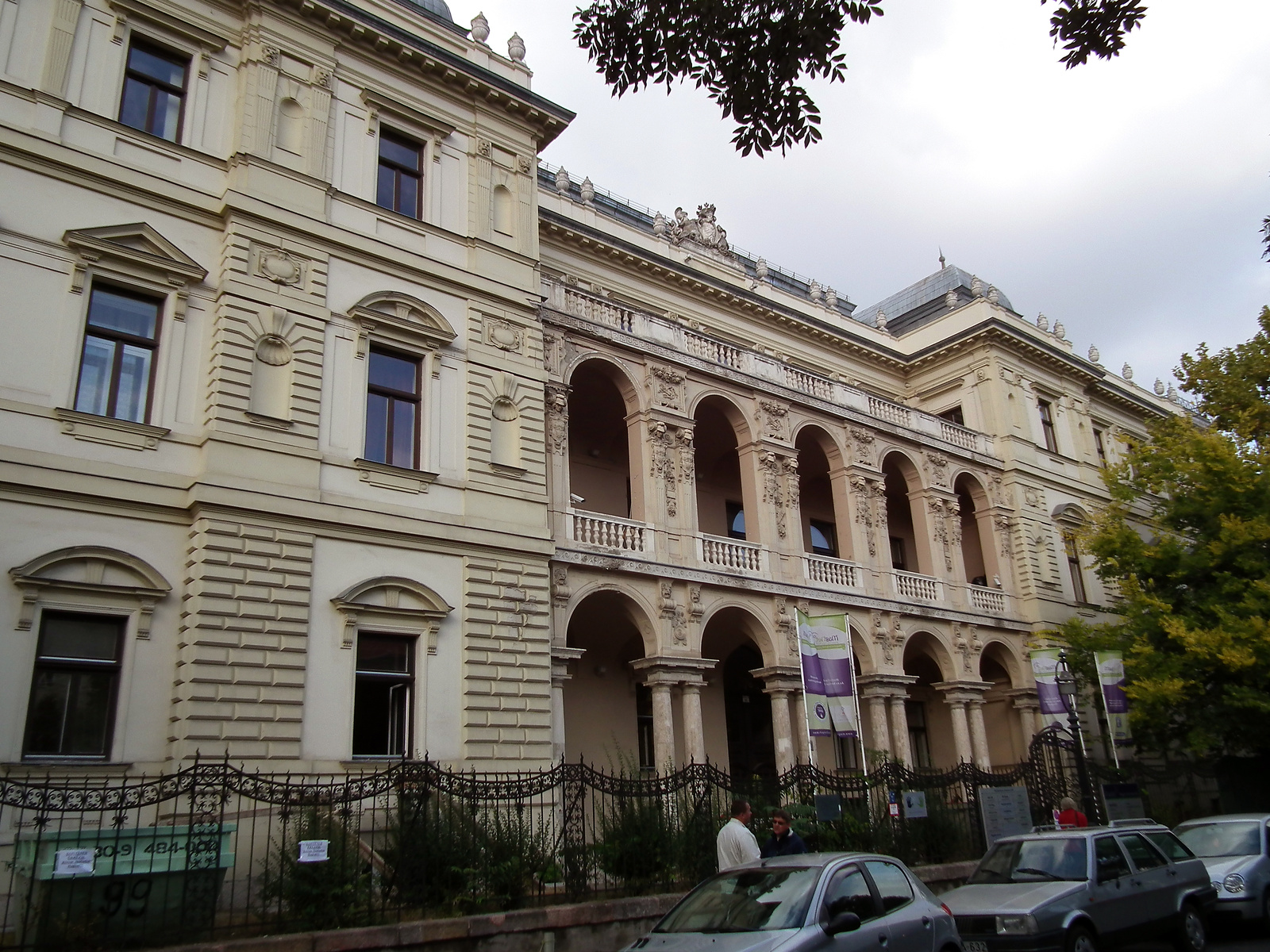
- MagNet Bank head office, Andrássy útca 98 in Budapest
- Formerly: HBW Express Takarékszövetkezet
- Type: Public
- Industry: Financial services
- Founded: 7 November 1995
- Headquarters: Budapest, Hungary
- Key people: Fáy Zsolt (CEO), Attila Rostás, János Salamon
- Products: Banking and insurance
- Net income: Ft 1.421 billion (2019)
- Total assets: Ft 163.165 billion (2019)
- Total equity: Ft 14.74 billion (2019)
- Website: www.netbank.hu

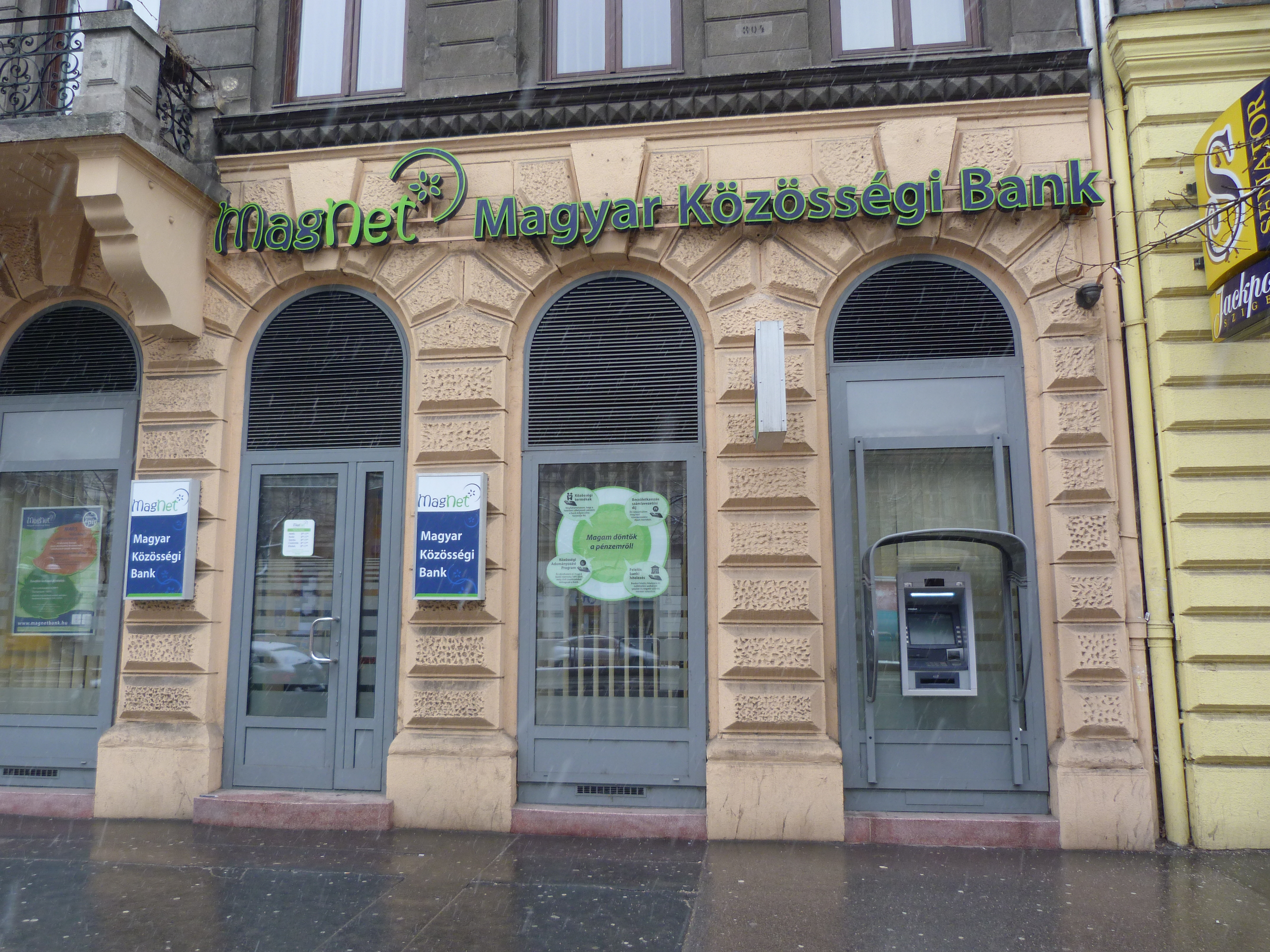
A bank building in Budapest

MagNet Bank (Hungarian: MagNet Magyar Közösségi Bank Zrt., lit. 'MagNet Hungarian Community Bank'), known as the HBW Express Savings Co-operative (Hungarian: HBW Express Takarékszövetkezet) until 2010, is the only community bank in Hungary that practises ethical banking. It is owned by Hungarian citizens.

MagNet Bank has a network of 12 branches along its center in the capital, Budapest. Its financial products are retail, loan, term deposits, community banking products, online banking, debit cards and insurance.

Since September 2013, the MagNet Bank standardised the debit MasterCard. It has automated teller machine, at each branch.

== See also ==
- List of banks in Hungary
