= Oncotherm =

Medical devices used for cancer treatment

Oncotherm medical devices are produced by Oncotherm Ltd. and used for cancer treatment.

== Methodology ==
The company's methodology is based on the view of its founder that the heat-dose sensitive characterization of tissue is at the core of the oncothermia treatment. The tumor tissue has lower impedance than the surrounding tissues, so most of the energy is transmitted and absorbed by the cancerous lesion. This selection of the tumor tissues (self-focusing) renders external focusing unnecessary.

== Company ==
Oncotherm Ltd. was founded in 1988 by Prof. Dr. András Szász in Hungary. In 2002, it received investment from a German company and was reorganized as a German-Hungarian company consisting of Oncotherm Hungary Ltd and Oncotherm GmbH.

== Medical devices ==
Their main products are the Oncotherm EHY-2000 and the Oncotherm EHY-2030, hyperthermia devices using the thermoelectric effects of electrical fields.

More than 450 devices have been placed into operation, mostly in Germany and South Korea, and performed over 400,000 treatments. The devices are not approved by the U.S. Food and Drug Administration.
