= Budapest Bank =

- Company type: Limited liability company
- Industry: Financial services
- Founded: 1987
- Defunct: 31 March 2022
- Headquarters: Váci út 193., Budapest, Hungary
- Key people: Zolnai György (CEO)
- Number of employees: about 2800
- Website: www.budapestbank.hu

Budapest Bank was a commercial bank founded in 1987 with headquarters in Budapest, Hungary.

In 1995 the bank was sold to GE Capital, but in 2015 it became again a state owned bank.

In 2020 Budapest bank announced a merger with MKB Bank and the Budapest Bank and Takarékbank to form MBH Bank. In 2022 Budapest Bank merged into MKB as part of that plan.

== Buildings ==
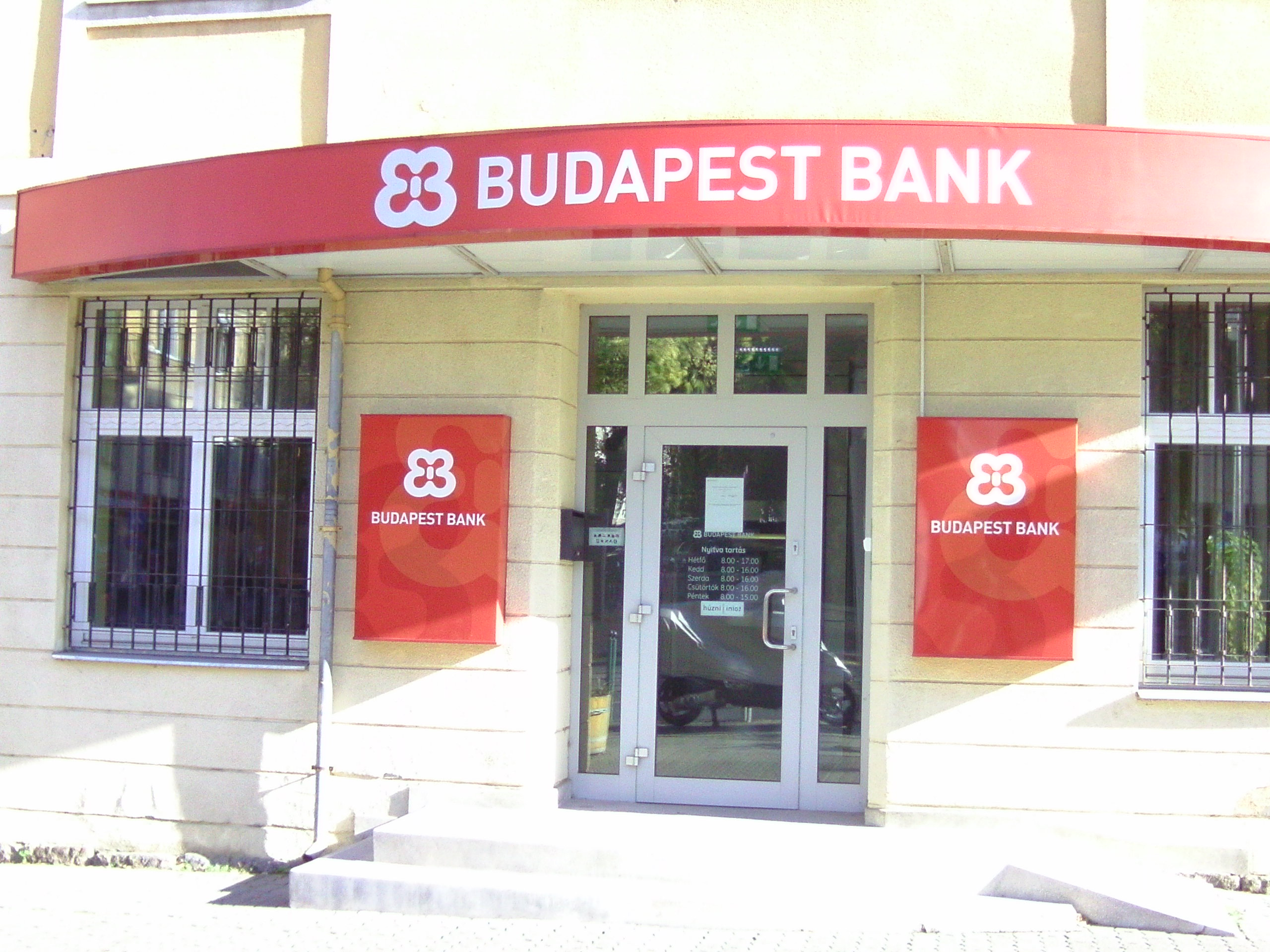
Budapest Bank in Böszörményi út, Budapest

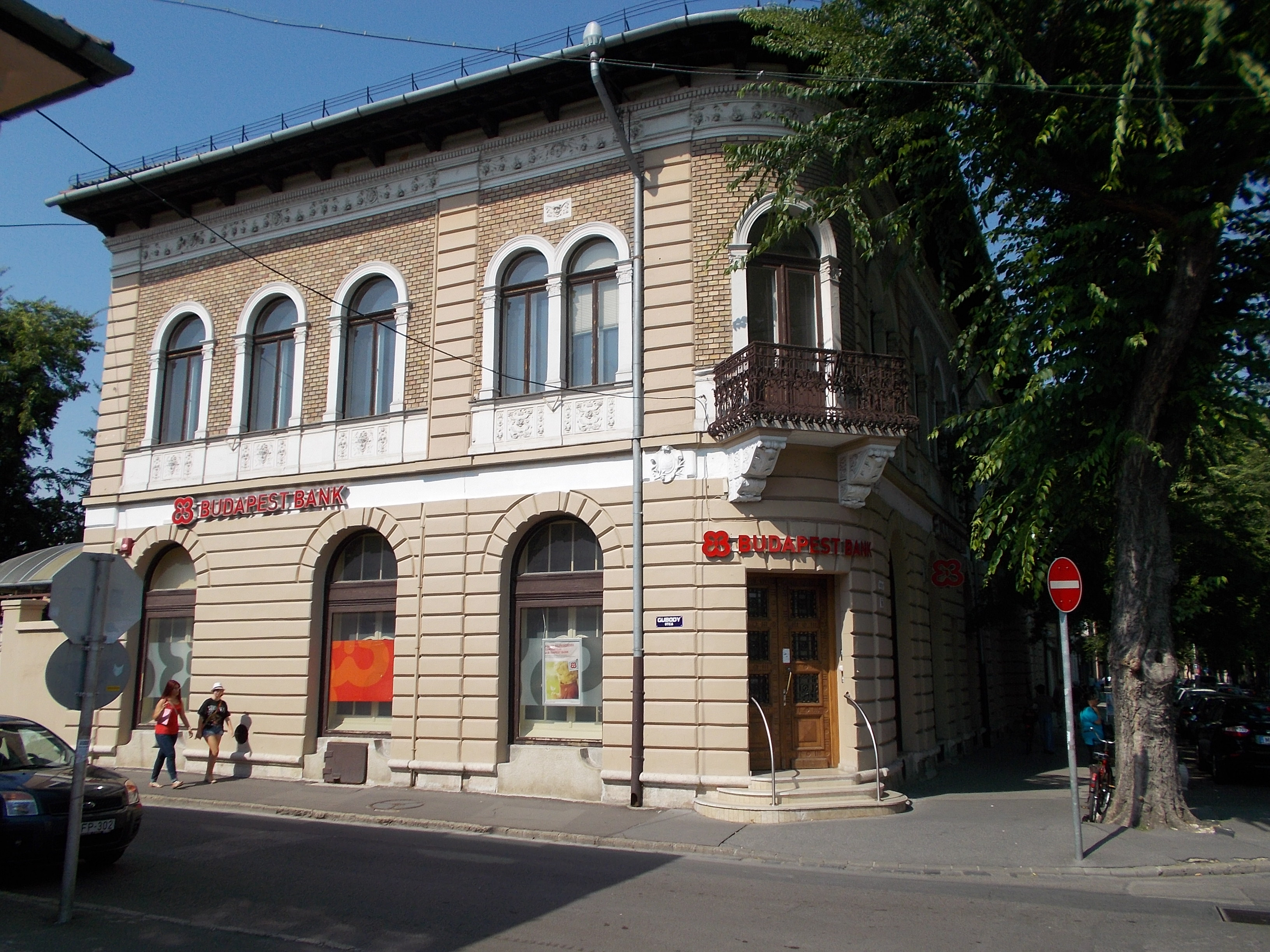
Budapest Bank in Cegléd

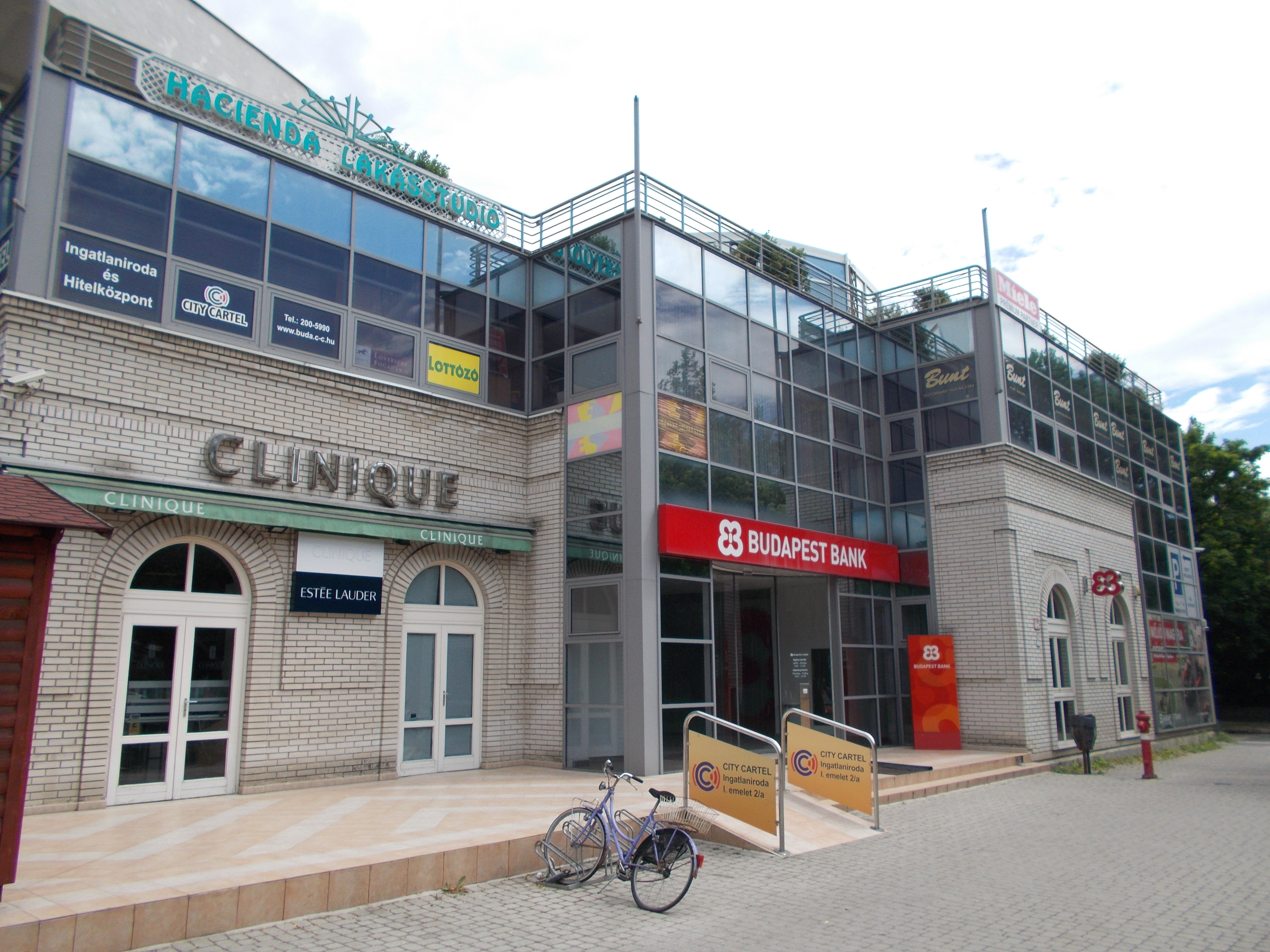
Budapest Bank in Budagyöngye Shopping Center, Budapest

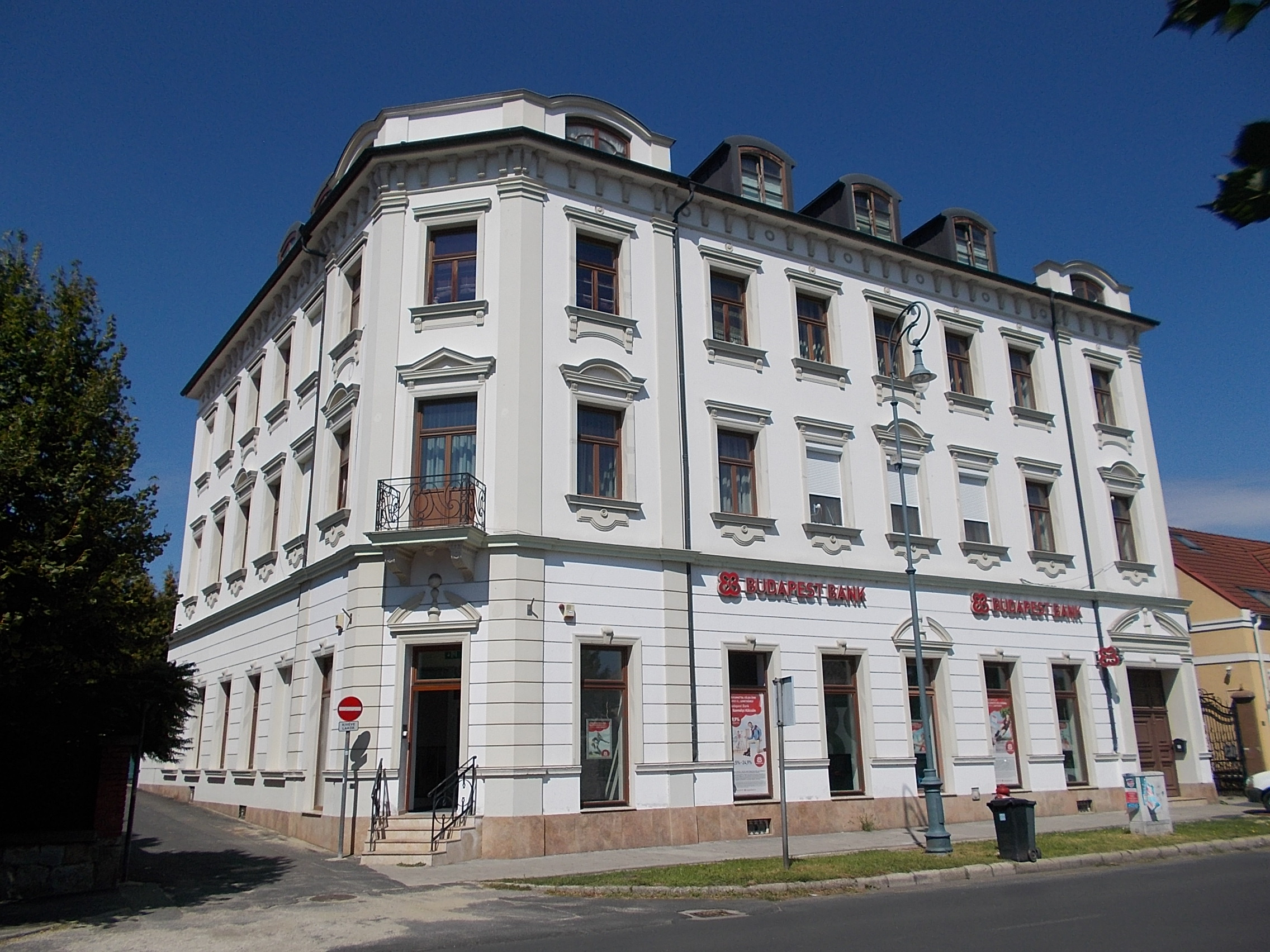
Budapest Bank in Keszthely

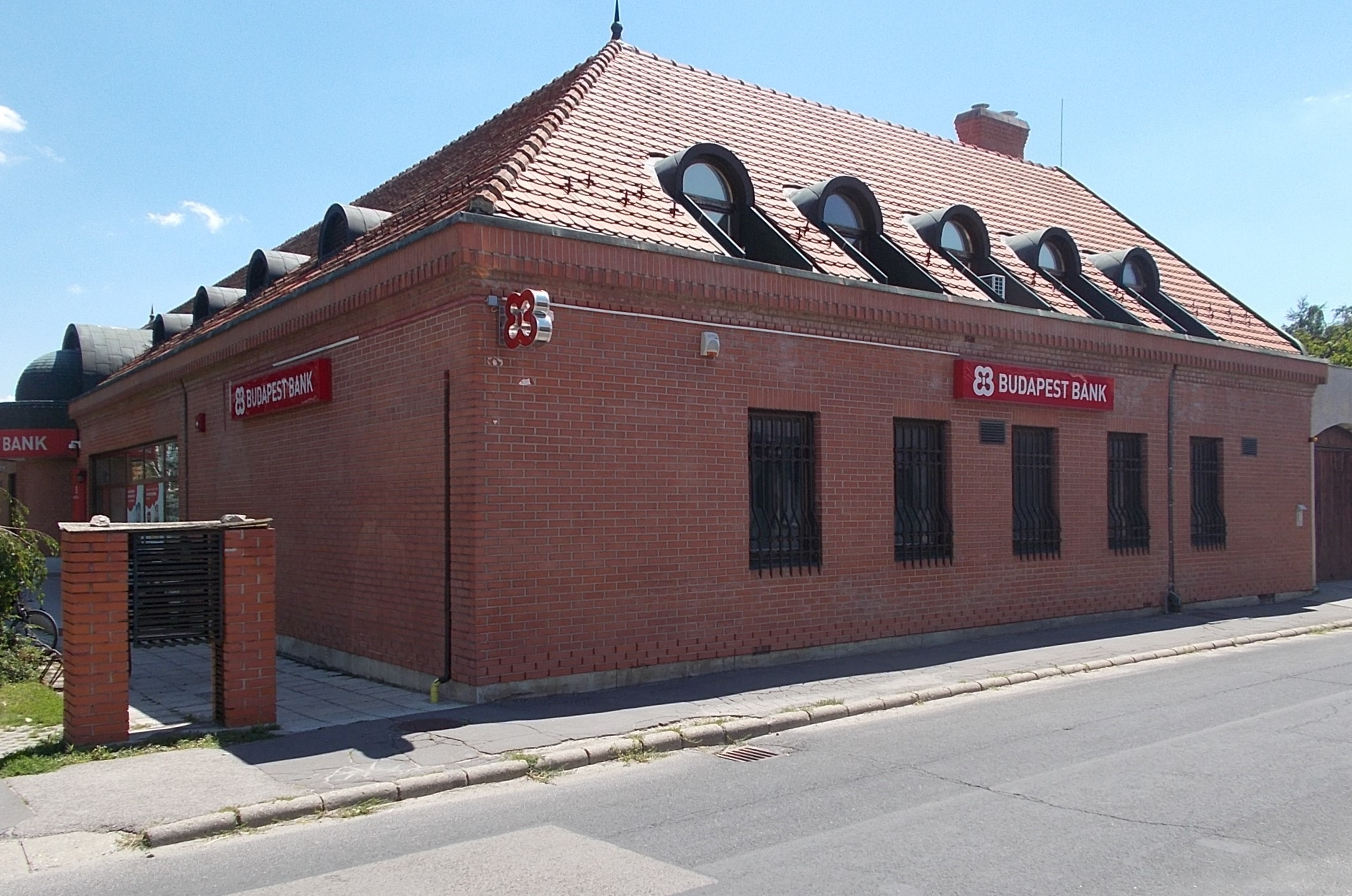
Budapest Bank in Ráckeve

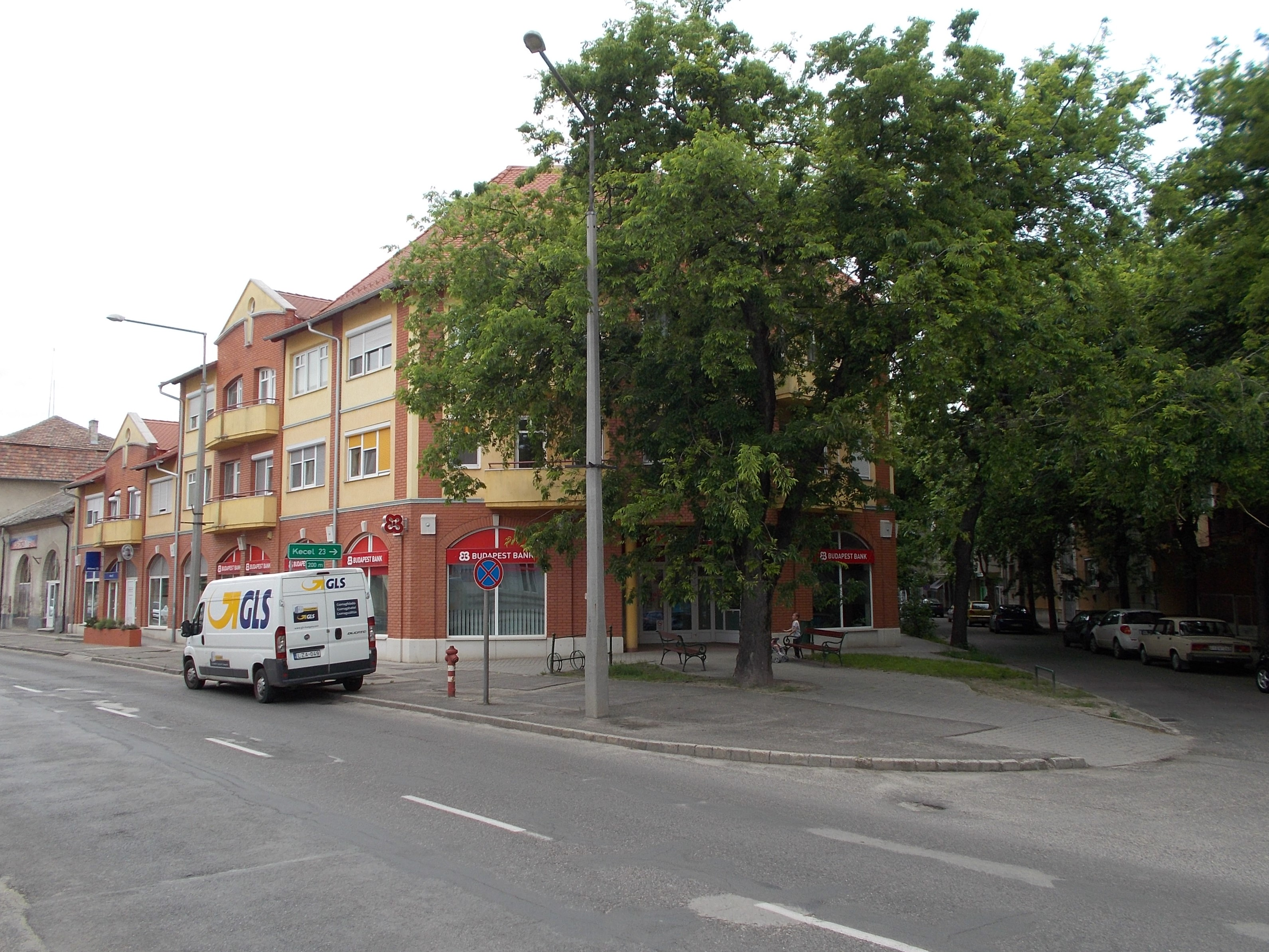
Budapest Bank in Kiskunhalas

== See also ==
- List of banks in Hungary
