= Organica Technologies =

Company in Hungary

- Founded: 1998; 28 years ago in Budapest, Hungary
- Headquarters: Budapest, Hungary
- Area served: Worldwide
- Website: Official website

Organica Technologies is a Hungarian company that builds wastewater treatment plants. It is founded in 1998. Organica's wastewater treatment processes the water with the use of living organisms.
