= CIB Bank =

Bank in Hungary

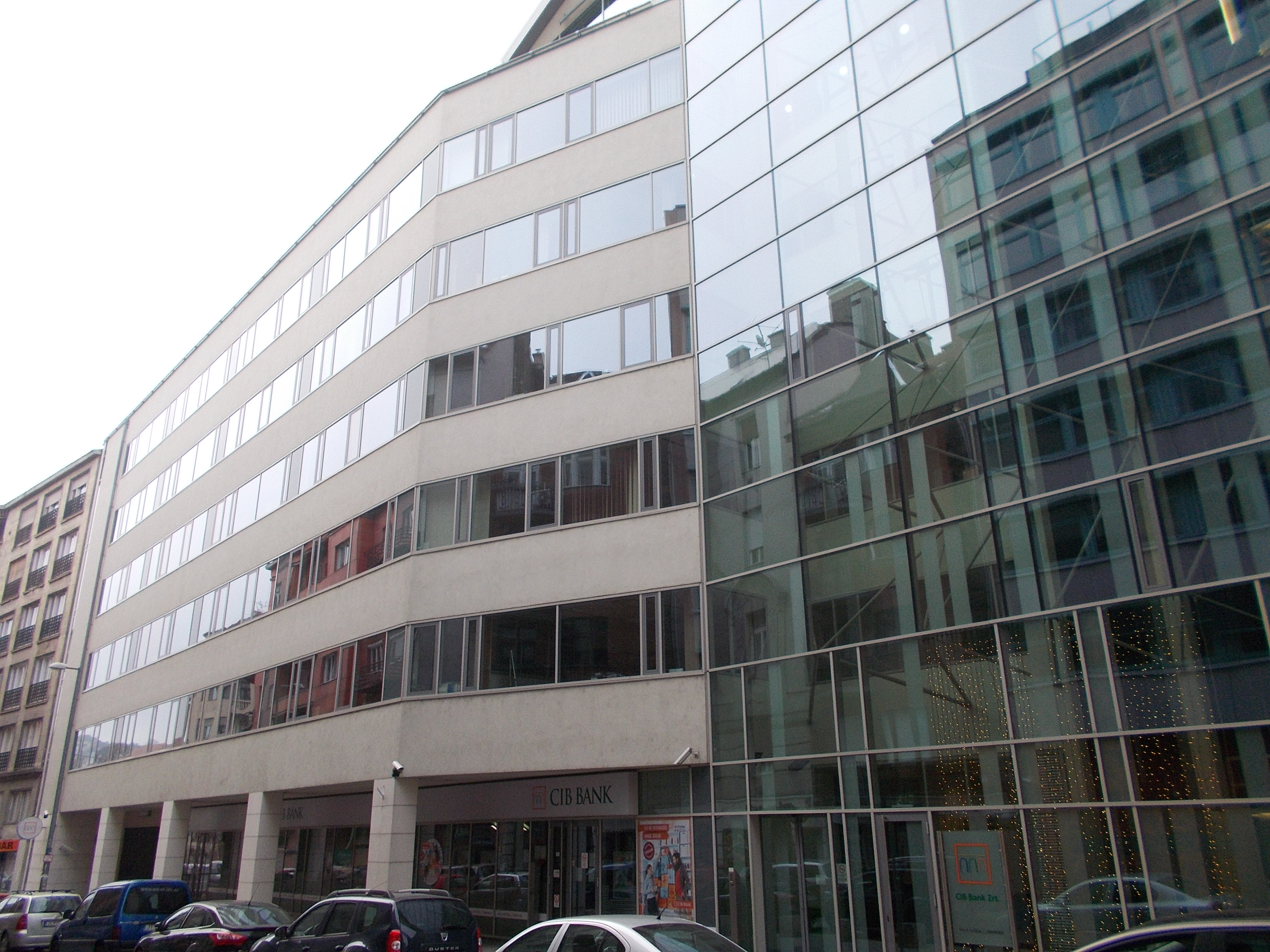
- Registered head office of CIB Bank, Petrezselyem utca 2-8 in Budapest
- Type: Public
- Industry: Finance and insurance
- Founded: 1979
- Headquarters: Budapest, Hungary
- Products: Commercial banking
- Revenue: ▼€449.8 million (2025)
- Operating income: ▲€219.8 million (2025)
- Net income: ▲€196.8 million (2025)
- Total assets: ▲€10.04 billion (2025)
- Total equity: ▲€980.9 million (2025)
- Parent: Intesa Sanpaolo
- Website: www.cib.hu

CIB Bank (or Central European International Bank Ltd.) was created trough a merger with Inter-Európa Bank in January 2008 following the 2007 merger of their respective Italian parent companies, Banca Intesa and Sanpaolo IMI to form Intesa Sanpaolo. The bank is the seventh-biggest commercial bank in Hungary as of 2025.

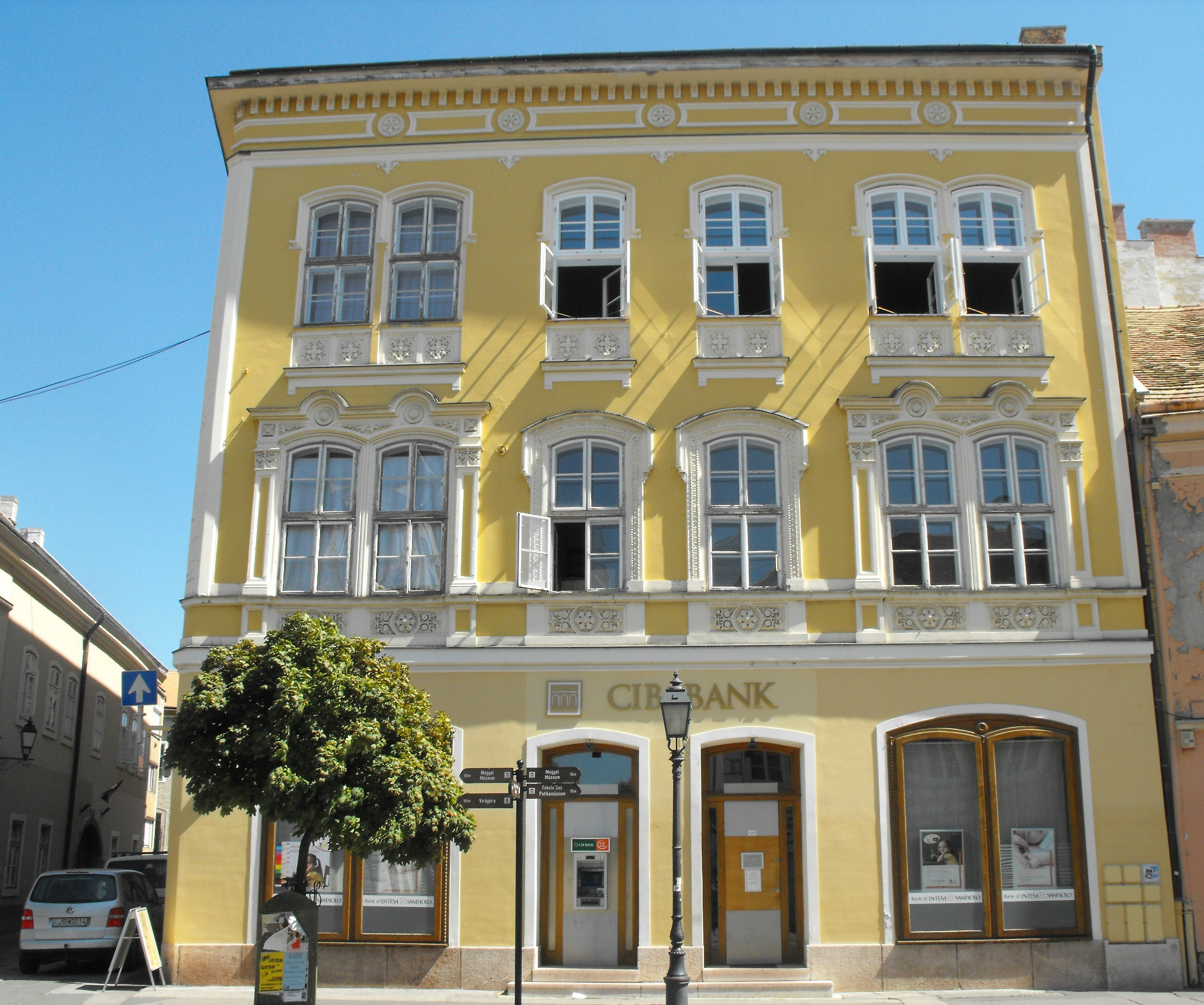
CIB Bank branch in Székesfehérvár

== History ==
=== Foundation ===
CIB was registered under Hungarian Company Law of 1875.

On 9 November 1979, the Central-European International Bank Ltd was established in Budapest as an exchange bank and began its operations in 1980.

On the basis of the Company Law of 1988 and after the establishment of the two-tier banking system in 1988 the CIB Hungária Bank Rt. was established and a year later the CIBINTRA International Trading Co. Ltd. was founded.

On 21 December 1995, CIB was given the license to conduct commercial banking business by the State Banking Supervision.

=== National expansion (1992-2006) ===
In 1992 CIB Bank started to expand its branches with the foundation of the CIB Broker Co. Ltd. as a subsidiary of CIB Hungária Bank Rt. CIB Broker Co. Ltd., which later became CIB Securities Ltd. as the investment company of CIB Bank.

Since June 1993 the company is listed on the Budapest Stock Exchange.

CIB Securities has been licensed for securities trading since November 1994.

On 31 December 1996, the company was transformed to a joint stock company.

On 1 January 1998, Central-European International Bank Ltd. and CIB Hungária Bank Rt. were consolidated and named after the Central-European International Bank Ltd.

Until March 1999 the capital grew to HUF 4.4 billion.

By the end of 2006, the bank had 98 branches nationwide.

=== Present ===
In 2007 the parent company of CIB, Banca Intesa, merged with Sanpaolo IMI to Intesa Sanpaolo S.p.A.

In 2008 CIB Bank merged with Inter-Európa Bank and continued to operate as CIB Bank Ltd.

In April 2014 Pál Simák became chairman and CEO of CIB Bank. He was replaced by Luigi Fuzio in June 2026.

== See also ==
- List of banks in Hungary
