= Hungarian Industrial and Commercial Bank =

Short-lived bank based in Budapest

The Hungarian Industrial & Commercial Bank (Hungarian: Magyar Ipar-és Kereskedelmi Bank) was a significant albeit short-lived Hungarian bank with head office in Budapest. It was created in 1890 with sponsorship from Wiener Bankverein and additional participation by Deutsche Bank. It appointed István Tisza as its president, a position the future statesman kept until 1901. Count Gyula Andrássy the Younger and German financier Eugen Gutmann were among its high-profile board members.

Under Tisza's direction, the bank expanded rapidly but became overstretched, collapsing into bankruptcy in 1902 in part because of ill-timed investments in the Romanian petroleum industry.

== See also ==
- Hungarian Commercial Bank of Pest
- First National Savings Bank of Pest
- Hungarian Mortgage Credit Bank
- Hungarian General Credit Bank
- Hungarian Discount and Exchange Bank
- List of banks in Hungary
