= Ignác Alpár =

Hungarian architect

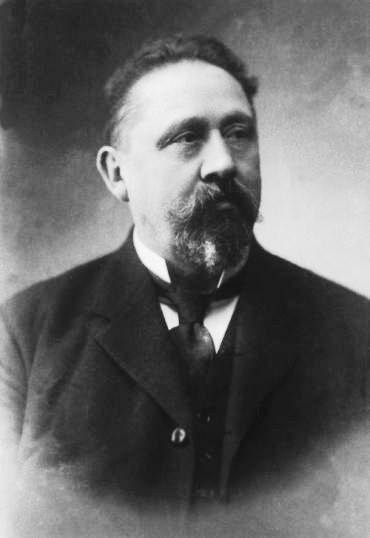
Ignác Alpár (ca.1905)

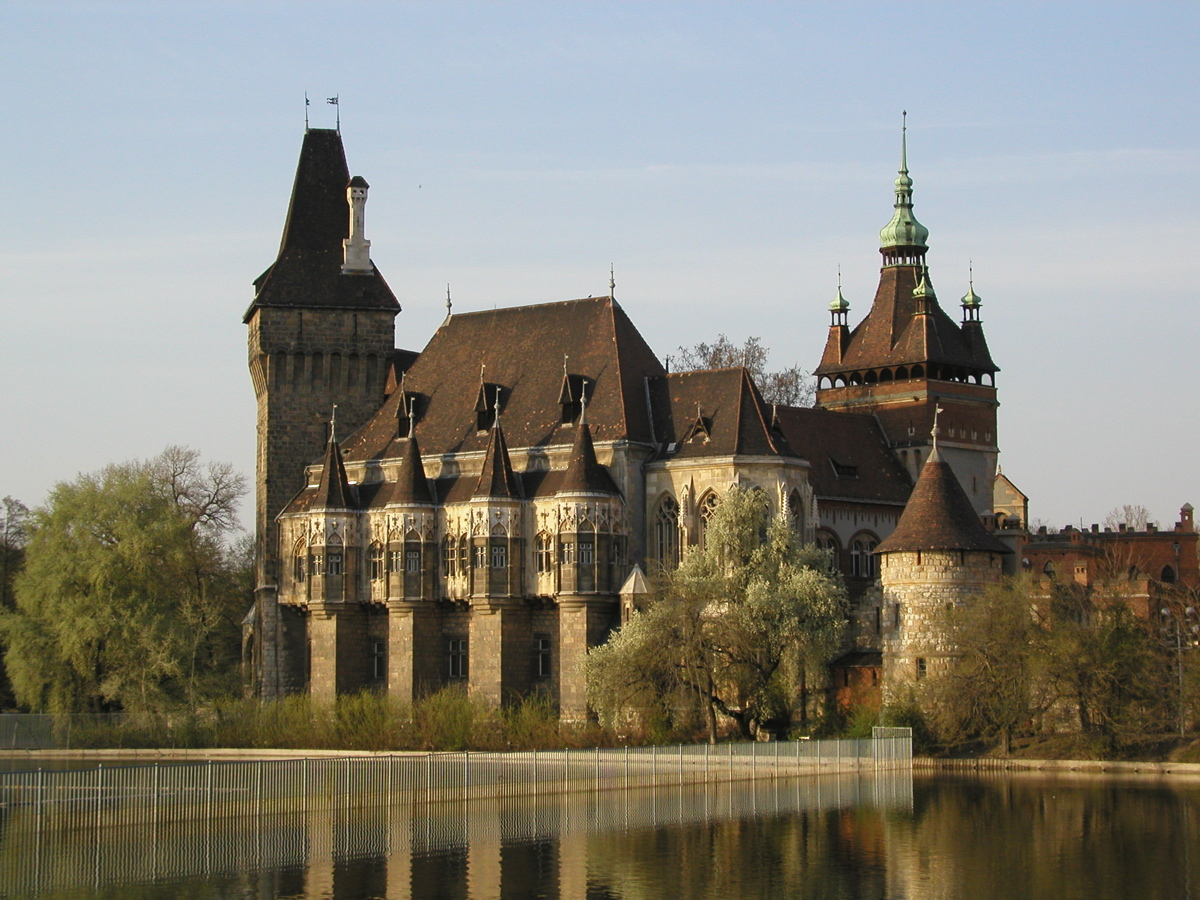
Vajdahunyad castle in Budapest

Ignác Alpár József (born Schöckl József; 17 January 1855 in Pest – 27 April 1928 in Zürich) was a Hungarian architect.

== Career ==
Alpár began his career as a stonemason, then worked under architect Alajos Hauszmann. After completing formal studies in Berlin, he returned to Budapest to work under Imre Steindl and Hauszmann again. He began independent practice in 1890, working mainly on public projects in a historicist, eclectic style. The most well known of these is the so-called Vajdahunyad Castle built for the millenary celebrations in 1896, which incorporated architectural styles practised in Hungary from the Middle Ages to the Baroque period.

== Buildings ==
- Town halls: Sighişoara, Cluj-Napoca, Deva, Nyíregyháza, etc.
- Colleges: Eötvös College
- Churches: Sighişoara Reformed Church, Braşov Reformed Church (demolished 1963)
- Baths: Băile Herculane
- Banks: Austro-Hungarian Bank, Budapest (1902–05); Hungarian Commercial Bank of Pest (long time functioned as the building of the Ministry of Home Affairs); Hungarian General Credit Bank (currently the building of the Ministry of Finance); First National Savings Bank of Pest (currently the building of the Treasury)
- Former Stock Exchange building, Budapest (long time housed the Hungarian National Television)
- Anker Palace, Budapest

== Legacy ==
- In 1958 the Ignác Alpár memorial prize was established by the Society of Architects, which is awarded annually for significant achievements in building.
- There is a statue of Alpár in front of the Vajdahunyad castle by Ede Telcs. He is depicted wearing the robes of a master architect from the Middle Ages.
