= Zsigmond Kornfeld =

Jewish banker

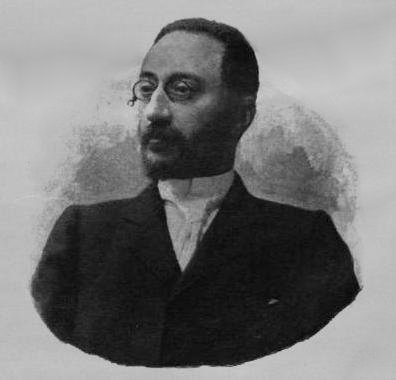
Zsigmond Kornfeld (1902)

Zsigmond Kornfeld (27 March 1852 – 24 March 1909) was a Bohemian-born Jewish Hungarian banker, economist, and baron.

== Life ==
Kornfeld was born on 27 March 1852 in Golčův Jeníkov, Bohemia, Austrian Empire. His uncle was Aharon Kornfeld, the last great head of a Bohemian Yeshiva.

Kornfeld left school when he was sixteen to work in the Torsch Bank House in Vienna. Following a short trip to Paris in 1872, he began working for the Böhmischer Bankverein in Prague. He was promoted to vice manager of the local branch of the Vienna Creditanstalt four years later. In 1878, Albert Rothschild appointed him to direct its partner institution, Hungarian General Credit Bank, in Budapest, Hungary. He became its managing director in 1900 and its president in 1905.

Kornfeld previously established close contacts with the Rothschild family while working in Vienna. In 1878, the Rothschilds rescued the Hungarian General Credit Bank from insolvency in addition to appointing Kornfeld as general manager. That year, he and the Rothschilds organized a 150 million crown loan for the all-but-bankrupt Hungarian state. In 1881, 1888, and 1892, he arranged the favorable conversion of Hungary's state debt, turning the Credit Bank into Hungary's de facto state bank. Under him, the bank became involved in railway, shipping, flour-milling, and sugar-milling enterprises as well as the development of the port of Fiume and the expansion of the Ganz Iron and Machinery Works.

In addition to debt conversions for Hungary in 1888 and 1892, Kornfeld managed a currency reform in 1894. In 1891, as a result of his bank's industrial prominence, he was appointed to the governing body of the Budapest Stock Exchange. In 1895, after manipulating the bank's dividend and creating an artificial panic, he was temporarily so unpopular he went on vacation abroad. He explained his actions as for the country's economic good, and his bank's industrial prominence made this excuse appear probable. He then returned to Budapest and came up with a plan to Magyarize the Stock Exchange, which until then conducted business in German. He was elected President of the Exchange on his reform platform.

Kornfeld helped put the Hungarian state on a sound basis, introduce the gold standard, secure gold reserves, and issue bonds. One company he helped found was the Hungarian River and Ocean Navigation Company, which controlled traffic on the Danube in Hungary until at least 1941. In 1902, Emperor Franz Joseph I appointed him to the House of Magnates. In 1909, the Emperor made him a member of the Hungarian nobility with the title of baron. A patron and collector of the arts, he purchased the Franklin Company, Hungary's main publishing house, and placed emphasis on genuine quality. In 1914, his maritime company named a steamship after him, although it was renamed Turán in 1914.

A practicing Jew, Kornfeld was vice-president of the Neologs and an active philanthropist. On the eve of the Russo-Japanese War, he negotiated a sizable loan for the Russian Empire on behalf of Austria-Hungary only to refuse a decoration the Russians offered him. He informed the Russian ambassador that while he conducted the negotiations as a banker at the request of his government, he wouldn't accept a mark of favor from a country that persecuted and massacred Jews as Russia did during the 1903 pogroms. He also refused any remuneration for his role in the transaction. In 1893, he became deputy president of the Budapest kehillah. He also supported the National Israelite Teachers' Union and built a synagogue on his estate in what later became Slovakia.

In 1879, Kornfeld married Betty Frankfurter (1858–1938) in Vienna. Their children were Gyorgy (1880–1901), Maria (1881–1939), Moric (1882–1967), Pal (1884–1958), and Ferenic (1897–1945). Pal succeeded his father as director of the Hungarian General Credit Bank, Moric was director of the machine factory and shipyard company Danubias, and Maria was married to the director of the Royal River and Ocean Ship Company Knight V. Domony.

Kornfeld died in Budapest on 24 March 1909. Hungarian Prime Minister Sándor Wekerle attended the funeral. Chief Cantor Professor Lazarus led the funeral service at the Bourse, with Chief Rabbi of Budapest Dr. Samuel Kohn, the vice-president of the Bourse, and a director of the Hungarian Credit Union Bank delivering eulogies.
