= Hungarian Discount and Exchange Bank =

Former Budapest-headquartered bank

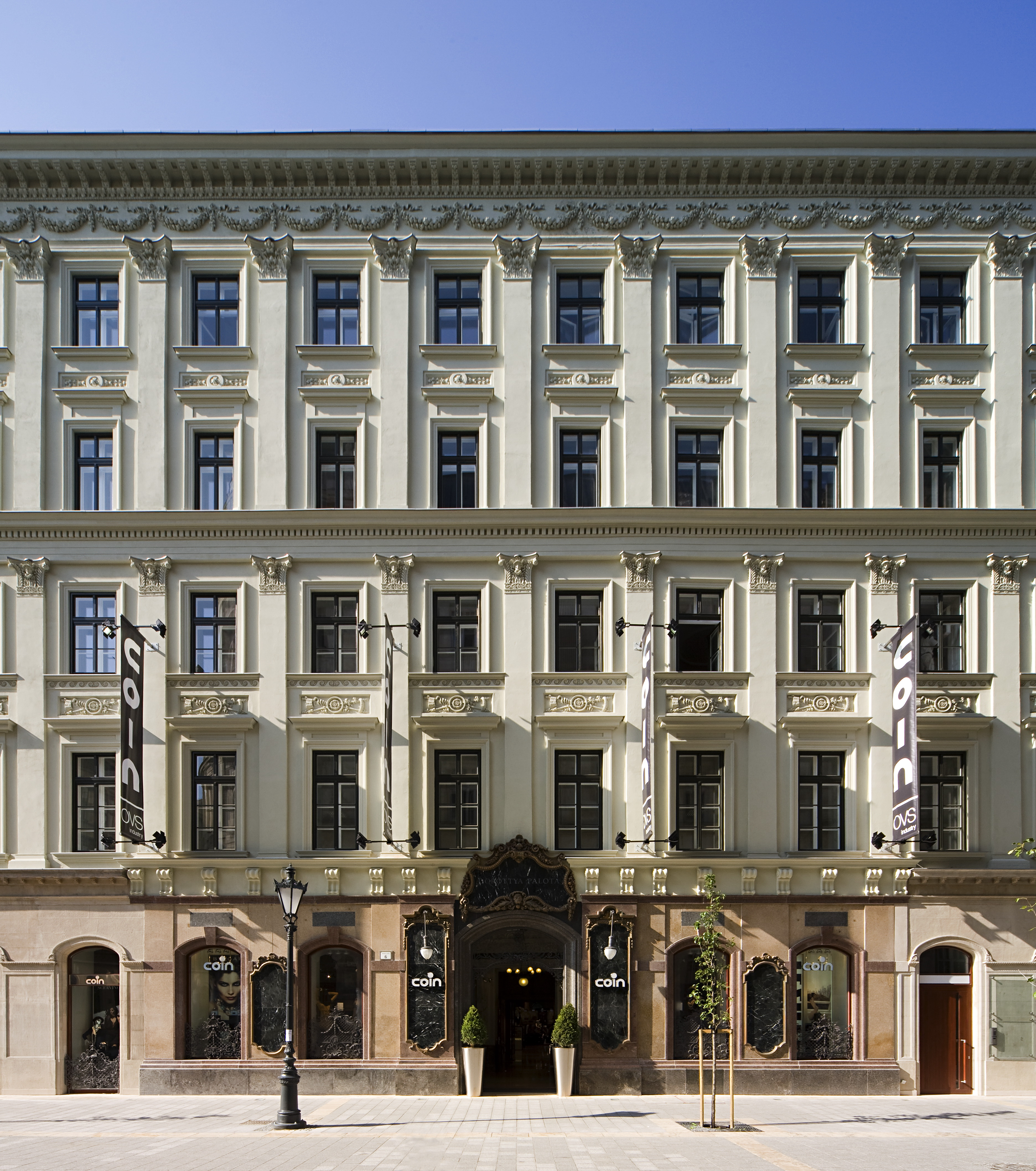
- Former Discount Bank head office, Dorottya utca 6 in central Budapest
- Company type: Private company
- Industry: Financial services
- Founded: 1869
- Defunct: 1947
- Fate: Nationalized
- Headquarters: Budapest, Hungary
- Area served: Hungary
- Products: Banking services, mortgages, merchant banking, government bonds

The Hungarian Discount and Exchange Bank (Hungarian: Magyar Leszámítoló és Pénzváltó Bank, MLPB, occasionally referred to simply as "Discount Bank") was a significant Hungarian bank, established in Budapest in 1869. It was nationalized in 1947–1949, together with the rest of the Hungarian banking sector.

== History ==
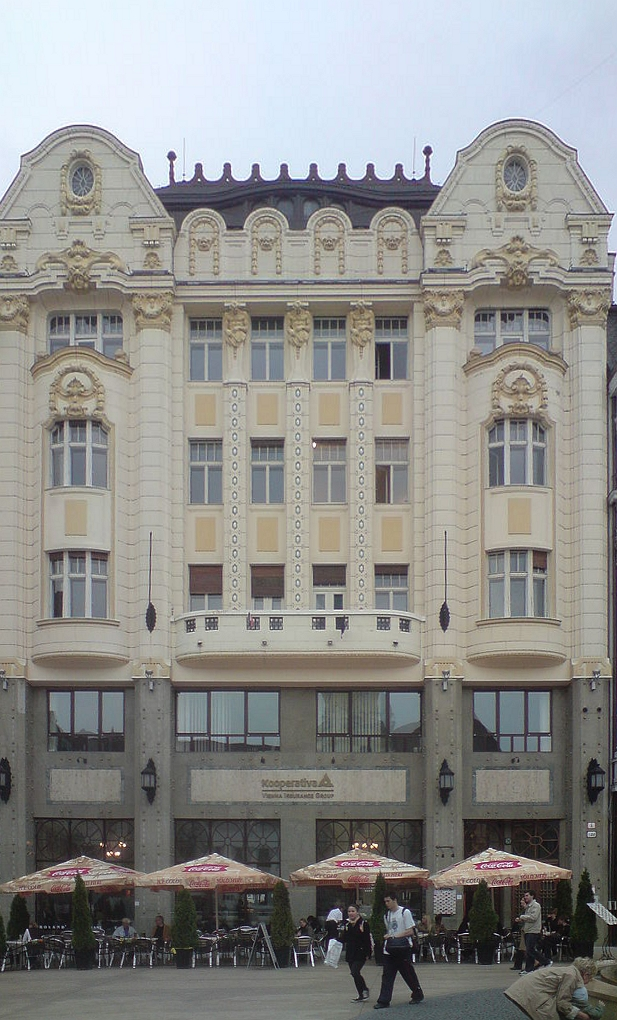
Former branch building in Bratislava

The MLPB was originally established as a Hungarian affiliate by the Vienna-based Niederösterreichische Escompte-Gesellschaft, which for that purpose took over the local private banking house of C.J. Malvieux.

In 1881, it received further investment from a group of investors formed by Vienna's Unionbank and France's Société Générale and Banque de Paris et des Pays-Bas. It expanded into merchant banking in the 1870s and took over several major warehouses in the 1880s. Like other Hungarian universal banks, it took ownership stakes in major utilities and industrial companies. It also participated in the issuance of loans by the Hungarian state and the city of Budapest. From 1902, it engaged in mortgage lending as well.

By 1913, it was the fifth-largest commercial bank in Hungary by total assets, behind the Hungarian Commercial Bank of Pest, the First National Savings Bank of Pest, the Hungarian Mortgage Credit Bank, and the Hungarian General Credit Bank. It remained among the country's leading banks during the interwar period, when it came under the control of Austria's then French-controlled Länderbank.

Miksa Madarassy-Beck was the bank's director in the late 19th century, while his brother Nándor Madarassy-Beck led the Hungarian Mortgage Credit Bank. Miksa's son Marcell Madarassy-Beck would also lead the bank in the interwar period, bohiernment and murder at the Mauthausen concentration camp in 1944.

== See also ==
- Austro-Hungarian Bank
- Hungarian National Bank
- List of banks in Hungary
