= Niederösterreichische Escompte-Gesellschaft =

Defunct Austrian bank

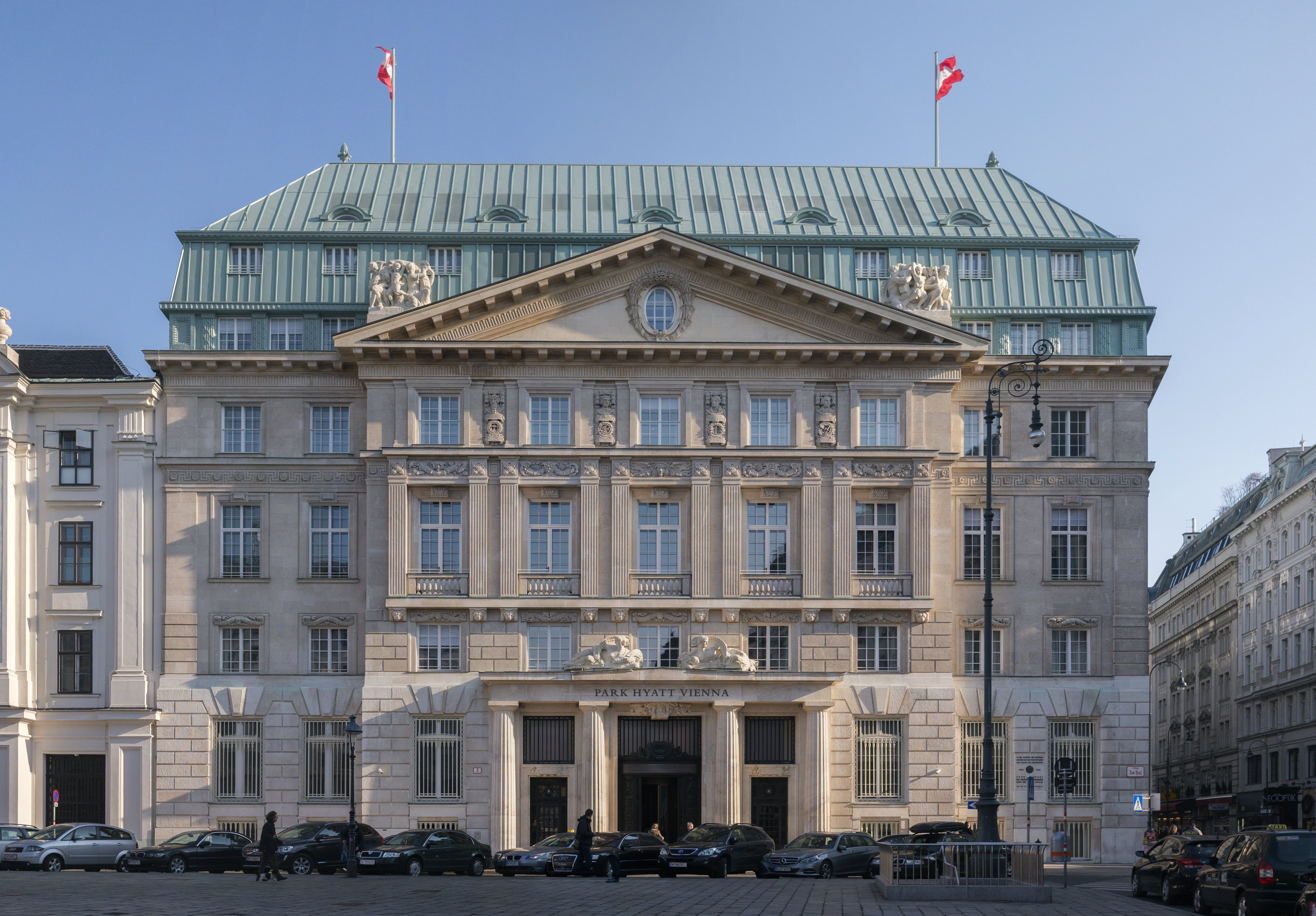
Former head office of the Niederösterreichische Escompte-Gesellschaft, Am Hof 2 in Vienna

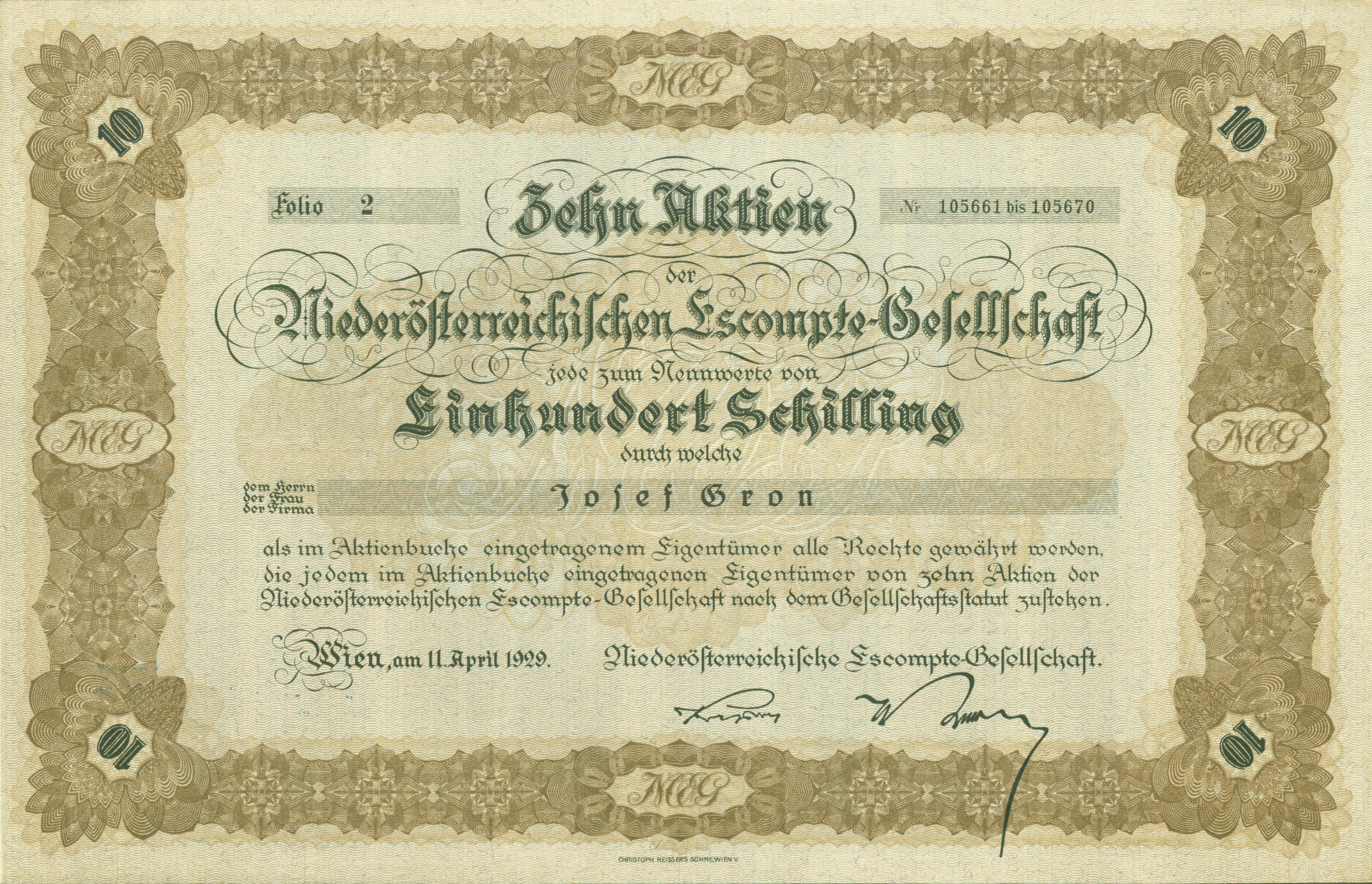
Share certificate of the Niederösterreichische Escompte-Gesellschaft, 1929

The Niederösterreichische Escompte-Gesellschaft or Niederösterreichischen Escomptegesellschaft (lit. 'Lower Austrian Discount Company') was a significant Austrian bank, created in Vienna in 1853. In 1934, the sounder parts of its business were merged with Creditanstalt and Wiener Bankverein to form Creditanstalt-Bankverein, a predecessor entity of Bank Austria (since 2005 part of UniCredit).

== History ==
The Niederösterreichische Escompte-Gesellschaft was formed in 1853 on the model of the Disconto-Gesellschaft established two years earlier in Berlin, and mainly served merchants and industrialists in Vienna and its surrounding region of Lower Austria. In 1863, it sponsored the creation of the Böhmische Escompte-Bank in Prague, of which it eventually took full ownership in 1901. In 1869, it sponsored the creation of the Hungarian Discount and Exchange Bank in Pest, developed from the former private banking house of C. J. Malvieux, which became one of the largest universal banks in Hungary. In a separate venture in 1895, the Niederösterreichische Escompte-Gesellschaft was a partner in the creation of the Hazai Bank by the First National Savings Bank of Pest. By 1910, it was one of the seven largest banks in Vienna.

Following World War I, in 1919 the Niederösterreichische Escompte-Gesellschaft had to sell the Böhmische Escompte-Bank to Prague-based Živnostenská banka under the newly established Czechoslovak government's policy of reducing foreign control of its banking system, or nostrification. In 1927, it took a 6 percent ownership stake in Bank Handlowy in Warsaw.

The Niederösterreichische Escompte-Gesellschaft was unable to survive the European banking crisis of 1931. In 1932, similarly as the Wiener Bankverein, it transferred a portfolio of problem assets to a government-owned vehicle, the Gesellschaft für Revision und Treuhandige Verwaltung and issued new shares to restore its capital base, but that transaction proved insufficient. In 1933, as part of the systemwide restructuring initiated by chancellor Engelbert Dollfuss, the Oesterreichische Nationalbank took over most of the bank's share capital through another recapitalization, which ultimately involved the transfer to the recapitalized Creditanstalt of its entire banking business on 31 December 1933. The remaining entity was renamed Industriekredit AG and remained under the control of the National Bank. It was eventually liquidated.

== Headquarters ==
The Niederösterreichischen Escompte-Gesellschaft originally purchased properties prominently located on Vienna's Freyung square, namely the houses Zum goldenen Straußen (Freyung 8) and Zum rothen Mandl (Freyung 9). It had a new building erected there in 1871 after tearing down the two houses.

In the early 1910s, it purchased a property on the nearby Am Hof square, number 2, that was the former location of Austria's Imperial War Council or Hofkriegsrat (known since 1848 as the Ministry of War), and before that of Vienna's Jesuit professed house of which the nearby Church am Hof remains. The Niederösterreichischen Escompte-Gesellschaft sold its Freyung property in 1914 to the Creditanstalt, which used to expand its own headquarters from across the Tiefer Graben street.

The new Niederösterreichischen Escompte-Gesellschaft head office building was designed by architects Ernst Gotthilf and Alexander Neumann and inaugurated in 1915. That team had just created the new headquarters of Wiener Bankverein at Schottentor, and were also working on the Creditanstalt's head office extension by the Freyung. By coincidence, therefore, the same architects had near-simultaneously designed the seats of the three large banks that merged in 1934, after which the merged Creditanstalt-Bankverein settled in the former Bankverein head office.

Following the 1934 merger, the former Niederösterreichischen Escompte-Gesellschaft building on am Hof 2 was purchased in 1938 at the occasion of the merger between Länderbank and Mercurbank, engineered by Mercurbank's owner Dresdner Bank following the Anschluss, and became the merged entity's head office. In 1991, it became the seat of newly formed Bank Austria after Länderbank merged with Vienna's Zentralsparkasse. In 1997, Bank Austria purchased Creditanstalt and eventually merged with it in 2002, subsequently moving into the former Creditanstalt-Bankverein head office building at Schottentor. Financier René Benko purchased the property on am Hof 2 in 2008 and repurposed it after renovation into a luxury hotel, despite a fire in 2011. The hotel opened in 2014 as Vienna's Park Hyatt.

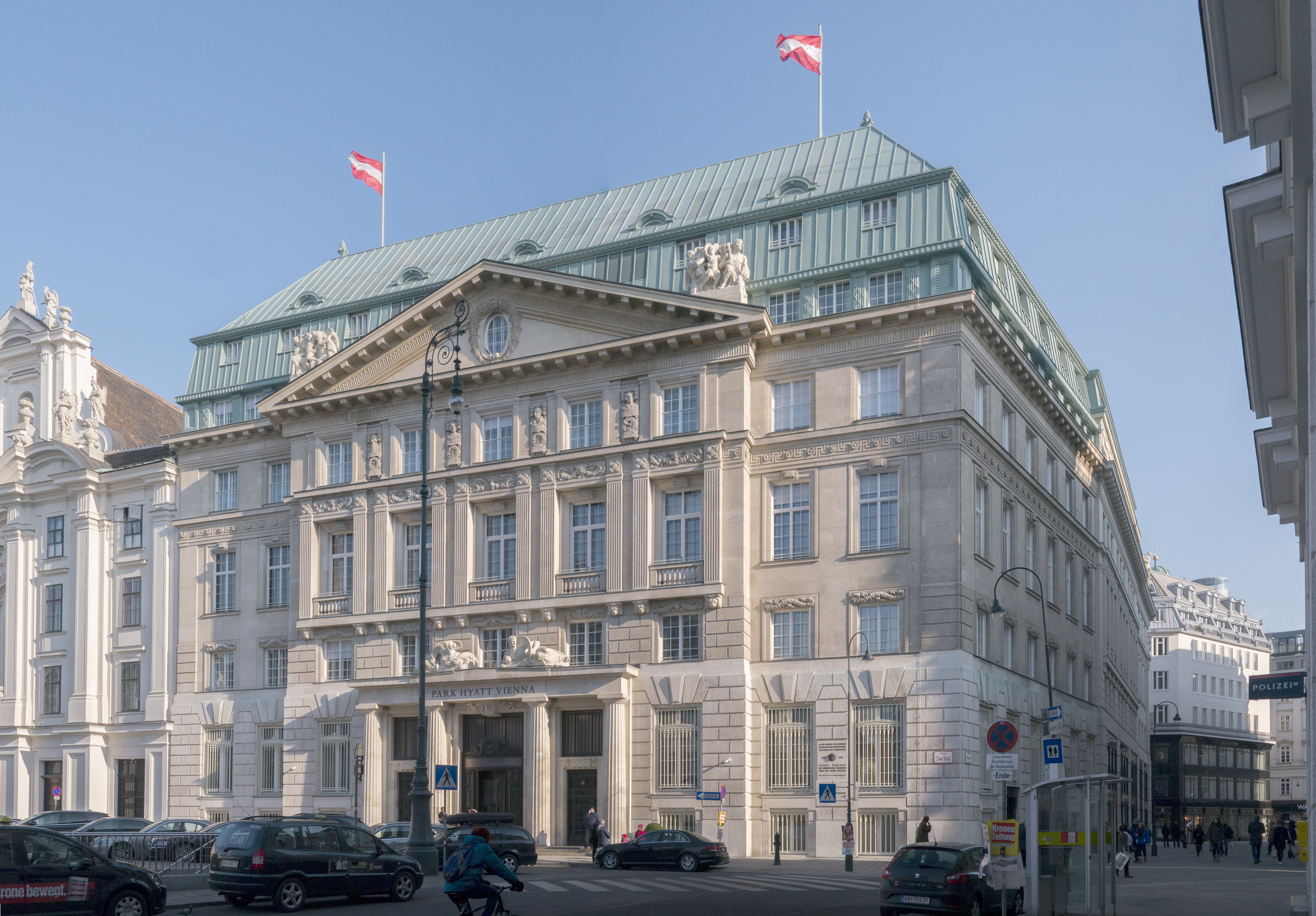
The building between the Church am Hof (left) and Bognergasse (right)

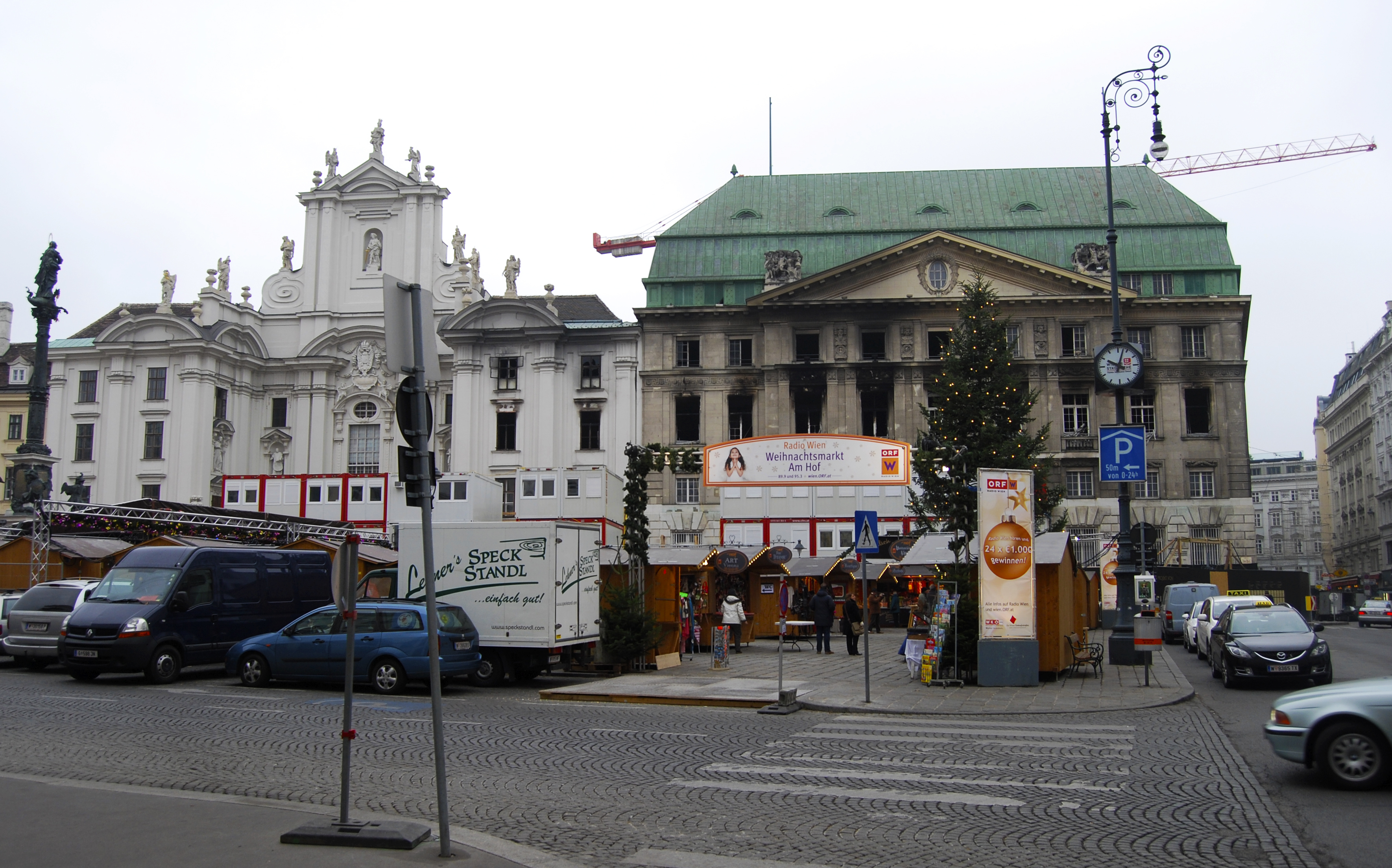
The building after fire in 2011

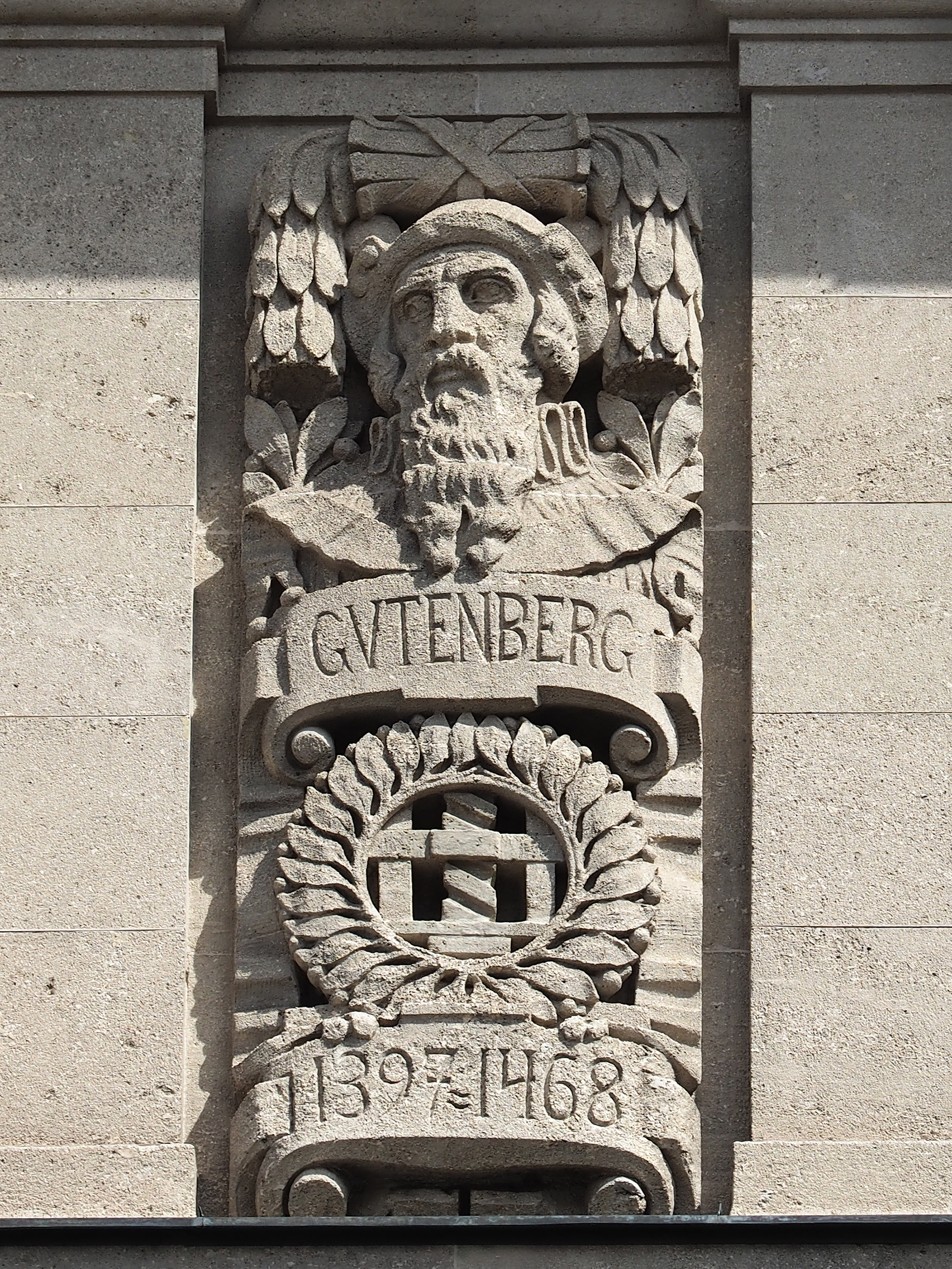
Sculpted portrait of Johannes Gutenberg

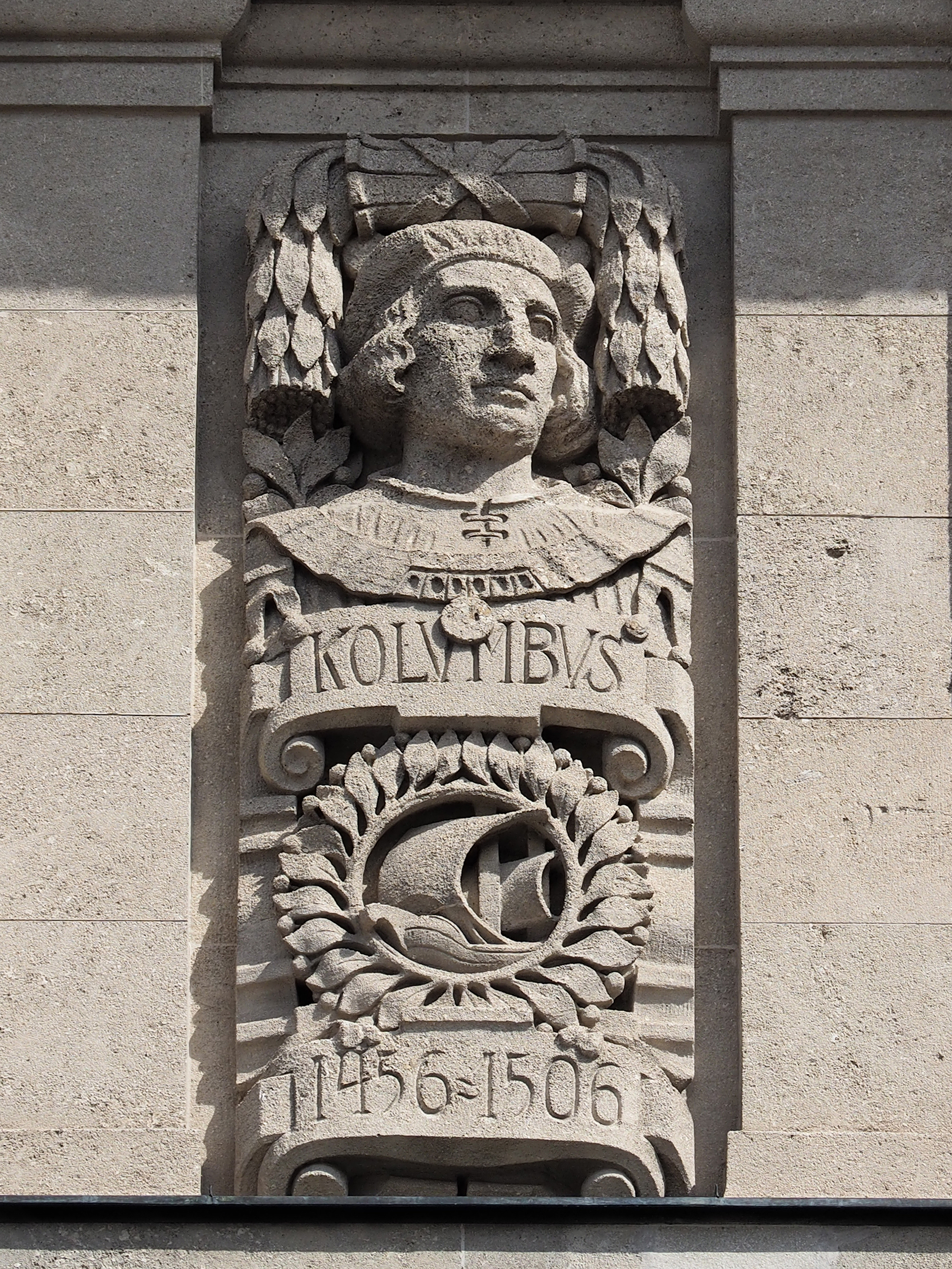
Sculpted portrait of Christopher Columbus

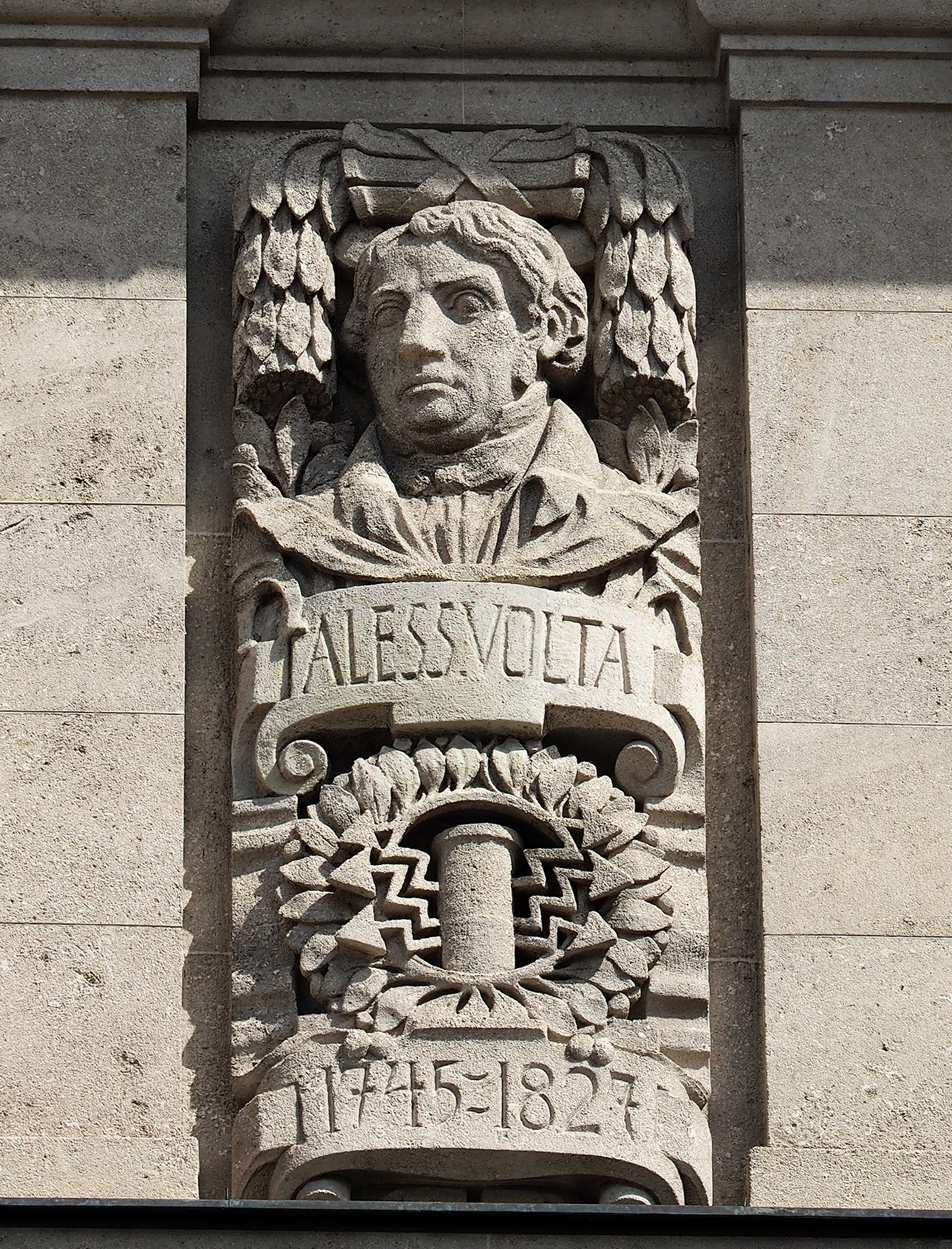
Sculpted portrait of Alessandro Volta

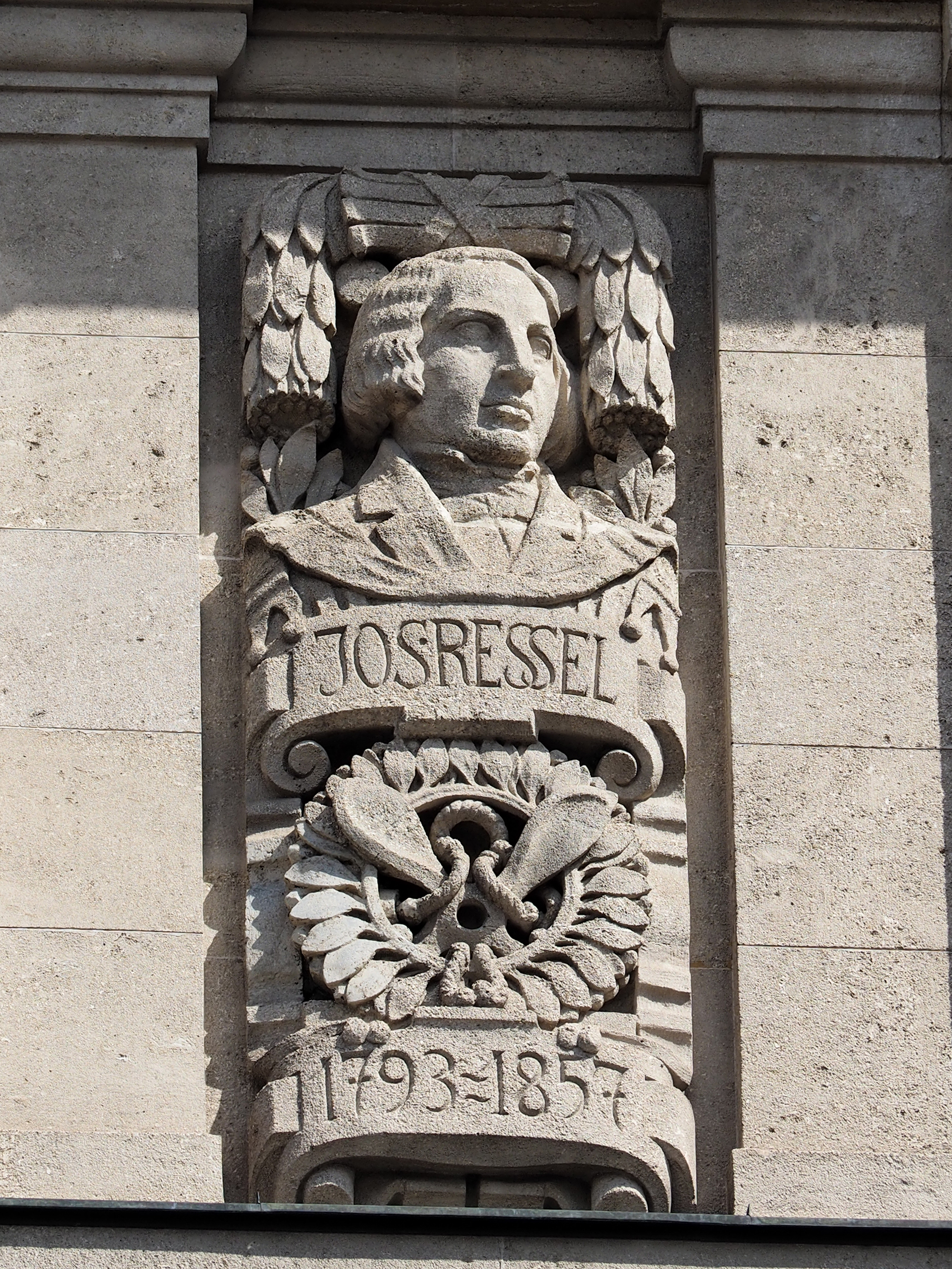
Sculpted portrait of Josef Ressel

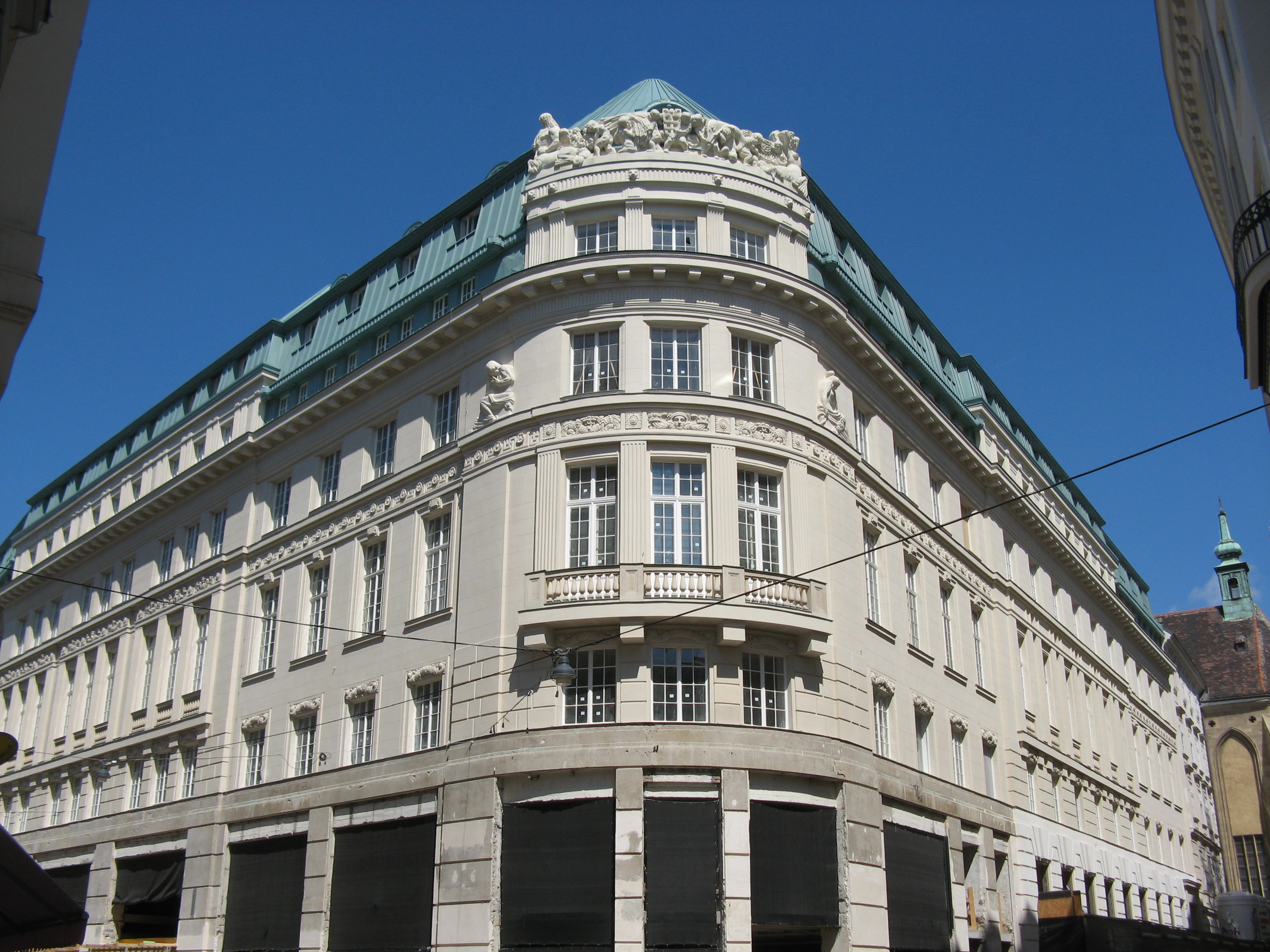
Rear façade, corner of Bognergasse and Seltzergasse

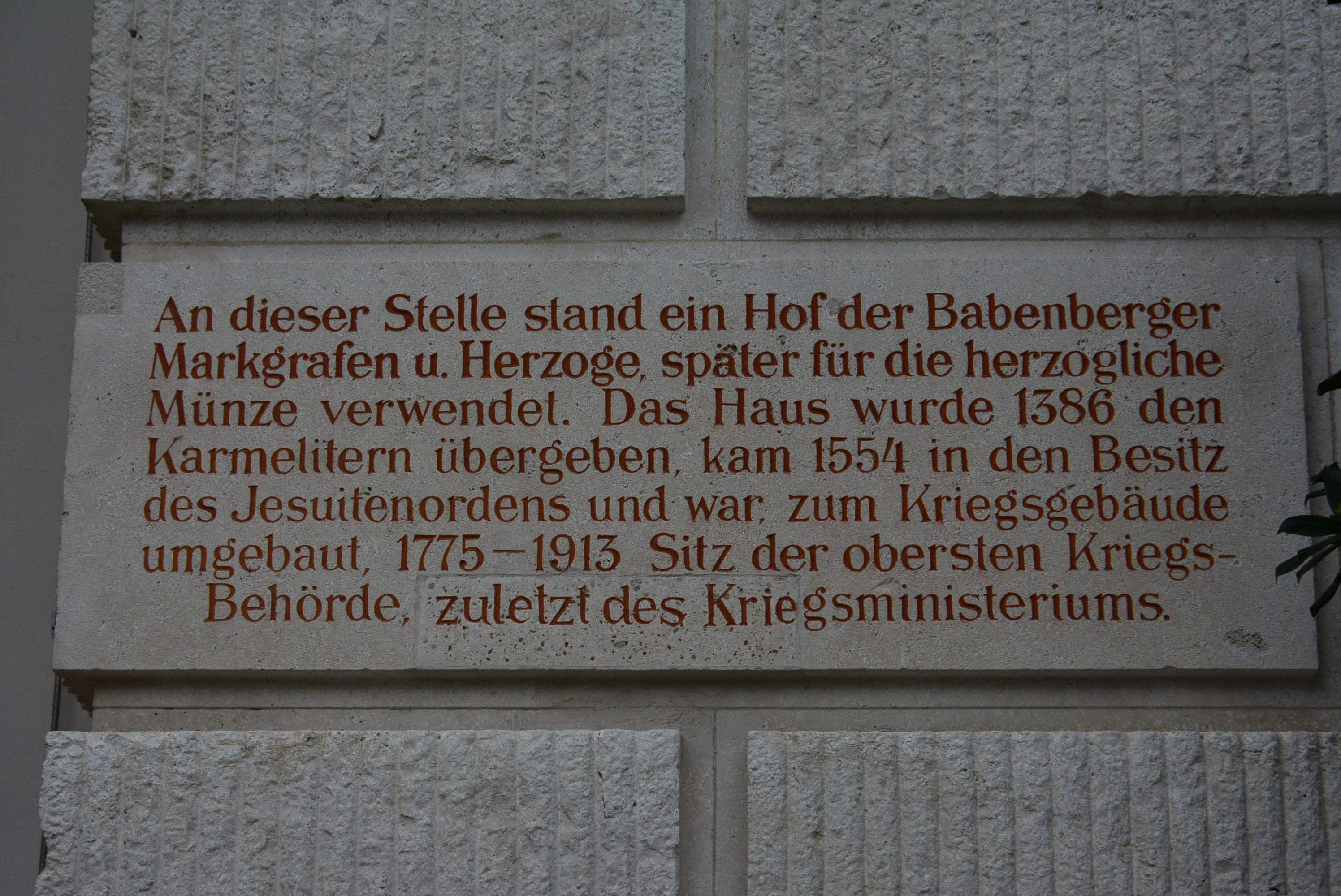
Plaque recalling the history of the site as Babenberg mansion, Carmelite convent, Jesuit professed house, and war council building

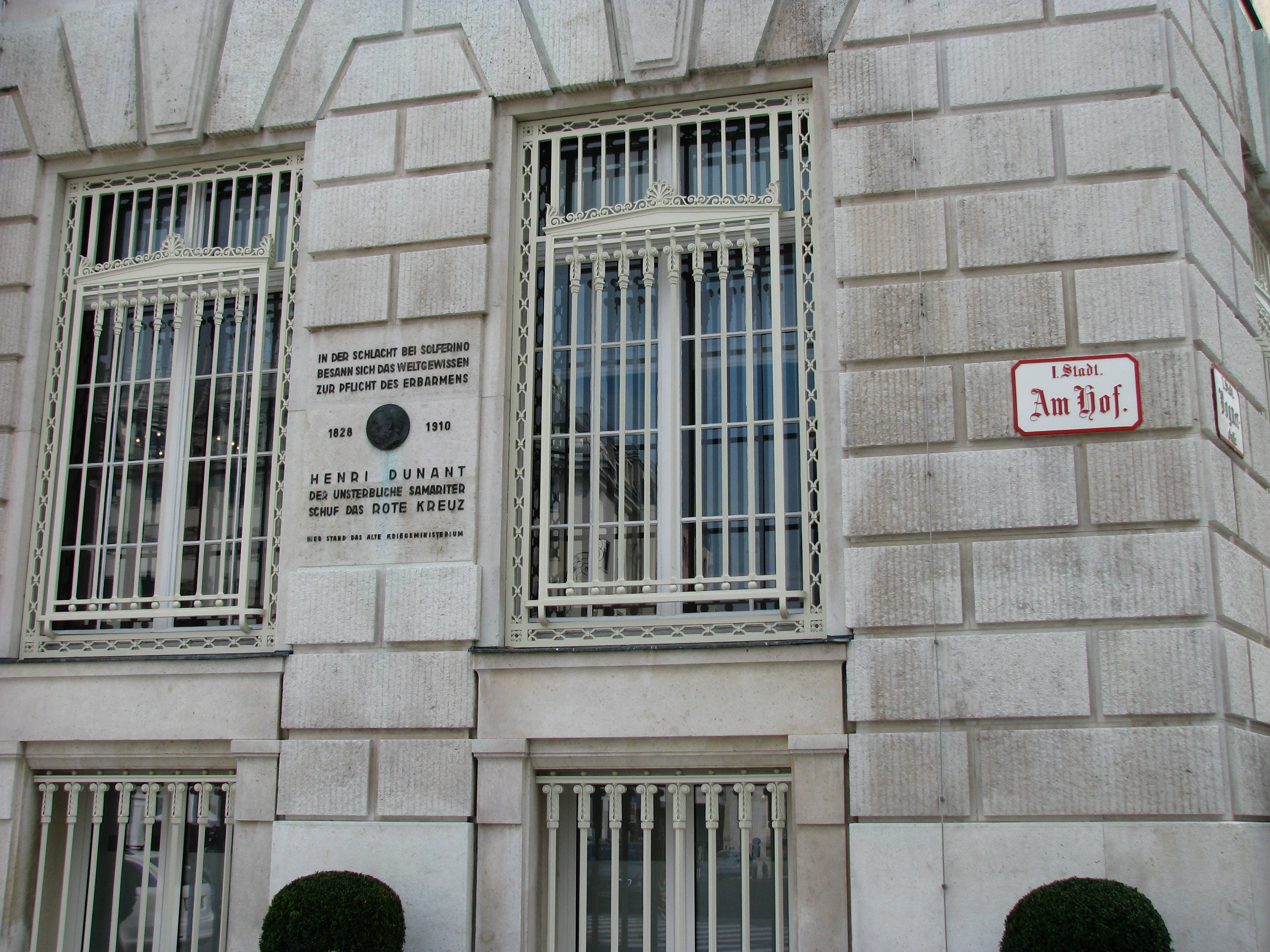
Plaque honoring Henri Dunant's role in the creation of the Red Cross, with reference to the 1859 Battle of Solferino

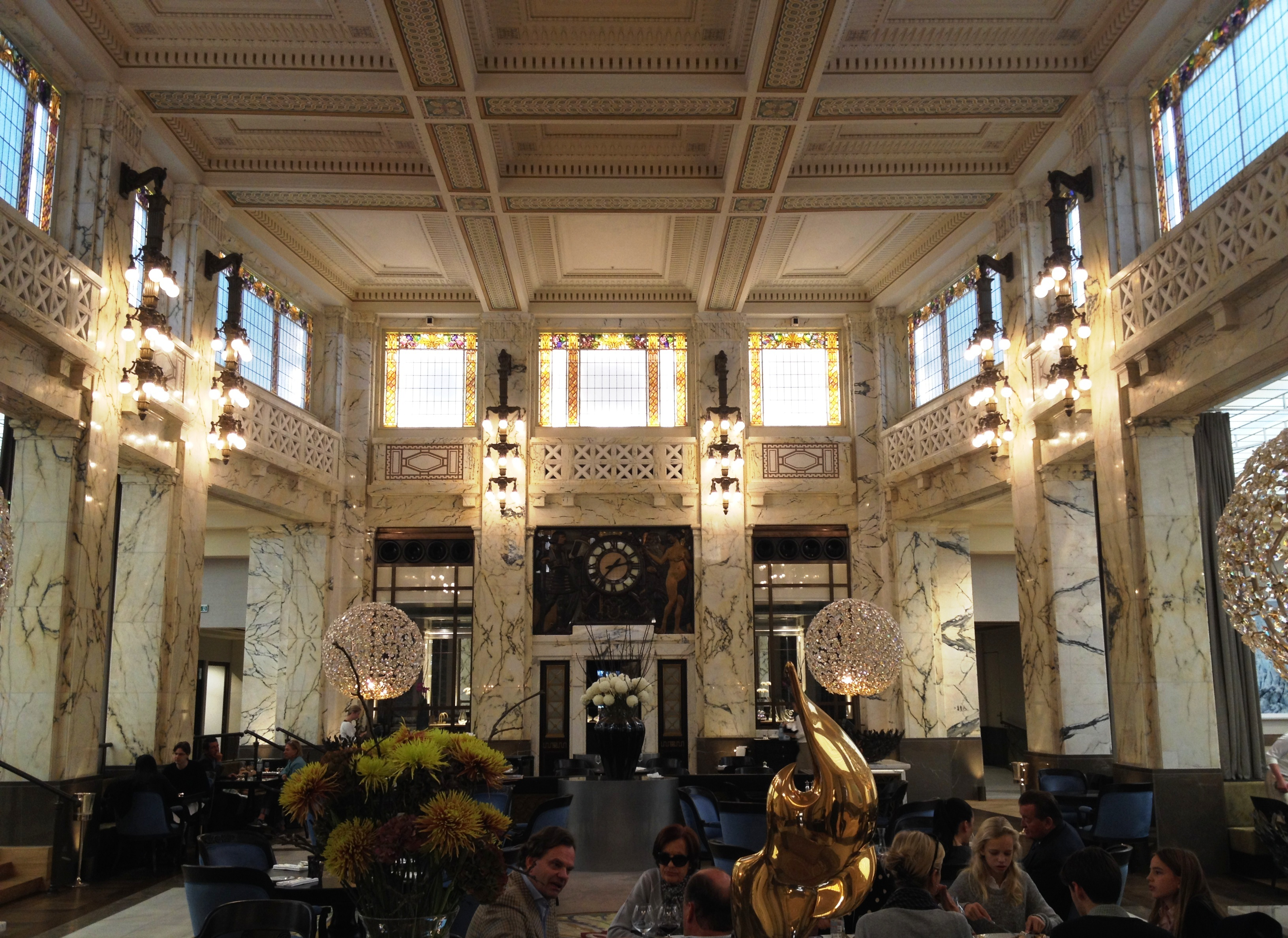
Main hall after renovation in 2014, repurposed as Bank Brasserie & Bar

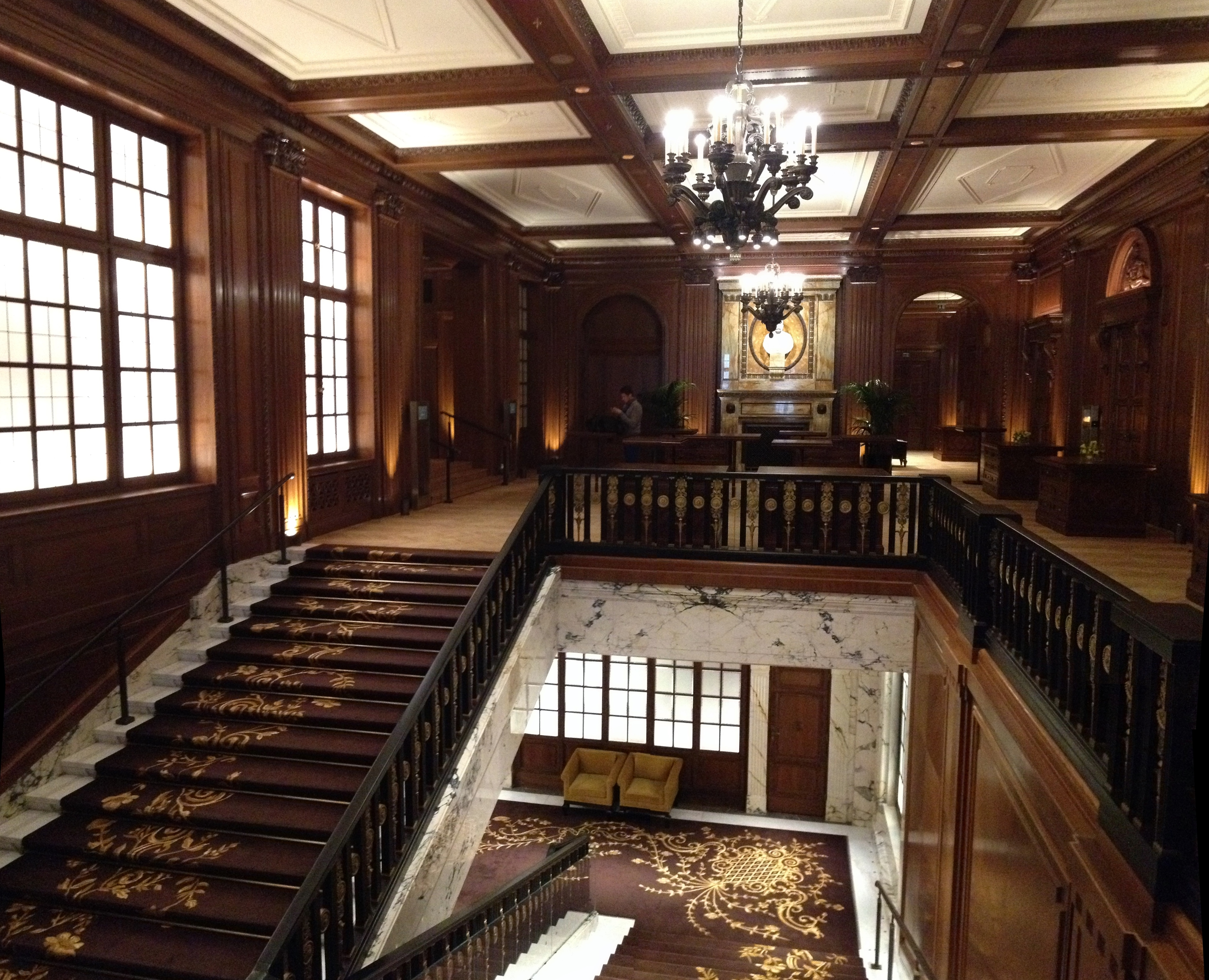
Grand staircase in 2014

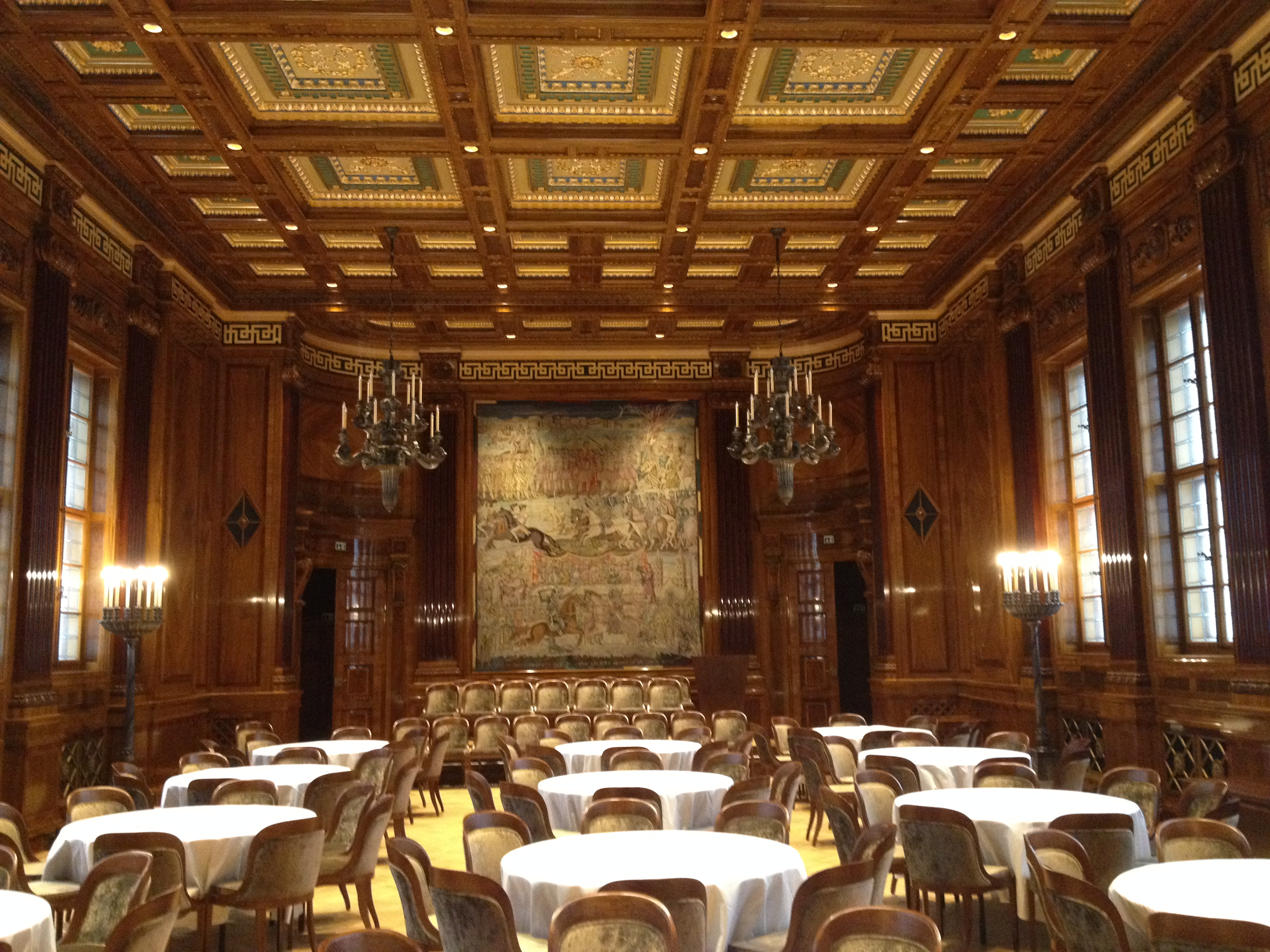
Former boardroom, repurposed as hotel dining room in 2014

== See also ==
- Anglo-Austrian Bank
- Länderbank
- List of banks in Austria
