= Hungarian Mortgage Credit Bank =

Former Hungarian bank

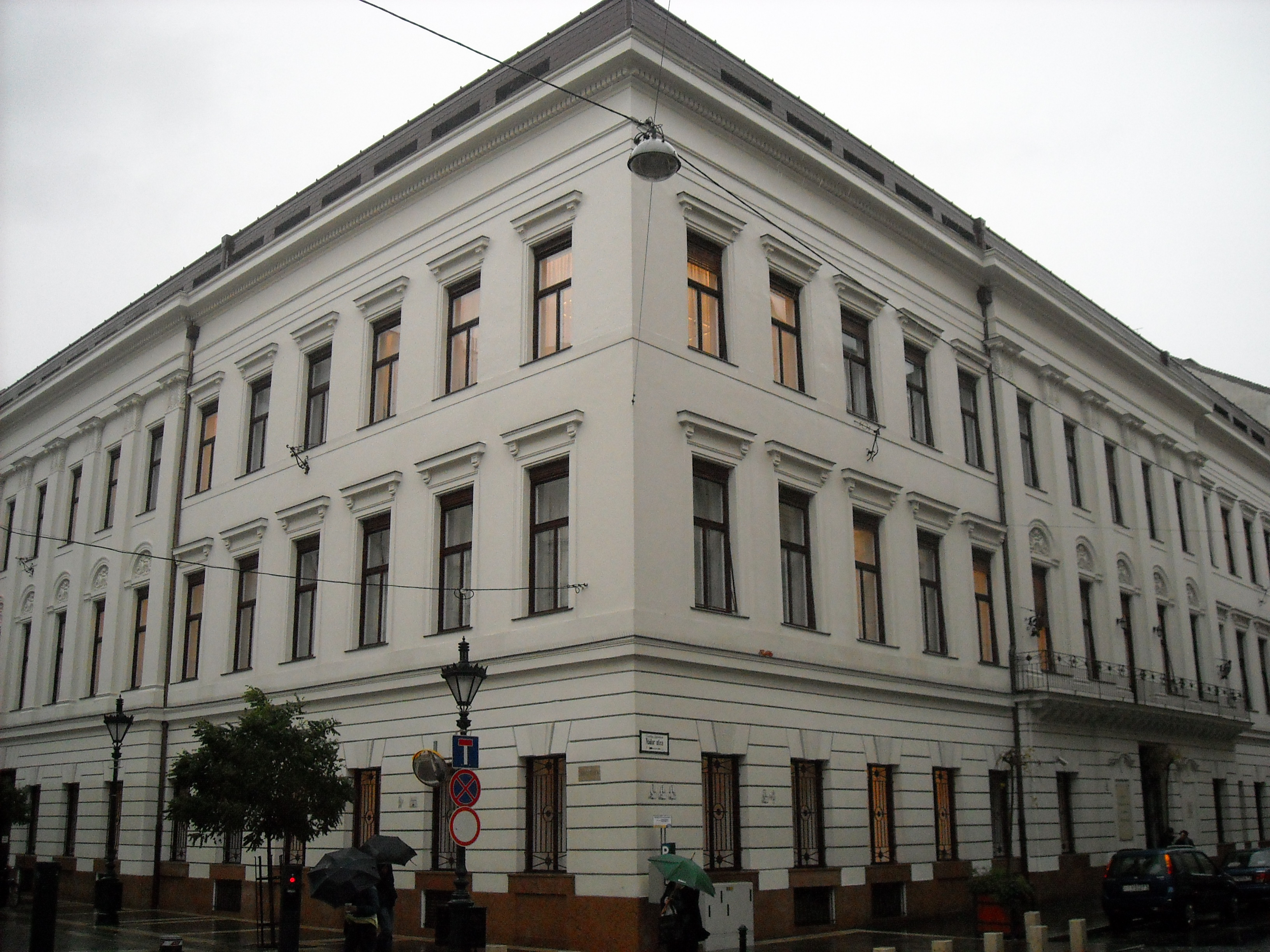
Former head office of the Mortgage Bank, Nador utca 7 in central Budapest

The Hungarian Mortgage Credit Bank (Hungarian: Magyar Jelzálog-Hitelbank, occasionally referred to simply as "Mortgage Bank") was a significant Hungarian bank, founded in 1869 in Budapest. By 1913 it was the third-largest bank in the country by total assets, behind the Hungarian Commercial Bank of Pest and the First National Savings Bank of Pest. It was nationalized in 1947–1949, together with the rest of the Hungarian banking sector.

In 1881, it received further investment from a group of investors formed by Vienna's Unionbank and France's Société Générale and Banque de Paris et des Pays-Bas. The bank was long led by Hungarian statesman Kálmán Széll.

The Mortgage Bank remained among the country's leading banks during the interwar period. Its chairman and CEO from 1918 to 1925 was Gyula Madarassy-Beck. Its managing director from 1937 to 1944 was Imre Oltványi, who would become governor of the Hungarian National Bank in the immediate postwar era.

== See also ==
- Austro-Hungarian Bank
- Hungarian National Bank
- Hungarian General Credit Bank
- Hungarian Discount and Exchange Bank
- List of banks in Hungary
