= First National Savings Bank of Pest =

Historically prominent bank in Hungary

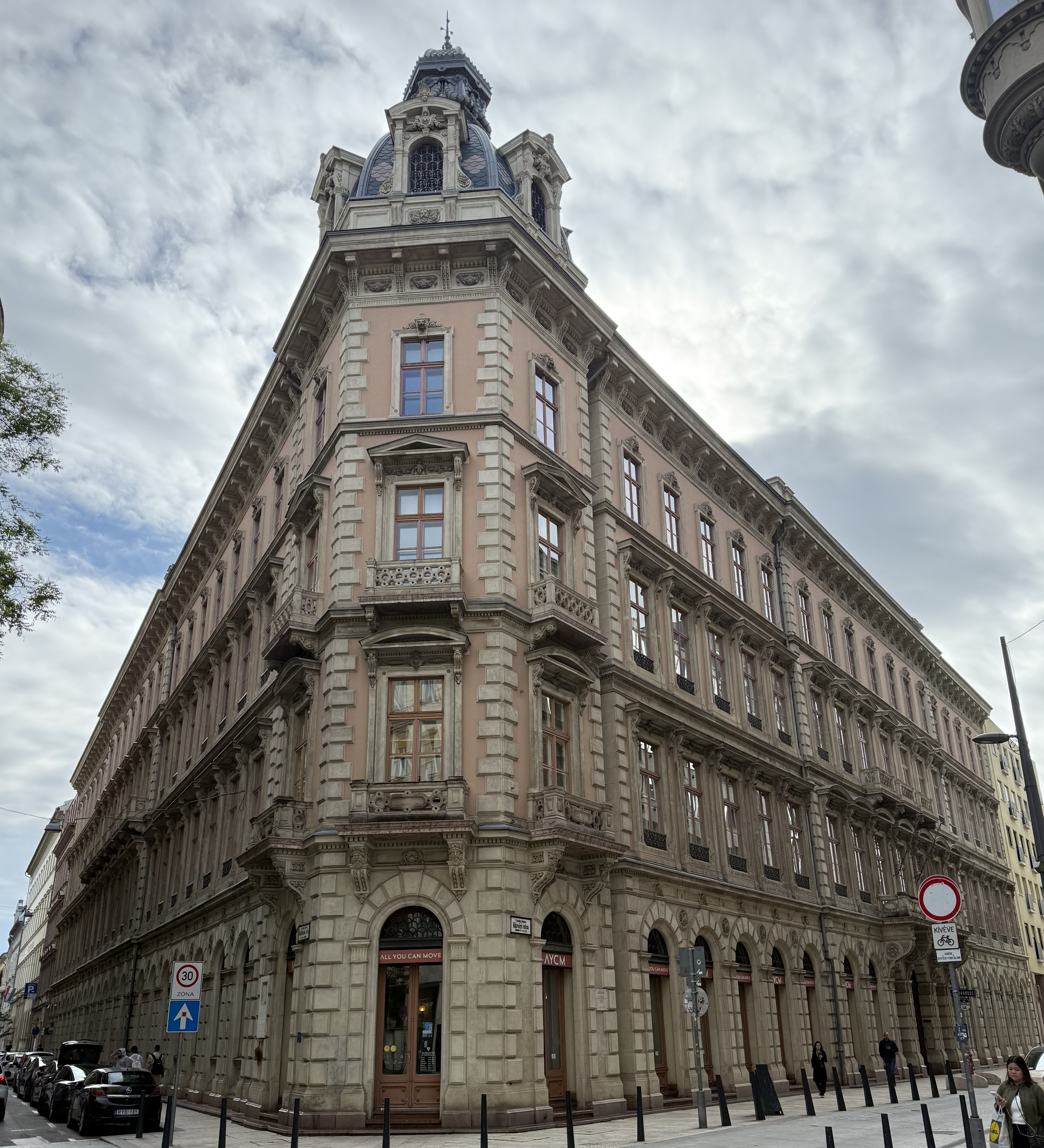
- Former head office of the First Savings Bank, designed by Miklós Ybl and completed in 1869
- Native name: Pesti Hazai Első Takarékpénztár
- Company type: Joint-stock company
- Industry: Financial services
- Founded: 1839
- Defunct: 1948
- Fate: Nationalised
- Headquarters: Pest, Hungary
- Area served: Hungary
- Products: Banking services

The First National Savings Bank of Pest (PHET) (Hungarian: Pesti Hazai Első Takarékpénztár), sometimes translated as First Domestic Savings Bank or referred to simply as First Savings Bank, was a major Hungarian bank that was established in 1839–1840 and was eventually nationalized in 1948, together with its universal banking affiliate Hazai Bank, established in 1895.

It was one of the three largest banks in Hungary in the late 19th and early 20th centuries, together with the Hungarian Commercial Bank of Pest and the Hungarian General Credit Bank.

== History ==
=== Creation and early development ===
The decision to create the First Savings Bank was made by the Pest municipal authorities in 1839, following advocacy by prominent local figures such as András Fáy. It started operations on 11 January 1840, initially in two small rooms of Pest County Hall. Lajos Kossuth and István Széchenyi were among its 326 original backers.

In 1844 it was converted from an association to a joint-stock company. In 1868, it expanded by opening branches in Pest. By 1913, it was Hungary's second-largest bank by total assets, surpassed only by the Hungarian Commercial Bank of Pest. It remained among the country's leading banks during the interwar period.

=== Hazai Bank ===
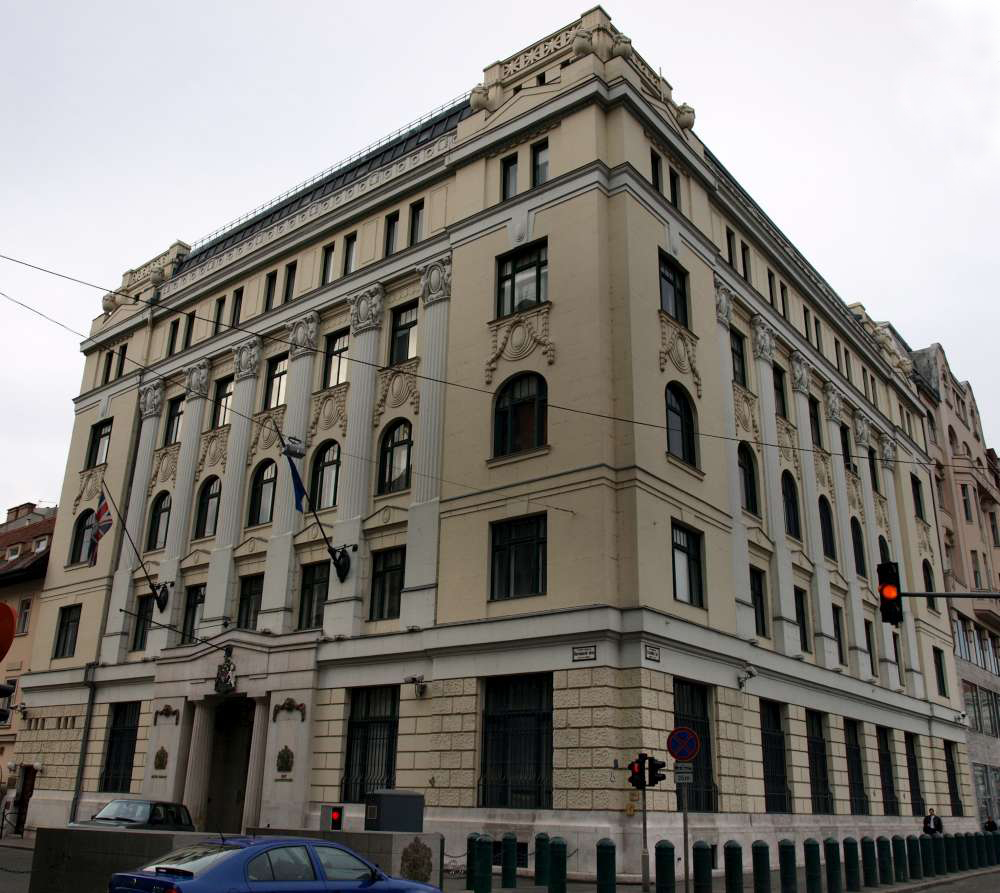
Former building of Hazai Bank in Budapest, designed in 1911 by architect Károly Rainer and inaugurated in 1914; later the British Embassy from 1948 to 2017

In 1892, the First Savings Bank initiated work to create an investment banking affiliate through which it would take stakes in major Hungarian companies, on the Crédit Mobilier template already espoused by Hungary's top two banks of the time, the Hungarian Commercial Bank of Pest and Hungarian General Credit Bank. The First Savings Bank eventually partnered with Vienna's Niederösterreichische Escompte-Gesellschaft in 1895 to establish the Hazai Bank (lit. 'Home Bank', sometimes alternatively translated as 'Domestic Bank' or 'Inland Bank'), which developed into a significant universal banking operation. It eventually merged into its parent in 1946.

=== Legacy ===
The First Savings Bank and its affiliate Hazai Bank were nationalized in 1948 together with the rest of the Hungarian banking industry. Within the communist-era single-tier banking system, its operations were taken over in 1949 by the Hungarian National Savings Bank Company (Hungarian: Országos Takarékpénztár Nemzeti Vállalat), one of the country's four main financial institutions alongside the Hungarian National Bank, the Hungarian Investment Bank (renamed the State Bank for Development in 1972 and liquidated in 1987), and the Hungarian Foreign Trade Bank. That entity became OTP Bank following the end of communism in Hungary.

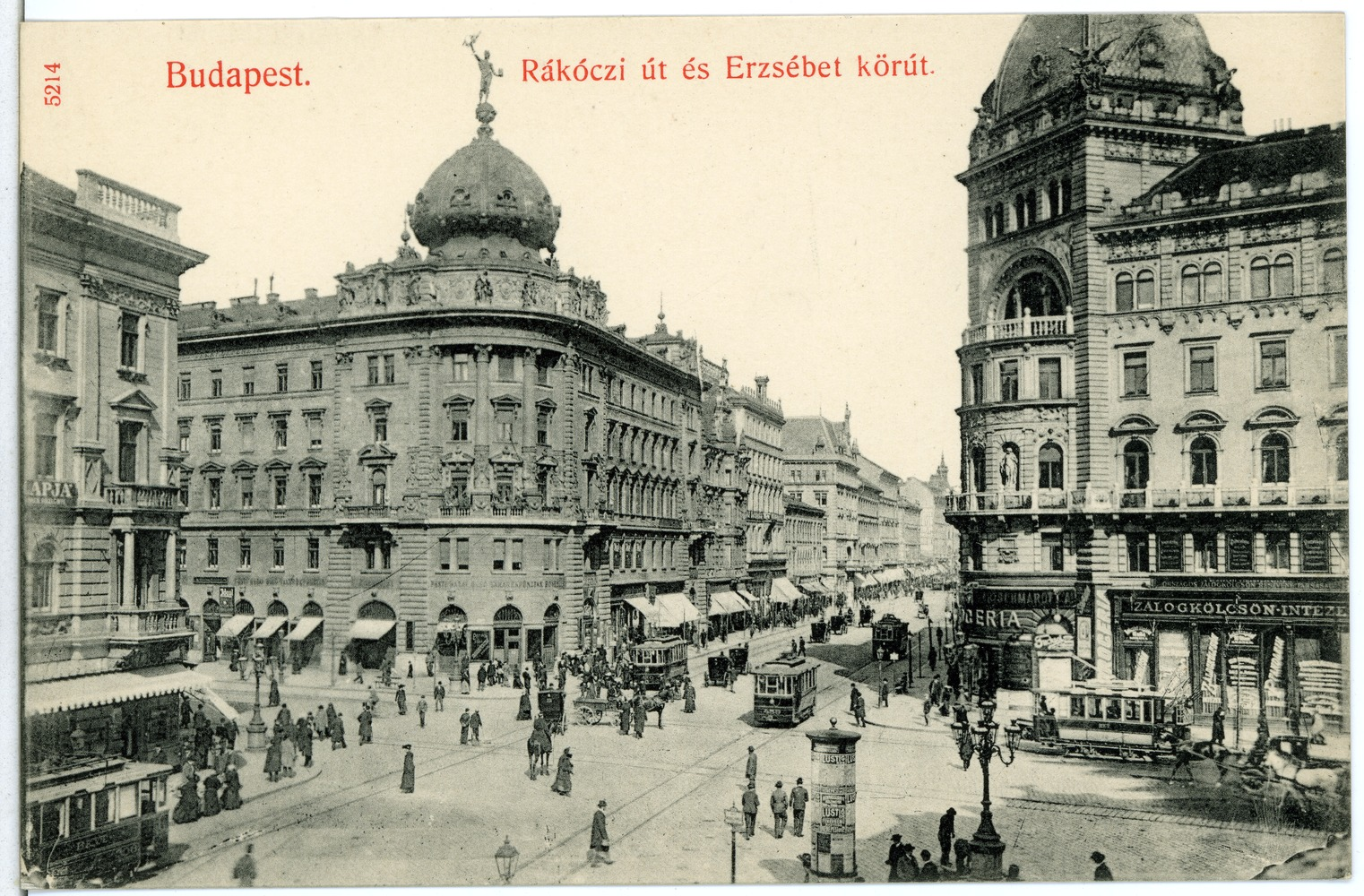
Former branch building at Erzsébet Boulevard 1–3, Budapest, photographed in 1904

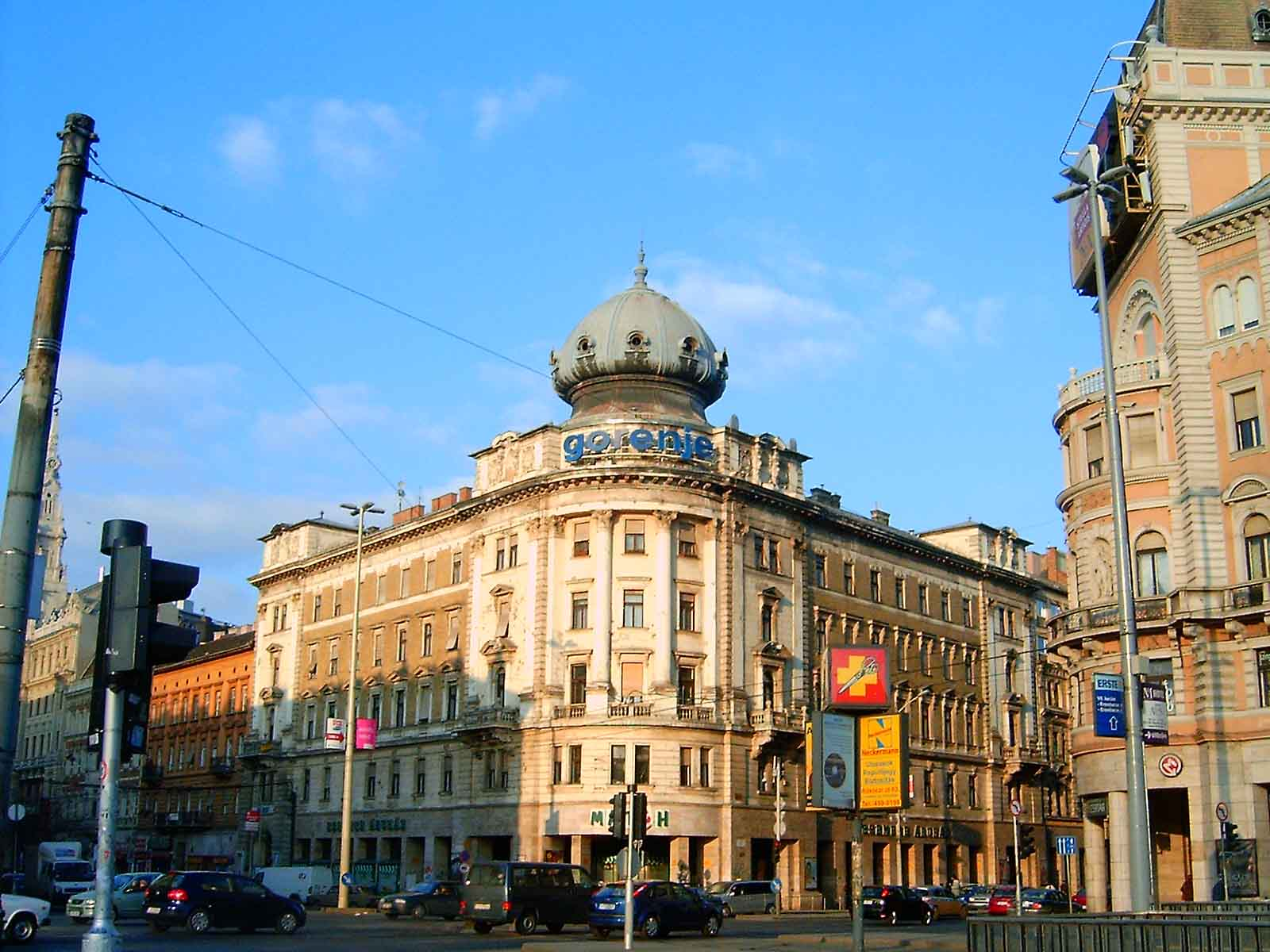
The same building in 2008

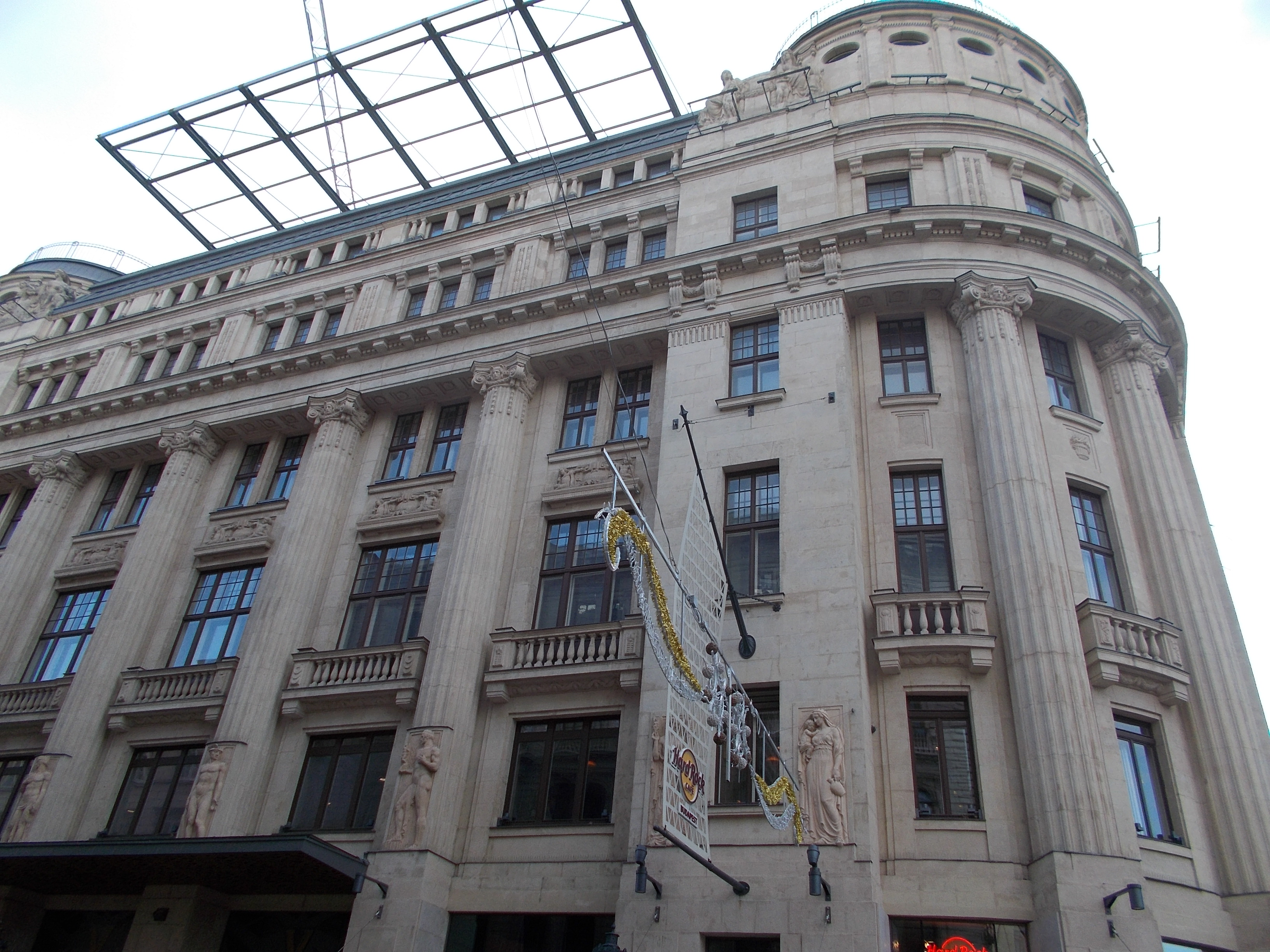
Former branch at Váci Street 1–3, Budapest, designed by Ignác Alpár

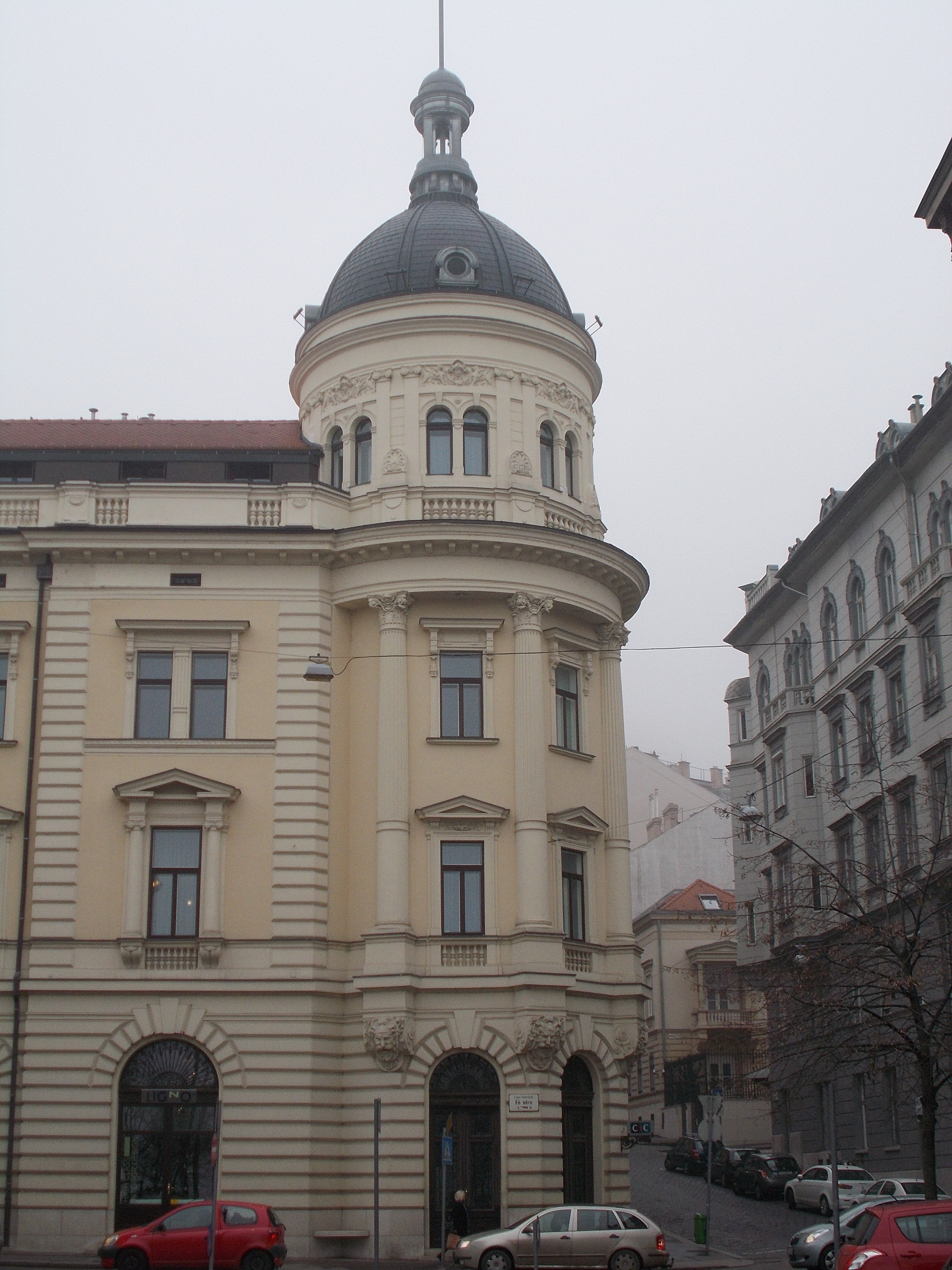
Former branch at Fő Street 10, Budapest

== See also ==
- Hungarian Mortgage Credit Bank
- Hungarian Discount and Exchange Bank
- Hungarian Postal Savings Bank
- First Croatian Savings Bank
- List of banks in Hungary
