= Hungarian Commercial Bank of Pest =

Historically prominent bank in Hungary

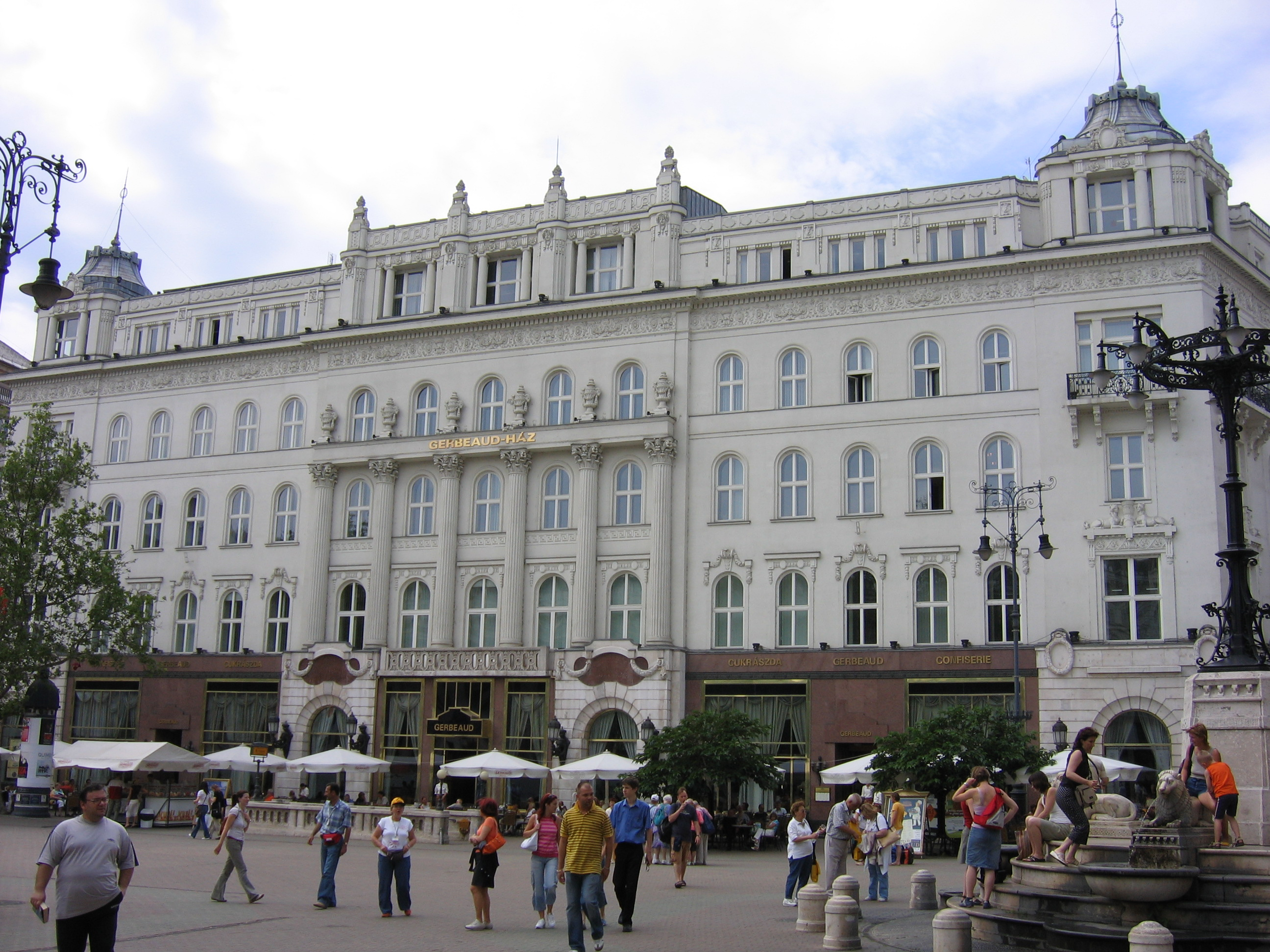
Hungarian Commercial Bank of Pest's first head office (until 1905) on Vörösmarty tér; the top floor is a later addition

The Hungarian Commercial Bank of Pest (Hungarian: Pesti Magyar Kereskedelmi Bank, PMKB, occasionally referred to simply as "Commercial Bank") was Hungary's first modern bank, established in 1840–1841. It was nationalized in the early Communist era and repurposed in 1950 as the Hungarian Trade Bank (Hungarian: Magyar Külkereskedelmi Bank, MKB), later known as MKB Bank.

== History ==
=== Beginnings ===
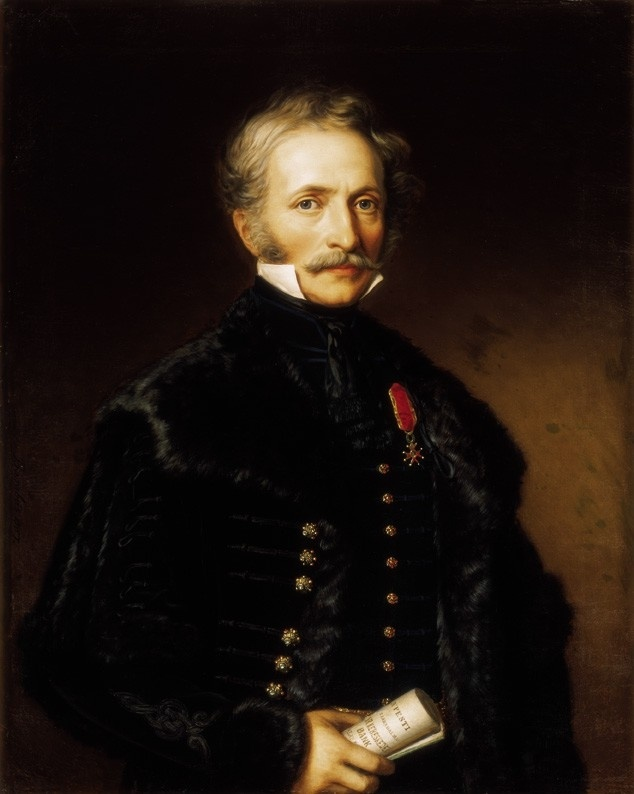
Móric Ullmann (1782-1847)

In 1830, a group of prominent merchants in Pest, including Jewish traders such as Sámuel Wodianer and Izrael Baumgarten, gathered under the leadership of Móric Ullmann and applied for the establishment of a commercial bank. One of the arguments was that the Austrian National Bank had not used its rights to open bank branches in the cities of Hungary; it was emphasized that the new institution would not abridge the rights of the Austrian National Bank. Following a very protracted approval process, the requested patent was eventually granted in 1838, and after further obstacles the bank was eventually established on 14 October 1840, in a building later known for the iconic Café Gerbeaud.

The Hungarian Commercial Bank of Pest is thus often referred to as the oldest Hungarian bank, even though a savings bank was established in 1831 in present-day Brașov, at the time part of Hungary. The bank started operations in 1841, including discount, giro, deposit and loan transactions. Shortly after its establishment, it supported the central railway company (Budapest-Vác-Szob line) and a number of manufacturing ventures.

=== Hungarian revolution and aftermath ===
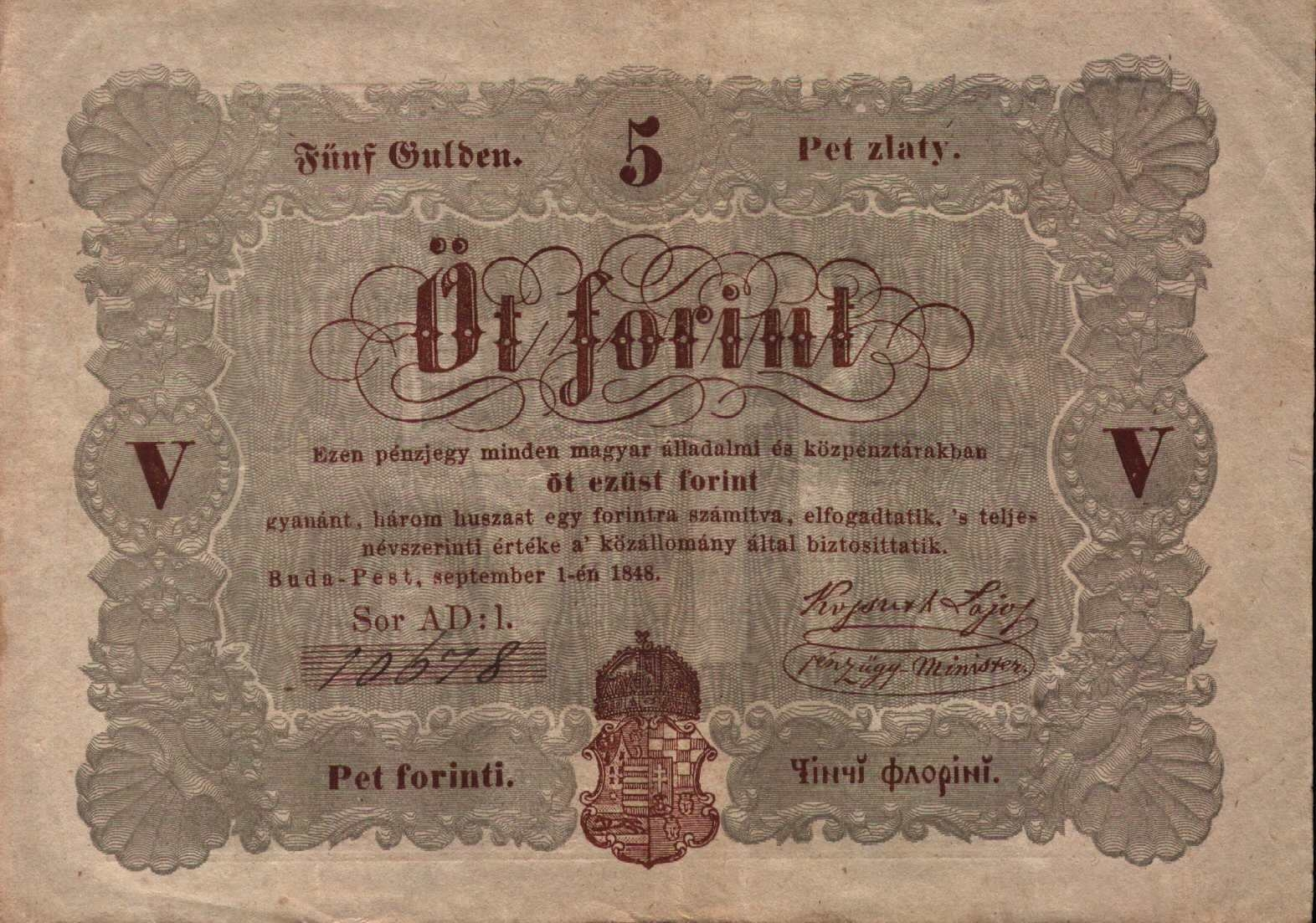
Kossuth banknote

On 17 June 1848, under the leadership of József Havas, the bank entered into a contract with the Hungarian state (with Minister of Finance Lajos Kossuth), according to which the Hungarian government deposited five million forints with the bank in real gold and silver, in exchange for which the financial institution was granted the role to issue notes which became known as "Kossuth's banknotes". The state then took five million forints from the issued banknotes, while one million forints was loaned without interest and 21.5 million forints at 3% interest. In exchange for the money, the Commercial Bank was obliged to perform the banknote management, issuance and redemption without any special remuneration, and it was also obliged to invest the entire mutual amount in short-term domestic loans in order to support the domestic business sectors (with sufficient collateral). On 12 September 1848, the parliament also decided to put five-forint tickets into circulation, despite opposition from the Vienna government on the grounds that they do not comply with the Austro-Hungarian financial contracts. Banknotes were issued and covered on this basis until the end of 1848, when the bank had 3,377,220 forint notes in circulation against the cover of 1,695,718.48 pengő forints. After the hostilities began, Kossuth also decided to issue 100 forint banknotes in order to quickly equip his armed forces.

On 31 December 1848, Alfred I, Prince of Windisch-Grätz marching on Pest demanded from the bank an accurate account of the coinage and the issue of notes. After occupying the capital, he immediately declared the 5 HUF and 100 HUF notes invalid, and set an 8-day deadline for converting the one and two HUF notes into Austrian banknotes. On 6 April 1849, he seized the then-available metal reserves of 1,780,718 conventional forints, and took them with him when the Austrian troops retreated. This seriously shook the bank financially, which nevertheless managed to stay afloat. Despite the withdrawal of the collateral, the Kossuth banknotes did not lose value immediately.

After the revolution's end, the Austrian authorities obliged the bank to pay compensation for to its loans to the revolutionary government. In 1850, the Austrian National Bank called for the Hungarian Commercial Bank to cease its activities on the grounds that it planned to open a branch of its own in Pest. In the unfolding debate, the Hungarian Commercial Bank prevailed and was able to continue its activities, while the Austrian National Bank opened its office in Pest in 1851 but entrusted its management to the Hungarian Commercial Bank. Until the Austro-Hungarian Compromise of 1867, the Hungarian Commercial Bank practically had no competitors in Hungary, while the Austrian National Bank's branch mainly served Austrians.

=== 1867-1918 ===
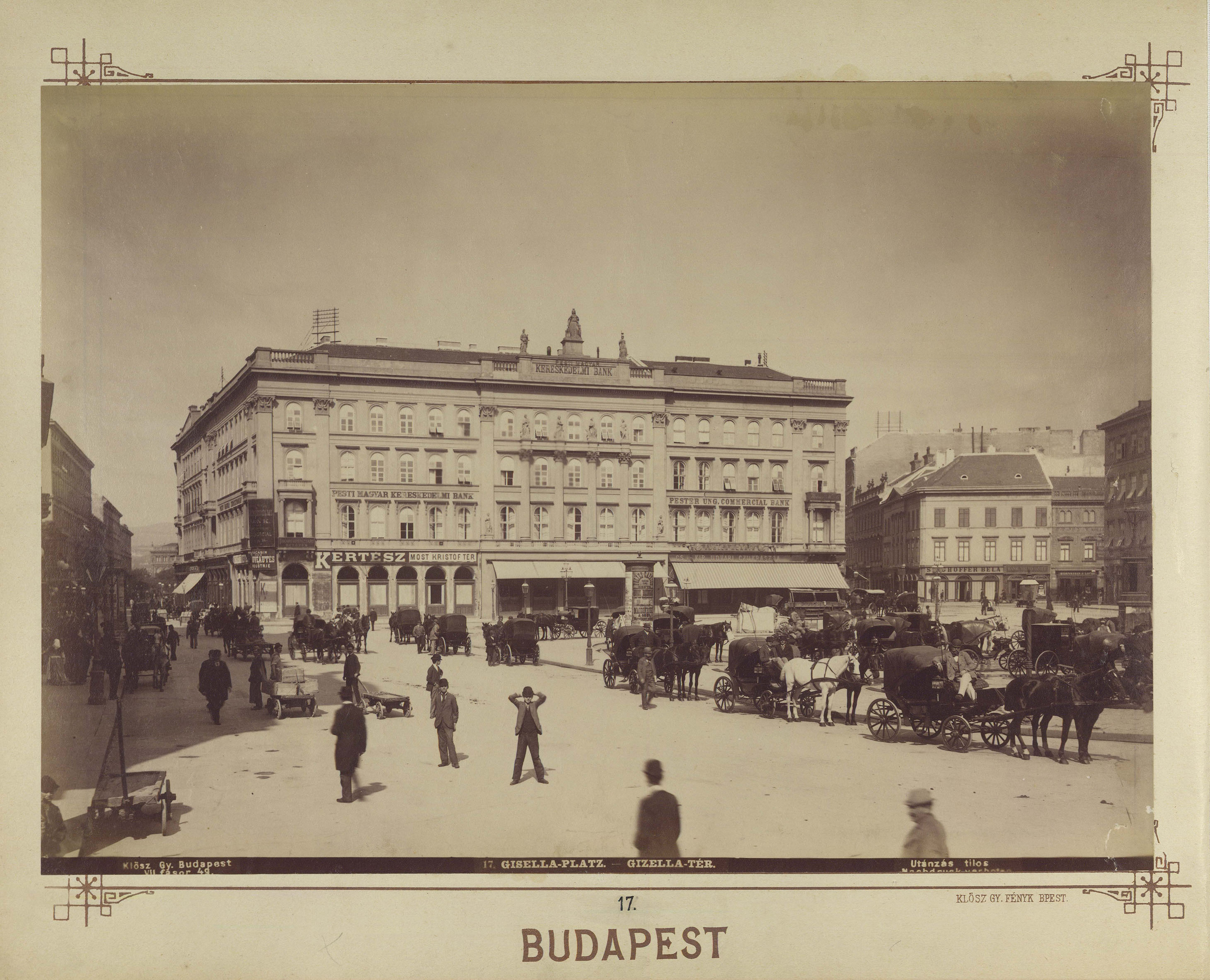
PMKB head office in 1900

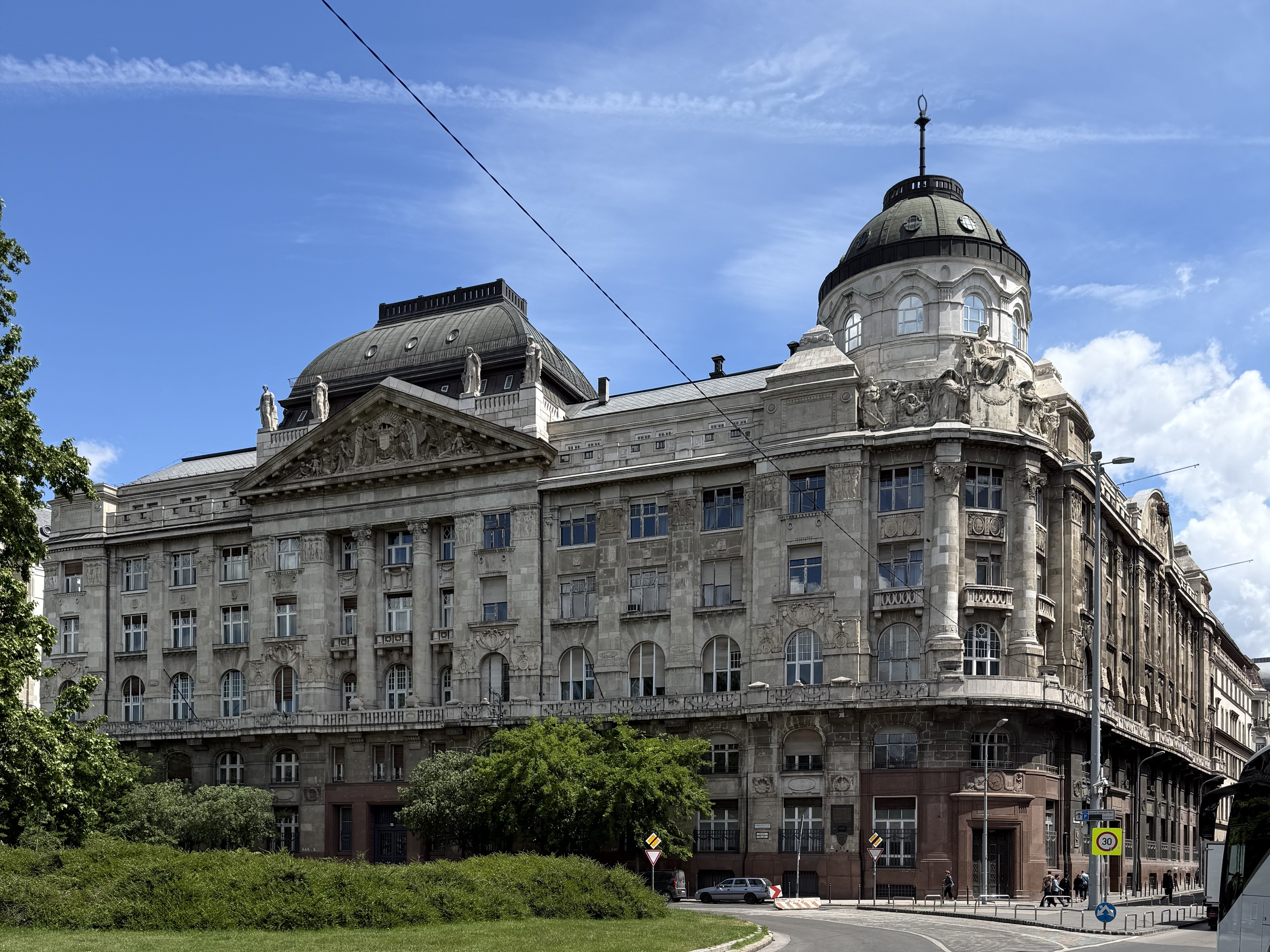
New head office building, completed in 1905

After 1867, many other banks were created in Hungary but the Hungarian Commercial Bank kept a pre-eminent position, financing numerous investments especially in railway construction and large companies. Hungarian nationalist politicians desired to transform it into an independent Hungarian National Bank, but this idea was not implemented and the Austro-Hungarian Bank was eventually established in 1878 with competence over both parts of the Habsburg monarchy.

During the stock market panic of 1873, the Hungarian Commercial Bank of Pest came near bankruptcy but survived. In 1881 it received capital support from Vienna's Länderbank, and subsequently merged with the Hungarian Land Credit Company (Hungarian: Magyar Általnosa Földhitel Rt., German: Ungarische Boden-Credit-Gesellschaft, known as the Földhitel). The idea of the merger came from Leó Lánczy, the director of the Földhitel, who subsequently became the general manager of the Hungarian Commercial Bank and then its chairman until his death in 1921. Under Lánczy's decades-long leadership, the bank prospered again and financed many large companies (e.g. Tungsram, Marx és Mérei, Engel Károly Alkatrészgyár, Budapest Telephone Network, Schlick factory, MARTA car factory) and railway ventures and utilities (e.g. Magyar Helyiérdekű Vasút Rt., Budapest City Electric Railway Rt., Budapesti Közúti Vaspálya Rt.).

At the beginning of the 1900s, they bought the Diana baths building on the corner of today's József Attila utca and Széchenyi tér, which was demolished and the new headquarters of the bank was built in an eclectic style based on the plans of Zsigmond Quittner. The building was handed over in 1905. Since 1950, it has been the headquarters of the Hungarian Ministry of the Interior.

By 1913, PMKB was Hungary's largest bank by total assets and profits. During the First World War, the Hungarian Commercial Bank of Pest under Lánczy's chairmanship was among the main organizers of the war economy, with Samu Stern as general manager.

=== After 1918 ===
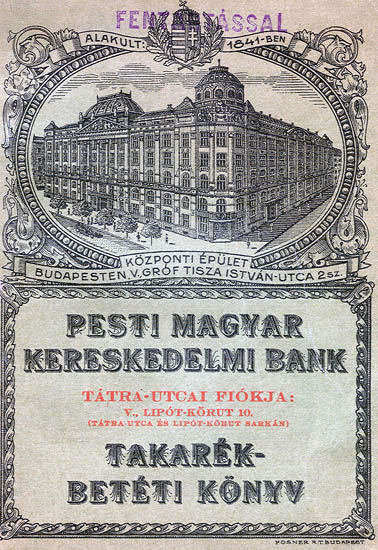
Savings account illustrated with the PMKB head office, mid-1930s

The Hungarian Commercial Bank of Pest managed to maintain a significant albeit diminished position in the immediate interwar period.

As a result of the 1938 anti-Jewish laws, the bank's chairman Fülöp Weiss was forced to resign. He was succeeded by Károly Lamotte who stayed until 1944. At the end of World War II, the bank's entire gold holdings was evacuated by the Hungarian Gold Train, but largely recovered in 1946. The PMKB was nationalized by the post-war communist regime and transformed into the exclusive manager of the country's foreign trade transactions. In 1950 its operations and assets were mostly taken over by the newly formed Magyar Külkereskedelmi Bank, later branded as MKB Bank.

== See also ==
- First National Savings Bank of Pest
- Hungarian General Credit Bank
- Hungarian Mortgage Credit Bank
- Hungarian Discount and Exchange Bank
- Hungarian Industrial and Commercial Bank
- First Croatian Savings Bank
- List of banks in Hungary
