= Hungarian General Credit Bank =

Former bank based in Budapest

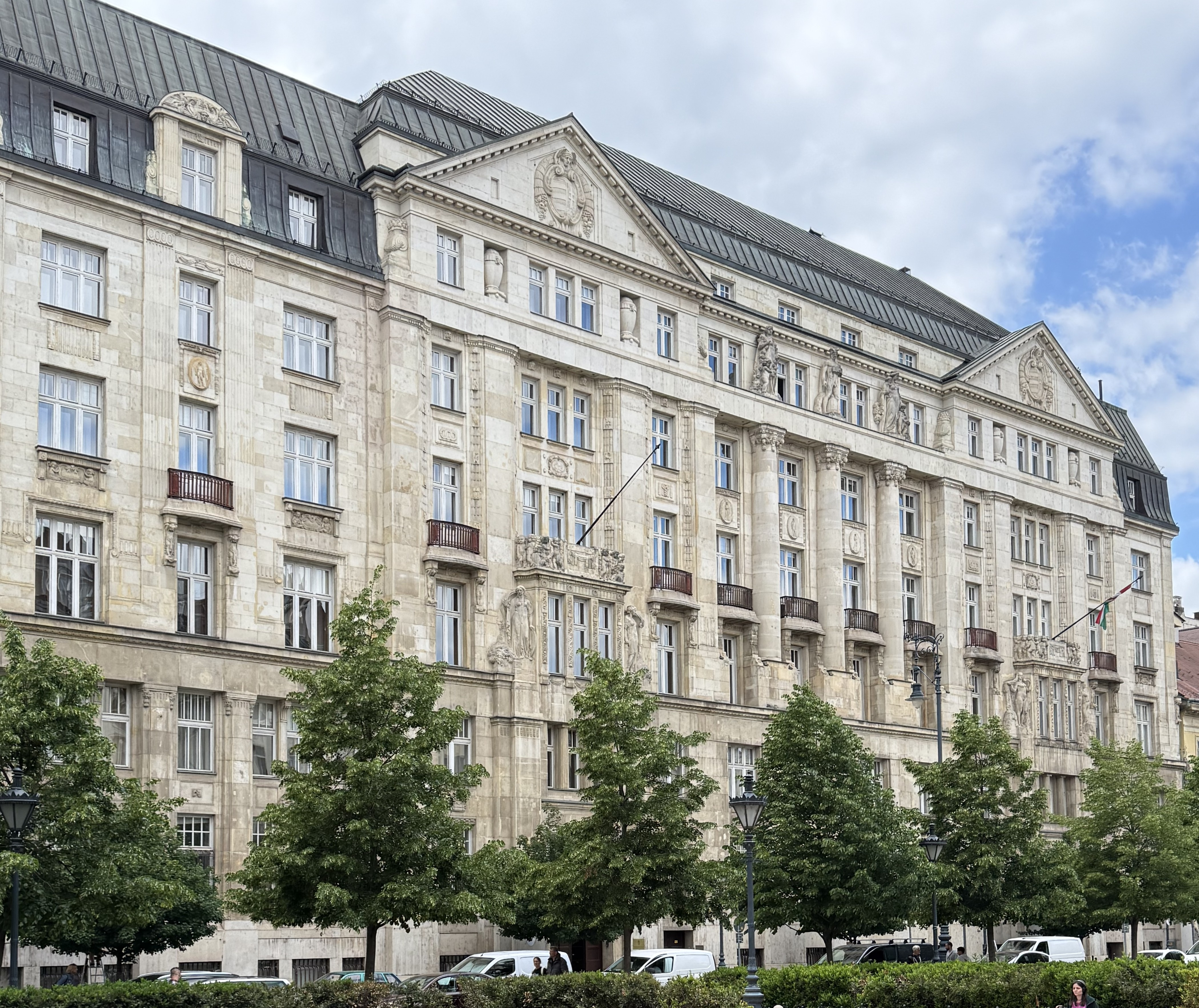
Former head office of the Hungarian General Credit Bank, later Ministry of Finance; designed by Ignác Alpár in 1909 and completed in 1913

The Hungarian General Credit Bank (Hungarian: Magyar Általános Hitelbank, MÁH, German: Ungarische Allgemeine Kreditbank, also known as Creditbank) was a major bank in Hungary, from its establishment in 1867 by the Rothschild family until its nationalization in 1948.

== History ==
=== Background ===
The Rothschild family was involved early on in financing operations in Hungary, including by providing a sixth of the equity capital for the construction of the iconic Széchenyi Chain Bridge and refinancing its cost overruns in the 1840s. In 1857, the Rothschild-sponsored Creditanstalt bank opened a branch in Pest.

=== Austro-Hungarian era ===
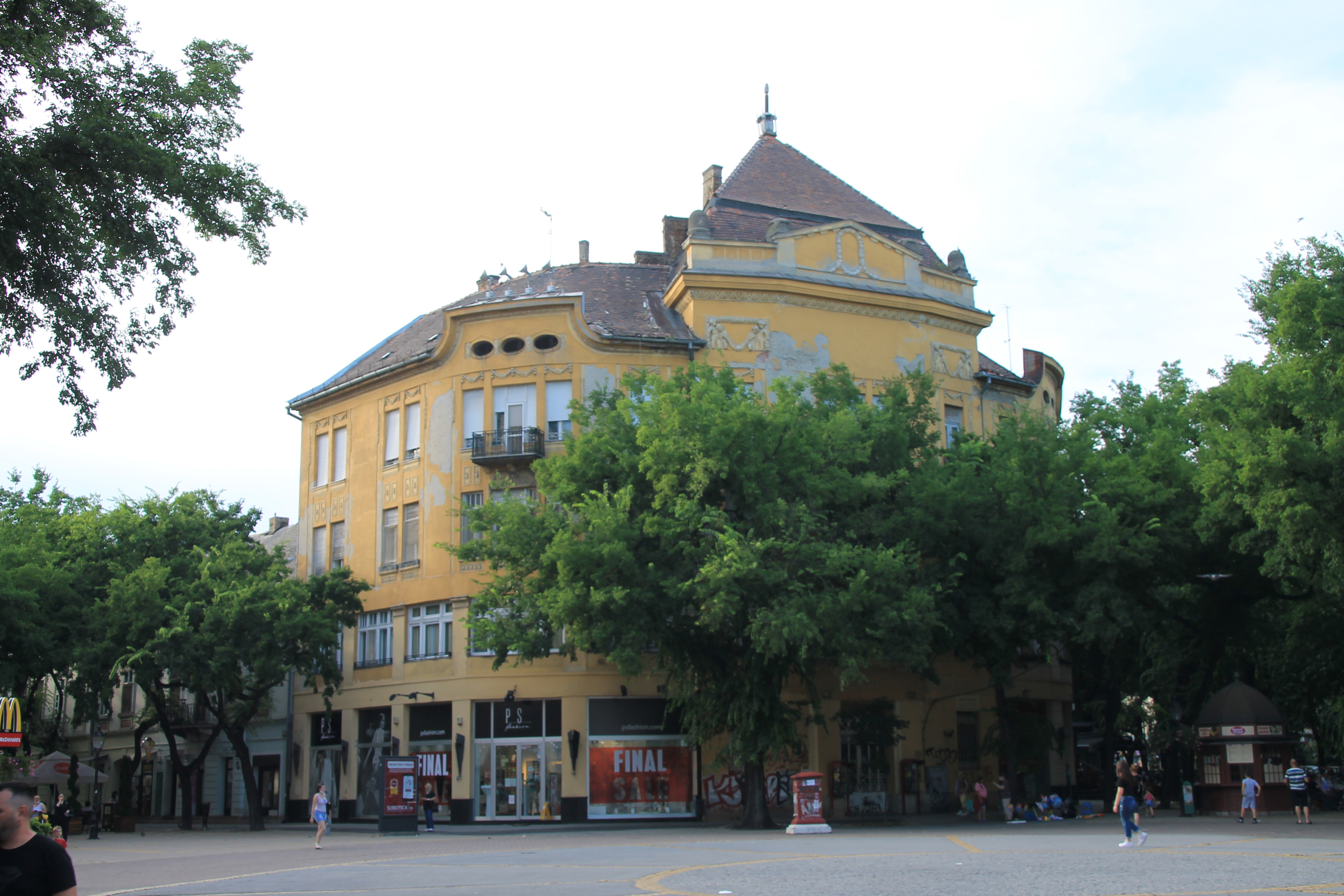
Former branch in Subotica, designed by Alfréd Hajós

The Hungarian General Credit Bank had its shares first traded on the Vienna Stock Exchange on 24 August 1867, ahead of its formal registration by the Hungarian Commercial and Exchange Court of Pest on 15 September 1867. In 1871, it took over the local branch of Creditanstalt. In 1873, it received a mandate from the recently created finance ministry for a range of transactions, which made it effectively the main banker of the Hungarian government; that role was reinforced and extend by successive acts in 1886, 1901, and 1915. In the 1890s, under Zsigmond Kornfeld's leadership, the Creditbank became increasingly autonomous from the Austrian Creditanstalt.

By the early 20th century, the Creditbank had acquired a dominant position on the Hungarian banking market. It acquired the First Hungarian Industrial Bank (Hungarian: Első Magyar Iparbank), which had been established in 1864. In 1912 during the Balkan Wars, it created an affiliate in Zagreb, the Croatian General Credit Bank (Croatian: Hrvatska sveopca kreditna banka), of which it retained overwhelming majority control until 1945. By 1913, it ranked fourth among Hungary's commercial banks by total assets, behind the Hungarian Commercial Bank of Pest, the First National Savings Bank of Pest, and the Hungarian Mortgage Credit Bank, but second by profits behind the Hungarian Commercial Bank of Pest.

=== Interwar period ===
Following the turmoil of World War I, the Creditbank was able to retain its leading role within the national banking sector. Its links with the Creditanstalt were loosened, and in the early 1920s a 18-percent equity stake was acquired by Union Européenne Industrielle et Financière, an affiliate of the French Schneider-Creusot group in partnership with the Banque de l'Union Parisienne and Belgium's Empain group.

By 1924 its Croatian affiliate, the Croatian General Credit Bank, had branches in Čakovec, Karlovac, and Varaždin.

The bank was severely affected by the European banking crisis of 1931, when it narrowly avoided bankruptcy thanks to swift government intervention. It returned to profitability in 1936–1937. In 1938, it absorbed the Hungarian General Savings Bank (Hungarian: Magyar Általános Takarékpénztár). It remained among the country's leading banks throughout the interwar period.

=== World War II and aftermath ===
In September 1941, Dresdner Bank appropriated the Schneider-owned block of shares, which from 1945 fell into the Soviet occupation zone of Germany and were thus claimed by the Soviet authorities under the terms of the Potsdam Conference. In 1946, the General Credit Bank merged with the Hungarian National Central Savings Bank (Hungarian: Magyar Országos Központi Takarékpénztár, MOKT). The new group did not survive for long, however; it came under direct management by the State Banks' Executive Committee in January 1948, and disappeared by the mid-1950s.

== Leadership ==
- Antal Frank, Director 1867-1876?
- Vince Weininger, Managing Director 1876-1879
- Ede Pallavicini, Managing Director 1880-1900
- Zsigmond Kornfeld, member of the board of directors from 1878, Managing Director 1900-1909
- Adolf Ullmann, member of the board of directors from 1885, Chairman 1895–1900, Managing Director 1909-1923
- Tibor Scitovszky, Managing Director 1923-1924 and 1925–1939, Chairman 1944-1947
- Tihamér Fabinyi, Managing Director 1939-1944
- György Ullmann, Managing Director 1944-1947
- István Földes, temporary manager 1947-1948

== See also ==
- Béla Sulyok
- Austro-Hungarian Bank
- Hungarian National Bank
- List of banks in Hungary
