= List of Hungarians by net worth =

This list of Hungarians by net worth article consists ranks that claims to be the list of the richest Hungarians according to the individual's net worth. Some of the following lists of Hungarian millionaires and billionaires are based on an annual assessment of wealth and assets compiled and published by Forbes magazine.

== Hungarians by net worth in 2017 by Forbes ==
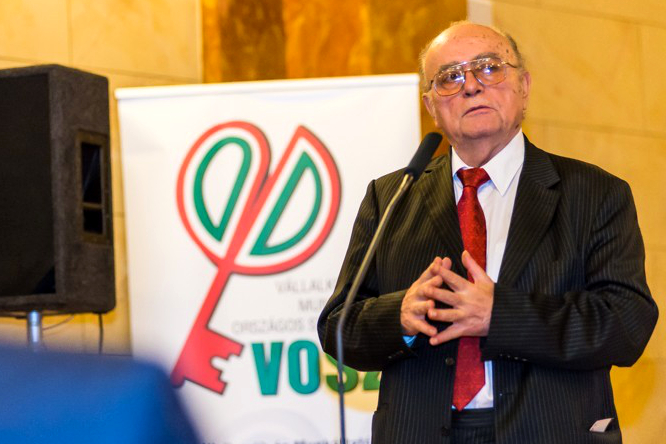
Sándor Demján was the second richest person in Hungary

Hungarians by net worth in 2017 by Forbes
Rank	Name	Net worth (HUF)	Net worth (EUR)	Field	Source of wealth
1	Sándor Csányi	294.3 billion	0.943 billion	Investment banking Commercial banking Oil industry Food production	OTP Bank; MOL Group; Bonafarm
2	Sándor Demján	192.0 billion	0.615 billion	Construction; Real estate Investment banking	TriGranit; Arcadom; Euroinvest; Gránit Bank
3	György Gattyán	188.6 billion	0.604 billion	IT industry	Docler Holding
4	Gábor Széles	147.1 billion	0.471 billion	Transport vehicle production Electrical engineering	Ikarus Bus; Videoton
5	Tibor Veres	140.5 billion	0.450 billion	Real estate Building material production	Wallis
6	László Bige	120.6 billion	0.387 billion	Chemical industry	Bige Holding
7	Zsolt Felcsuti	112.0 billion	0.359 billion	Building engineering Machine manufacturing	MPF Industry Group
8	Lőrinc Mészáros	105.7 billion	0.339 billion	Media; Hotel industry Agriculture; Construction	Opus Global; Apennin Holding; CIG Pannonia
9	László Szíjj	105.3 billion	0.338 billion	Construction	Duna Aszfalt
10	Lajos Kasza	90.5 billion	0.295 billion	Automotive manufacturing	Jász-Plastik

== Hungarian expats by net worth in 2017 ==
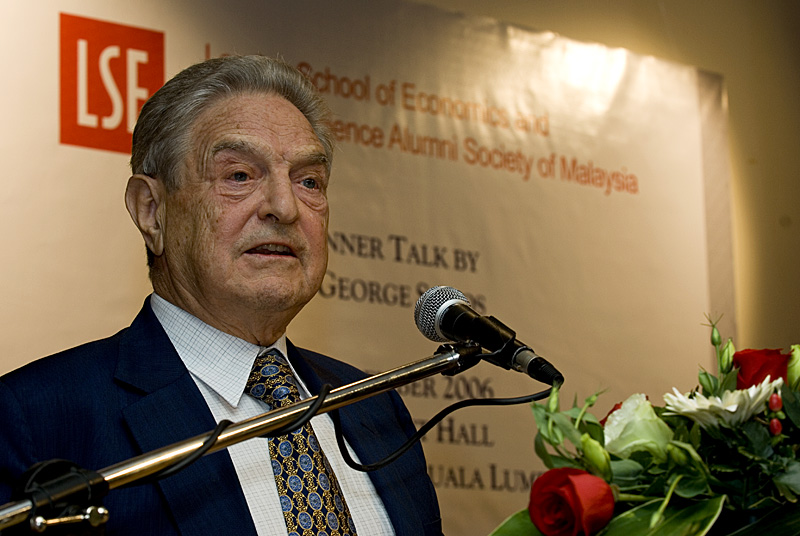
George Soros is the second richest Hungarian in the world

Hungarian expats by net worth in 2017 (excluded from the Forbes Hungary′s list)
Rank	Name	Net worth (HUF)	Net worth (USD)	Field	Source of worth
1	Thomas Peterffy	4,797 billion	18.100 billion	Financial services	Interactive Brokers
2	George Soros	2,120 billion	8.000 billion	Hedge fund	Soros Fund Management
3	Frank Lowy	1,548 billion	5.800 billion	Real estate	Westfield Corporation
4	Steven F. Udvar-Hazy	1,034 billion	3.900 billion	Leasing	International Lease Finance Corporation; Air Lease Corporation
5	Charles Simonyi	636 billion	2.100 billion	Software development	Microsoft; Intentional Software
6	Megdet Rahimkulov	447 billion	1.690 billion	Oil industry Commercial banking Private banking	Gazprom; MOL Group; OTP Bank; VTB Bank
7	Alexander Rovt	365 billion	1.3 billion	Agriculture	IBE Trade
8	Frank Hasenfratz	270 billion	1.020 billion	Automotive industry	Linamar
9	Paul Lederer	167 billion	0.625 billion	Food production	Primo Smallgoods

(Viktor Orban ~1.2B. Ft)

== Hungarians by net worth on the turn of the 19th century by Forbes ==
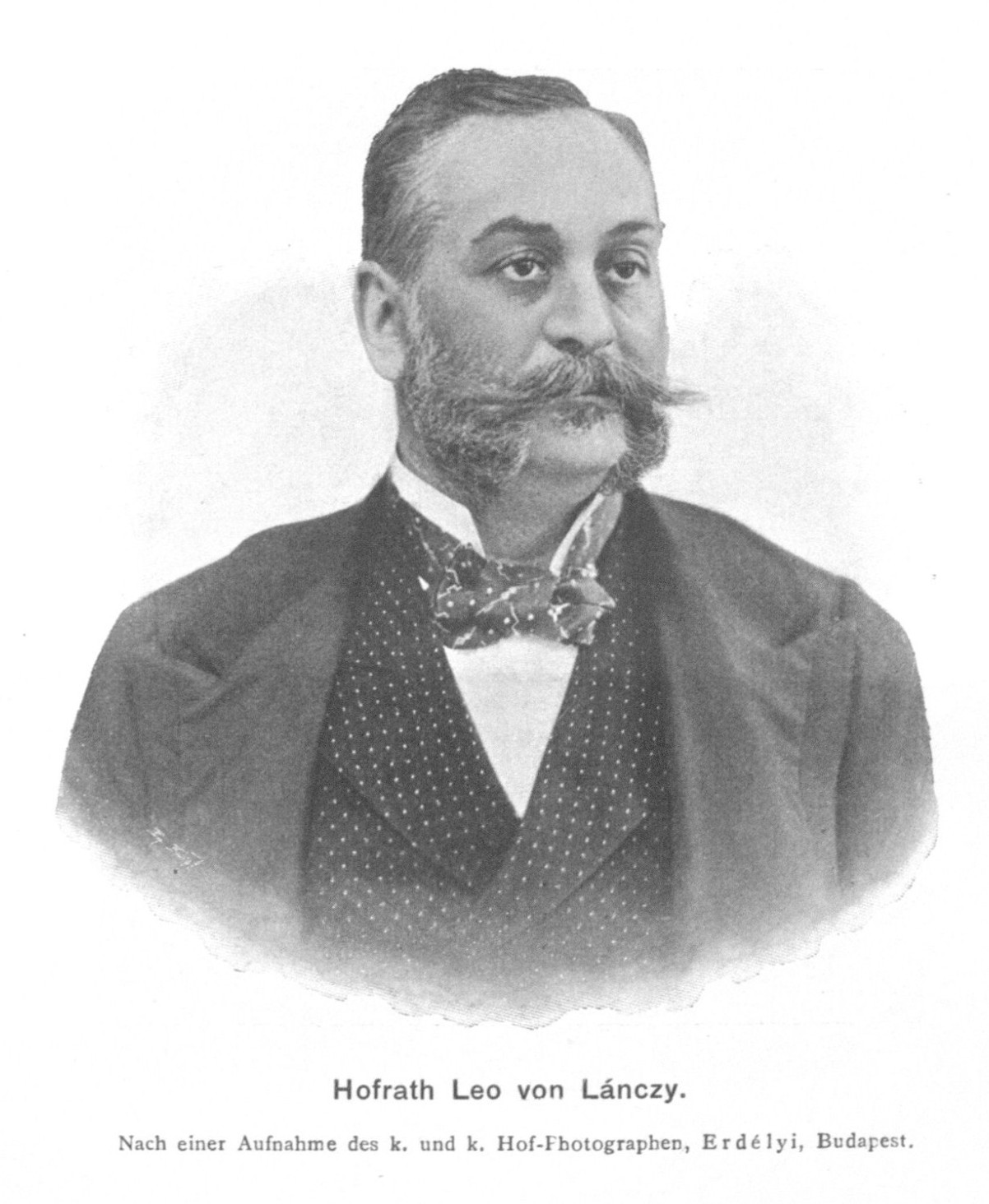
Leó Lánczy (1852–1921) was one of the richest persons in Hungary at the end of the 19th century

Hungarians by net worth on the turn of the 19th century by Forbes
Rank	Name	Net worth (Hungarian pengő)	Field	Source of worth
1	Manfréd Weiss (1857–1922)	30–35 million	Steel production	Manfréd Weiss Steel and Metal Works
2	Miksa Schiffer (1867–1944)	15–30 million	Construction	Palatinus; Ogulin-országhatárszéli Vasút Építő
3	Henrik Fellner (1859–1932)	25–30 million	Spirit production Sugar industry Electrical engineering	Leipziger Vilmos Szesz- és Cukorgyár; Egyesült Izzólámpa és Villamossági Rt.
4	Sándor Hatvany-Deutsch (1852–1913)	25–30 million	Sugar industry	Nagy-Surányi Cukorgyár és Finomító; Hatvani Cukorgyár; Oroszkai Cukorgyár; Vas megyei Cukorgyár; Alföldi Cukorgyár
5	Anton Dreher (1810–1863)	18–20 million	Beer production	Dreher Breweries
6	Henrik Haggenmacher (1827–1917)	18–20 million	Beer production Milling industry Chemical industry	Dreher Breweries; Első Budapesti Gőzmalom; Flóra, Első Magyar Stearin-, Gyertya- és Szappangyár
7	Ernő Gschwindt (1881–1932)	18–20 million	Spirit production	Gschwindt-féle Szesz-, Élesztő-, Likőr- és Rumgyár
8	Gyula Wolfner (1814–1889); Lajos Wolfner (1824–1912)	18–20 million	Leather production	Wolfner Gyula és Társa
9	Leó Lánczy (1852–1921)	15 million	Investment banking	Pesti Magyar Kereskedelmi Bank
10	Gyula Klein (1862–1940)	10 million	Investment banking Electrical engineering Transport vehicle production	Magyar Általános Hitelbank; Ganz és Társa-Danubius Villamossági-, Gép-, Waggon- és Hajógyár

== Hungarians by net worth in 2025 by Forbes ==
Hungarians by net worth in 2025, by Forbes Hungary "50 Richest Hungarians"

Rank	Name	Net worth (HUF billion)	Field	Source of worth
1	Lőrinc Mészáros	1,749.1	Energy, finance, construction, agriculture, tourism	Opus Global Group, MBH Bank, Mészáros Group, Talentis Group
2	Tibor Veres	756.4	Real estate, investments, retail, energy	Wallis Group, Wing, Alteo
3	Sandor Csanyi	752.9	Banking, food, industry, agriculture, investments	OTP Bank, Bonafarm Group, MOL
4	Zsolt Felscutti	524.4	Industrial manufacturing, machinery, investments	MPF Holding
5	Laszlo Szijj	416.1	Construction, infrastructure	Duna Aszfalt
6	Gyorgy Gattyan	352.4	Technology, internet, real estate	Docler Group
7	Daniel Jellinek	312.7	Real estate, investments	Indotek Group
8	Tibor Pavelka	310.4	Industry, manufacturing, investments	Pavelka Group
9	Gellert Jaszai	309.0	Telecommunications, IT, media	4iG Group
10	Gabor Szeles	300.0	Manufacturing, technology, investments	Videoton, Muszertechnika

== See also ==
- Economy of Hungary
- List of Hungarian companies
