= Christus (statue) =

Statue by Bertel Thorvaldsen (1838)

Coordinates: 55°40′46″N 12°34′23″E

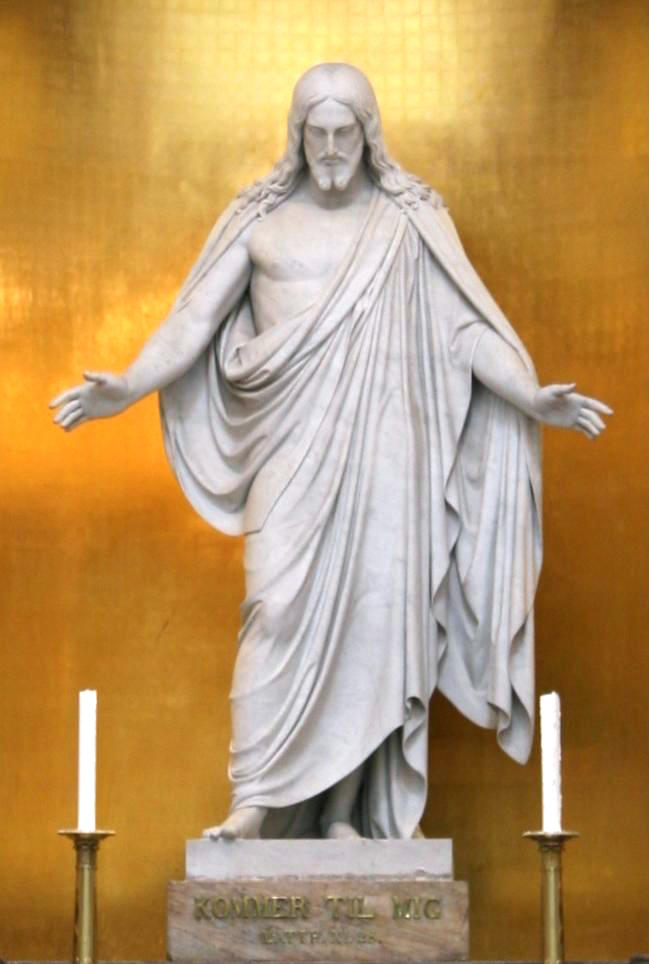
The original white Carrara marble statue, completed in 1833, in the Church of Our Lady in Copenhagen, Denmark

Christus is an 1833 white Carrara marble statue of the resurrected Jesus by Bertel Thorvaldsen located in the Church of Our Lady, an Evangelical Lutheran church in Copenhagen, Denmark. It was commissioned as part of a larger group, which includes 11 of the original 12 apostles and Paul the Apostle (instead of Judas Iscariot).

The statue has been widely reproduced; images and replicas of it were adopted by the leaders of the Church of Jesus Christ of Latter-day Saints (LDS Church) in the 20th century to emphasize the centrality of Jesus in its teachings.

== Original sculpture ==
The Church of Our Lady was destroyed by fire in September 1807 from bombardment by the British Royal Navy during the Battle of Copenhagen in 1807, part of the Napoleonic Wars. When the church was being rebuilt, Thorvaldsen was commissioned in 1819 to sculpt statues of Jesus and the apostles, a baptismal font, other furnishings, and decorative elements. A plaster cast model was supplied for the church's consecration on 7 June 1829, with the finished white Carrara marble statue replacing it in November 1833. The statue is 11-foot-4-inch (3.45-meter) tall.

The inscription at the base of the sculpture reads "Kommer til mig" ("Come unto me") with a reference to the Bible verse Matthew 11:28, in which Jesus is depicted with his hands spread, displaying the wounds in the hands of his resurrected body. The original plaster cast model is on display in the Thorvaldsen Museum in Copenhagen, Denmark.

== Sites of replicas ==
=== Churches ===
- Wawel Cathedral, Kraków, Poland (1833; mounted in 1835)
- St. Petri Church (Church of Norway), Stavanger, Norway (1853)
- Koranda Congregation Chapel (Evangelical Church of Czech Brethren), Plzeň, Czech Republic
- Church of the Transfiguration of The Lord (Old Catholic Church of the Czech Republic), Varnsdorf, Czech Republic
- St. John United Lutheran Church (1926; originally a Danish-speaking congregation) in the Phinney Ridge neighborhood of Seattle, Washington, U.S.
- St. Paul's United Methodist Church, Houston, Texas, U.S.
- Trinity Lutheran Church in Galesburg, Illinois, U.S. (a wood carving by Meyer in Oberammergau, Germany)
- Önsta Gryta Church (Church of Sweden) in Västerås, Sweden (2009; six feet tall; 30,000 white Lego pieces)
- In front of the Church of Peace, a Protestant church in Potsdam, Germany (1845–1854)
- In front of the Cathedral Church of the Advent (Episcopal) in Birmingham, Alabama, U.S.
- Bethania Lutheran Church in Racine, Wisconsin, US
- Loviisan Kirkko in Loviisa, Finland
- Hangon kirkko in Hanko, Finland
- Själevads kyrka in Själevad, Örnsköldsvik, Sweden
- St Peter's Lutheran Church, Loxton, South Australia, Australia
- Landskyrkan, Alingsås Sweden

=== Cemeteries ===
- Oakwood Cemetery in Huntsville, Texas, U.S. (bronze)
- Forest Lawn Memorial Park, Glendale, California, U.S. (1947; The Court of the Christus on Cathedral Drive)
- Forest Lawn Cypress cemetery, Cypress, California, U.S. (1959; The Garden of Faith on Sunset Drive)
- Forest Lawn Hollywood Hills cemetery, Hollywood Hills, California, U.S. (The Court of Remembrance)
- Forest Lawn Covina Hills cemetery, Covina Hills, California, U.S.
- Luisenfriedhof I cemetery, Berlin, Germany (bronze)
- Luisenfriedhof III cemetery, Berlin, Germany
- The Haggenmacher family tomb at the Farkasréti Cemetery, Budapest, Hungary (1919)
- Bento F. Silva family tomb at the Cemitério Jardim da Paz, São Borja, Rio Grande do Sul, Brazil (1926)
- Wang Church Cemetery, Karpacz, Poland
- Elmwood Cemetery in Memphis, TN
- Quincy Memorial Park in Quincy, Illinois
- Royal Burial Ground, Frogmore, Berkshire, England (1903)

=== Hospital ===
- Johns Hopkins Hospital, Baltimore, Maryland, U.S. (1896; Christus Consolator)

== LDS Church use ==
Stephen L Richards, an apostle and first counselor to church president David O. McKay in the First Presidency, purchased a replica of the Christus in the late 1950s and gifted it to the church. It was completed by the Rebechi Aldo & Gualtiero studio and made from white Carrara marble from Pietrasanta, Tuscany, Italy in April 1959. It arrived in Salt Lake City, Utah in June 1959. It was placed in the unfinished North Visitors' Center on Temple Square in Salt Lake City in 1962, and was unveiled in 1967. It is 11-foot-0.25-inch (3.36-meter) tall and weighs 12,000 pounds. In preparation for the demolition of the North Visitors’ Center, the replica was removed in November 2021 and placed in storage for conservation. In an April 2026 media preview, a replica was shown in the west wing of the new visitors' center, which opened to the public on May 18, 2026.

A second Christus replica was sculpted by the Rebechi Aldo & Gualtiero studio to be displayed in the LDS Pavilion at the 1964 New York World's Fair. It was a duplicate of the Salt Lake City replica being 11-foot-0.25-inch (3.36-meter) tall and weighing 12,000 pounds. Its display "was intended to help visitors understand that Latter-day Saints are Christians". After the World's Fair ended on 17 October 1965, the replica was shipped from New York to the Los Angeles California Temple visitors' center on 21 November 1966.

The church commissioned the Rebechi Aldo & Gualtiero studio to sculpt a third replica of the Christus statue for the Expo 1970 in Osaka, Japan. It was 9’6” tall and weighed 10,000-11,000 pounds. After the expo ended on 13 September 1970, it was stored in a warehouse in Japan for six years. It was then shipped from Japan to New Zealand in March 1977. The renovated Hamilton New Zealand Temple visitors' centre reopened with it inside on 4 August 1977.

Since then, the church has created replicas of the statue and displayed them in temple visitors' centers at the Laie Hawaii, Mexico City Mexico, Washington D.C., Oakland California, St. George Utah, Idaho Falls Idaho, Nauvoo Illinois, Palmyra New York, London England, Portland Oregon, Paris France, São Paulo Brazil, Provo City Center, and Rome Italy temples, with the statue in Rome also accompanied by replicas of Thorvaldsen's twelve apostles.

Replicas are also displayed in the visitors' centers in Nauvoo, Illinois, the Hill Cumorah in Palmyra, New York, and Independence, Missouri. Other replicas are displayed in the church's meetinghouses in Hyde Park in London, Garðabær, Iceland (2000), and Copenhagen, Denmark.

In December 2019, another replica (8-foot-tall) was placed across the street in the Conference Center.

On 4 April 2020, church president Russell M. Nelson announced a new symbol for the church, featuring an image of the Christus as the central element, placed above the church's name. The church uses the image on its webpages and in other official publications.

== Image gallery ==
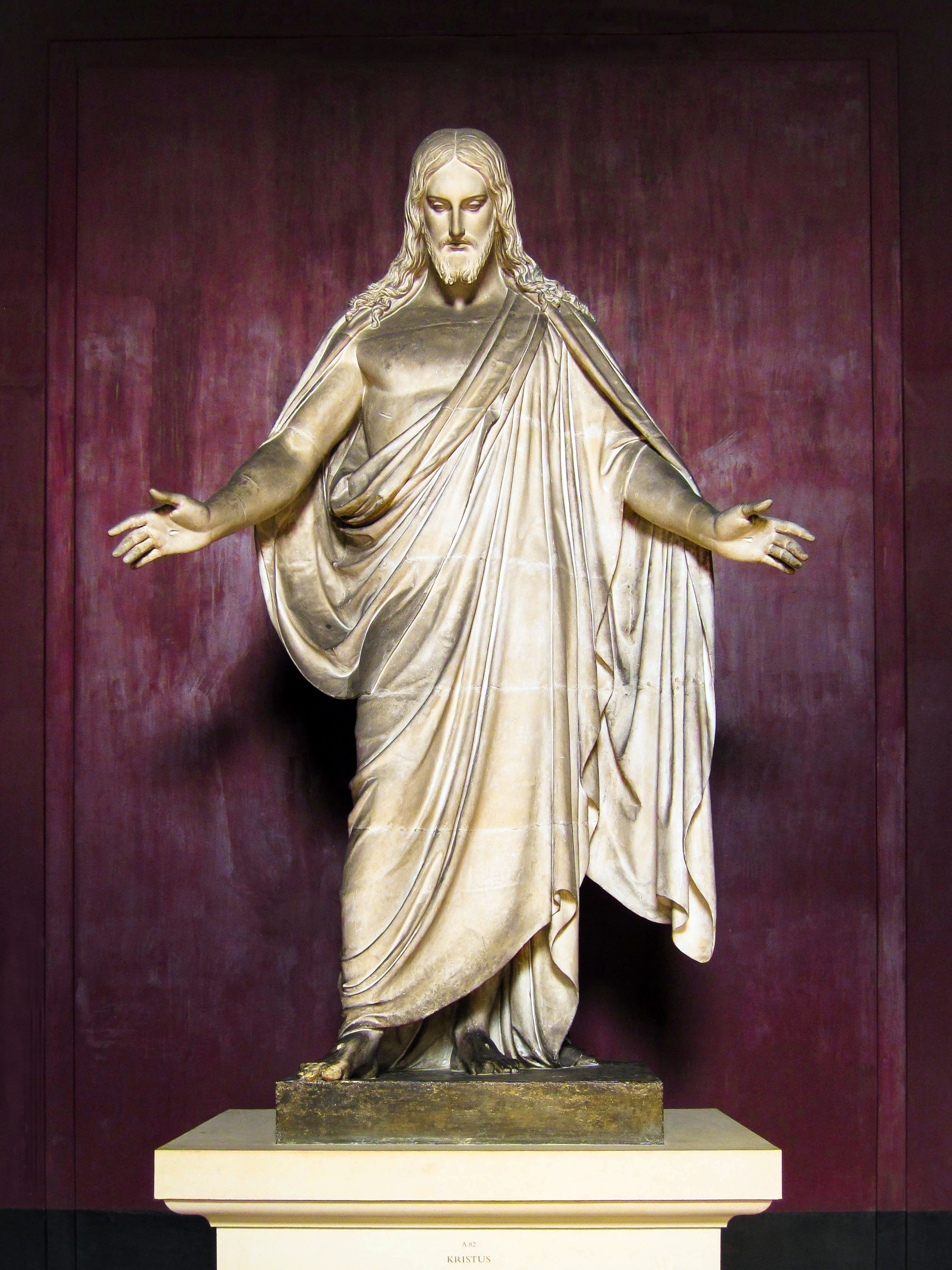
The original plaster cast model of Christus (1822) by Thorvaldsen in Thorvaldsen Museum in Copenhagen, Denmark

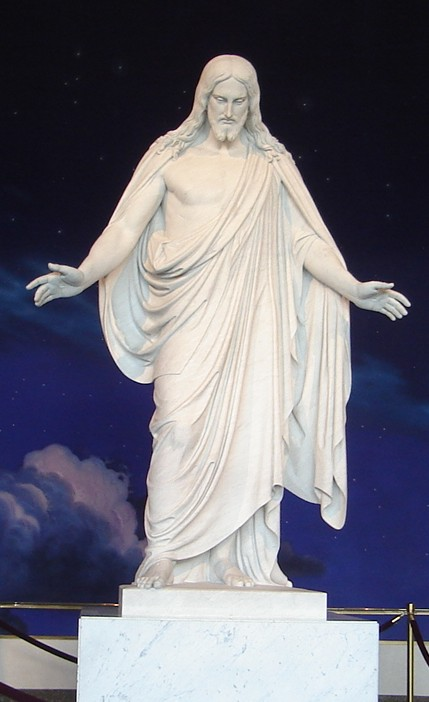
Marble replica (1959) in the North Visitors' Center on Temple Square in Salt Lake City, Utah, U.S. This facility was demolished in November 2021.

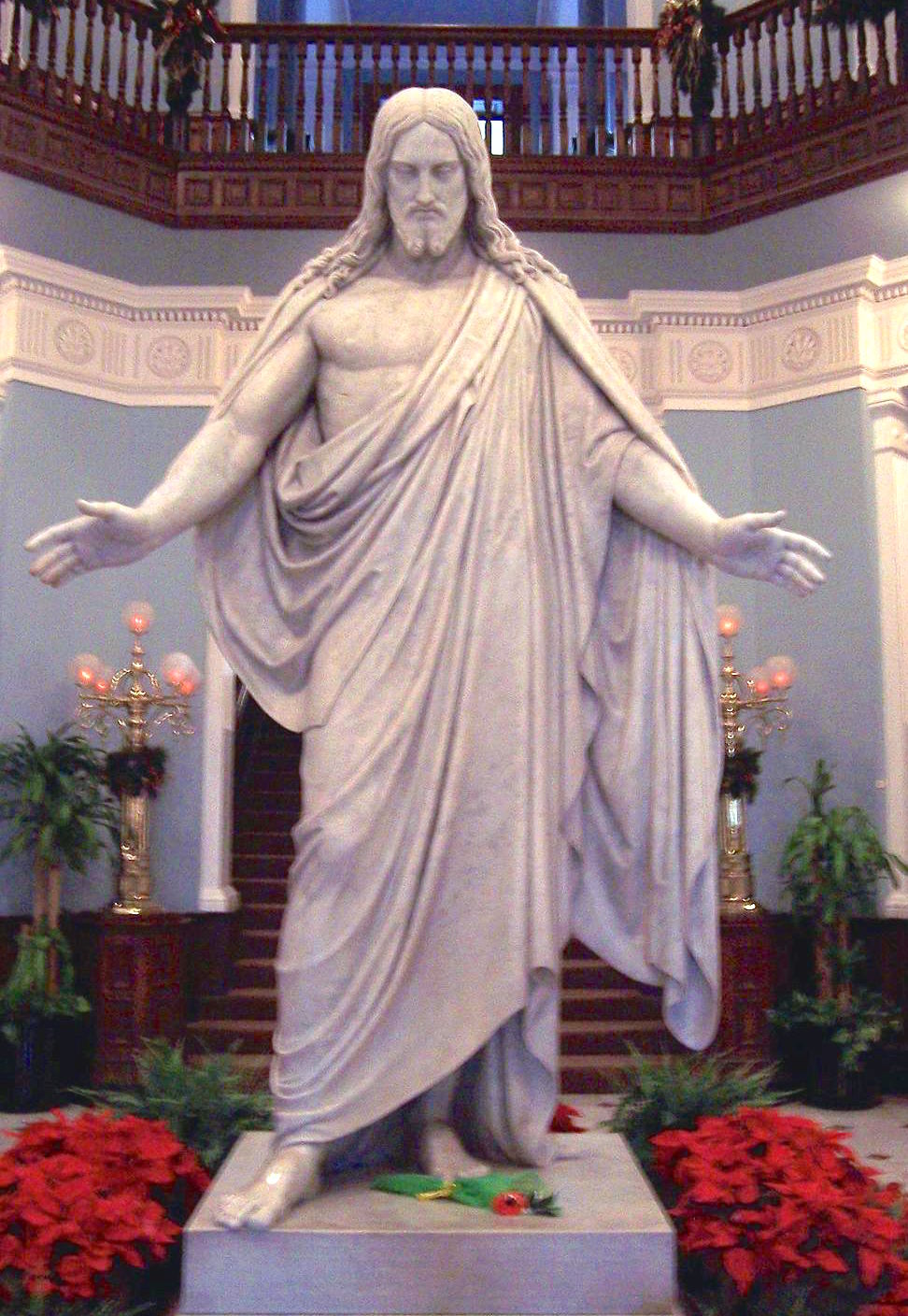
Replica (1896) in the Johns Hopkins Hospital in Baltimore, Maryland, U.S.

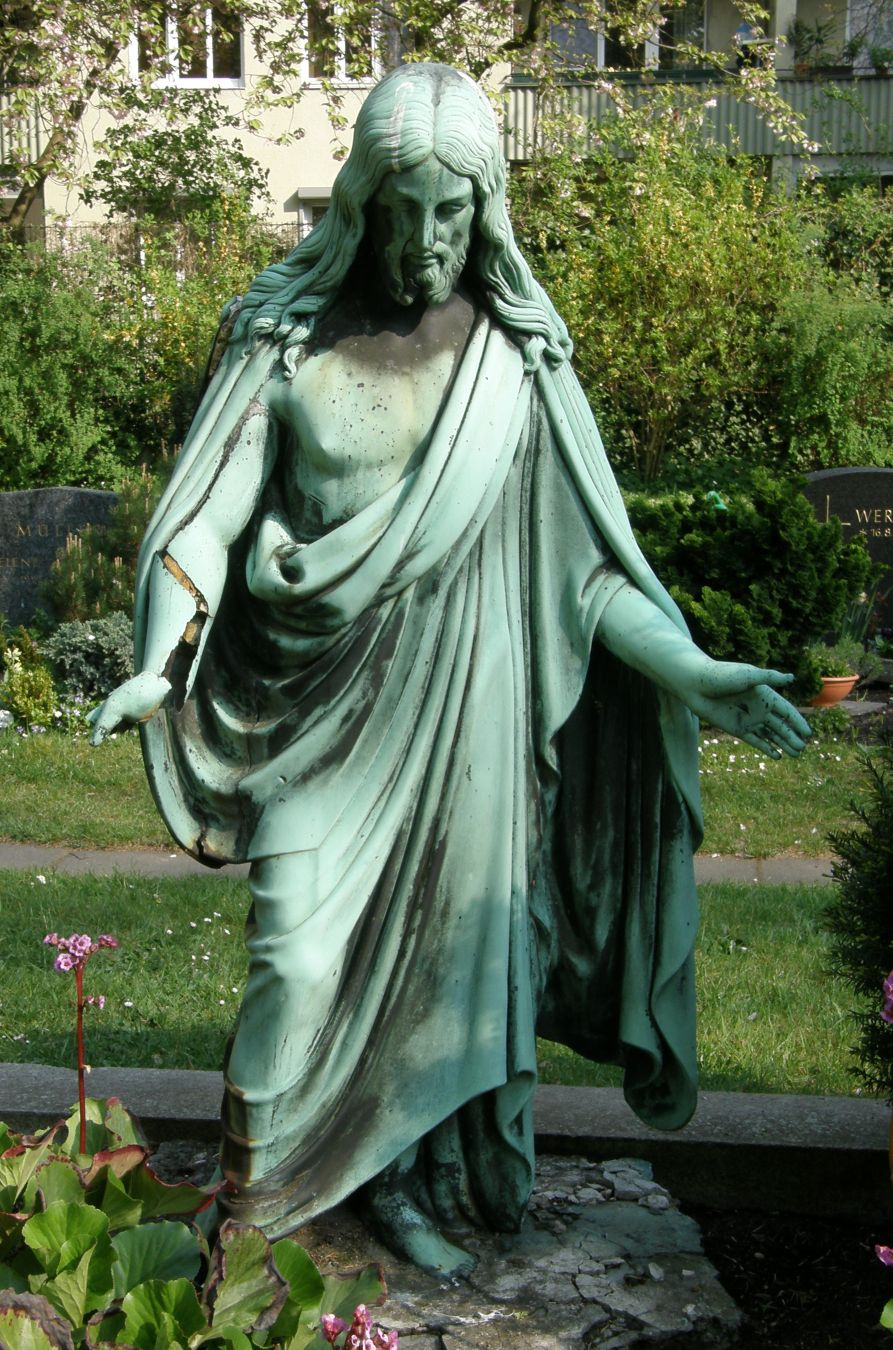
Bronze replica in the Luisenfriedhof I Cemetery in Berlin, Germany

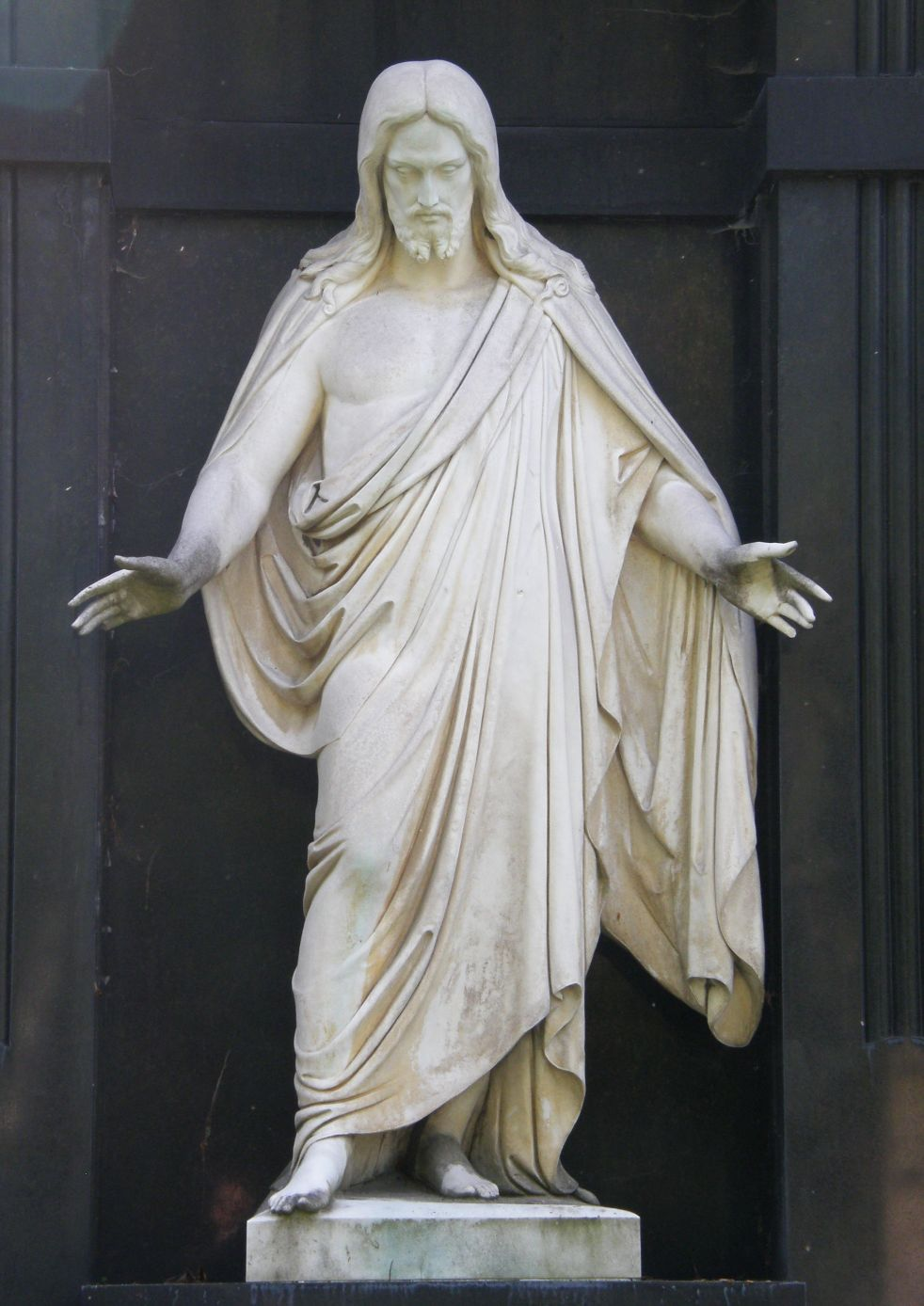
Replica in the Luisenfriedhof III Cemetery in Berlin, Germany

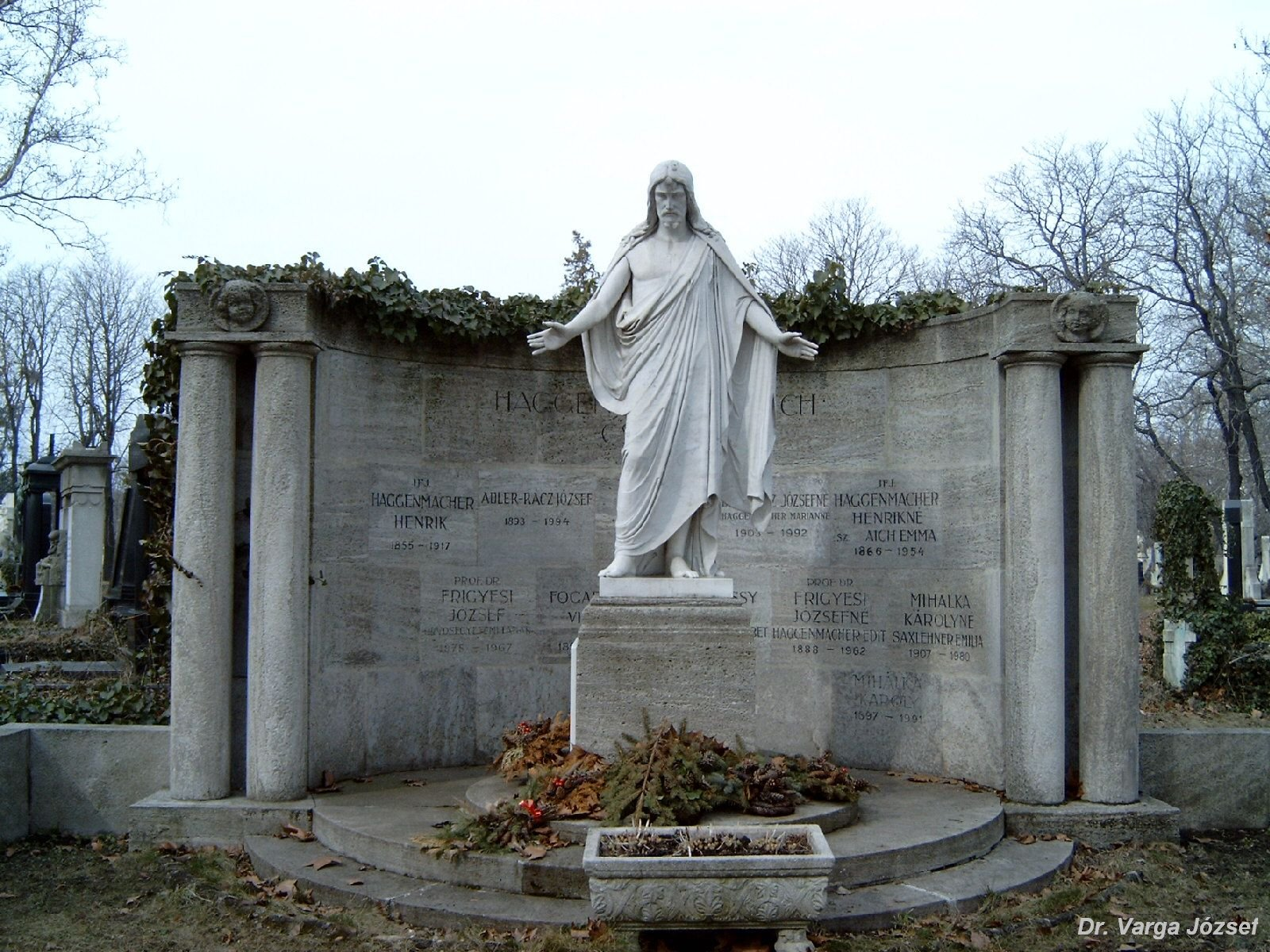
Replica at the Haggenmacher family tomb at the Farkasréti Cemetery in Budapest, Hungary (1916)

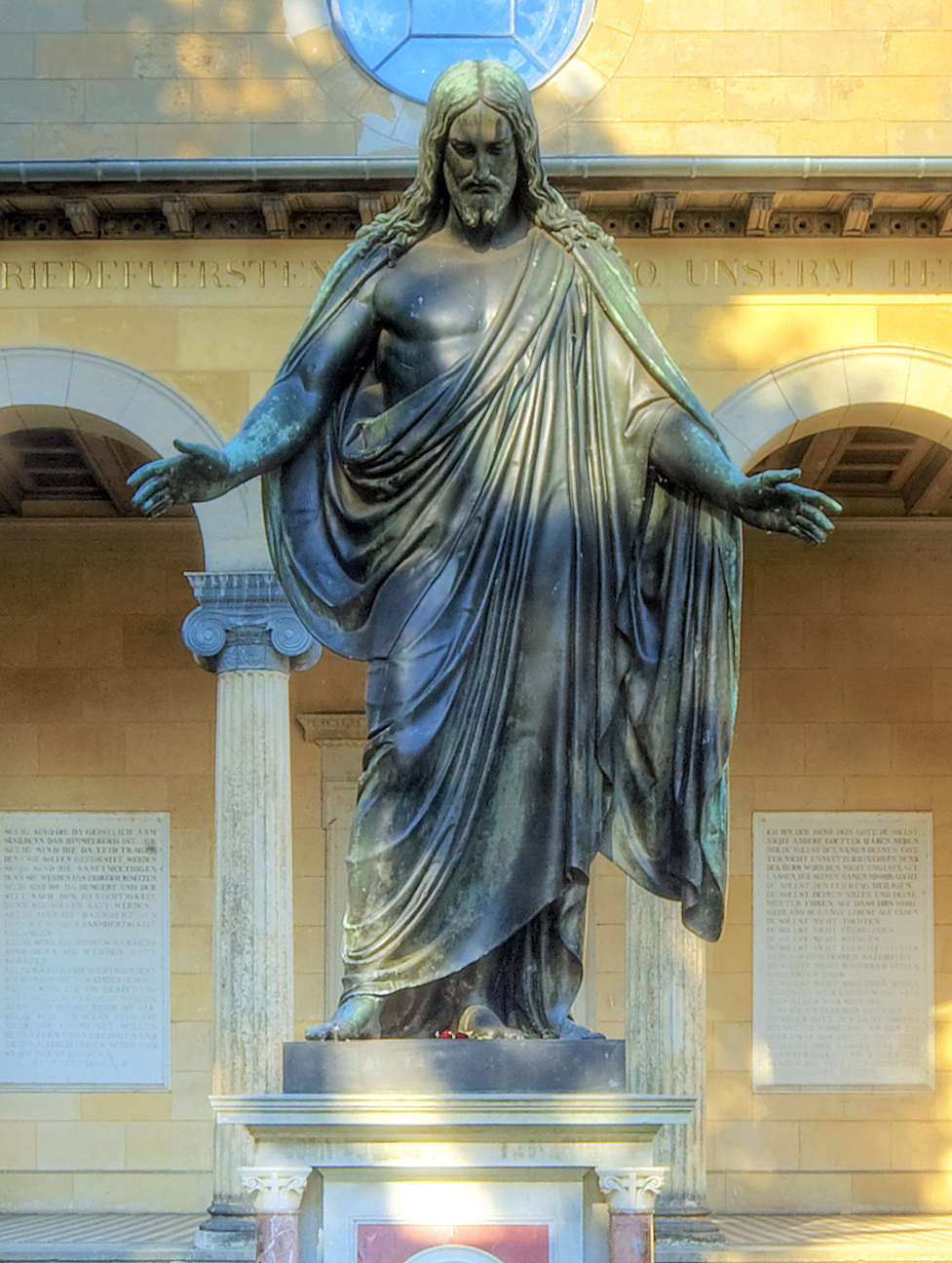
Replica in front of the Church of Peace (Protestant) in Potsdam, Germany (1845-1854)

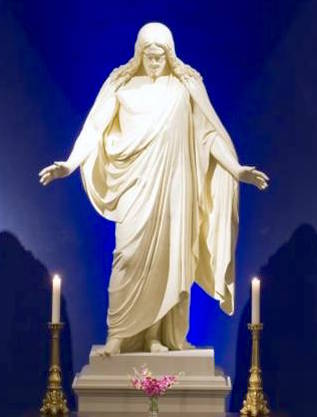
Replica in the St. Petri Church (Church of Norway) in Stavanger, Norway (1853)

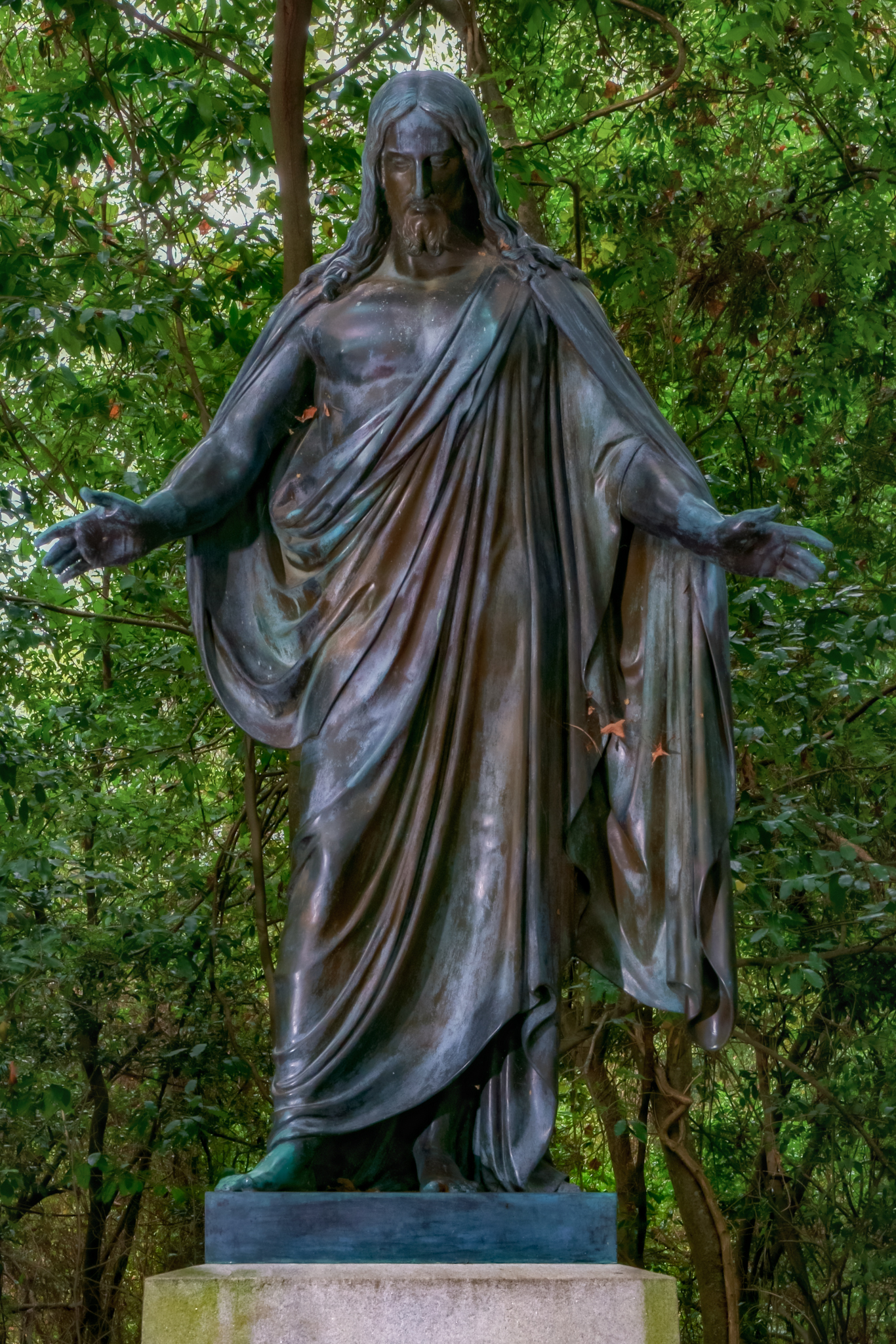
Bronze replica in the Oakwood Cemetery in Huntsville, Texas, U.S.

== See also ==
- List of statues of Jesus
