= Hatvani =

Hatvani/Hatvany is a Hungarian surname. The name derives from Hatvan, Hungary. It may refer to:

Hatvani

- István Hatvani (1718–1786), Hungarian mathematician, scientist
- Mihály Hatvani, a penname of Mihály Horváth (1809–1878)

Hatvany

- Sándor Hatvany-Deutsch (1852–1913), Hungarian industrialist
- Ferenc Hatvany (1881–1958)
- Béla Hatvany (1938–), Entrepreneur
- Baroness Katalin Hatvany de Hatvan (1947–), Hungarian designer

== See also ==
- List of titled noble families in the Kingdom of Hungary
