= List of Ferencvárosi TC presidents =

List of presidents of Ferencvárosi TC sports club.

== Presidents ==
Further information

Name	From-To	Occupation	Honours
dr. Ferenc Springer	3 May 1899 – 29 Oct. 1920	#1 founding member, lawyer and politician	Football team: 8x champions of NB I 1x champion of Magyar Kupa Water polo team: 7x champion of OB I 1x champion of Magyar Kupa
Aladár Matyók (executive)	1 Nov. 1920 – 23 Mar. 1923		Football team: 1x champion of Magyar Kupa Water polo team: 2x champion of OB I
Ernő Gschwindt	24 Mar. 1923 – 15 Aug. 1931	Businessman	Football team: 3x champions of NB I 2x champion of Magyar Kupa Water polo team: 3x champion of OB I 3x champion of Magyar Kupa
Béla Mailinger (executive)	12 Oct. 1931 – 26 Dec. 1944		
dr. Béla Usetty	29 May 1937 – 31 May 1944	Lawyer and member of parliament	
Andor Jaross	2 Aug. 1944 – 26 Dec. 1944	Politician	
Adolf Nádas (executive)	29 Sep. 1945 – 16 Feb. 1950		
dr. Ferenc Münnich	20 Mar. 1948 – 16 Feb. 1950	Politician who Chairman of the Council of Ministers of the People's Republic of Hungary	
Árpád Nöhrer	16 Feb. 1950 – 6 Aug. 1951		
István Száraz	6 Aug. 1951 – 31 Dec. 1952	Former footballer	

=== Gallery ===
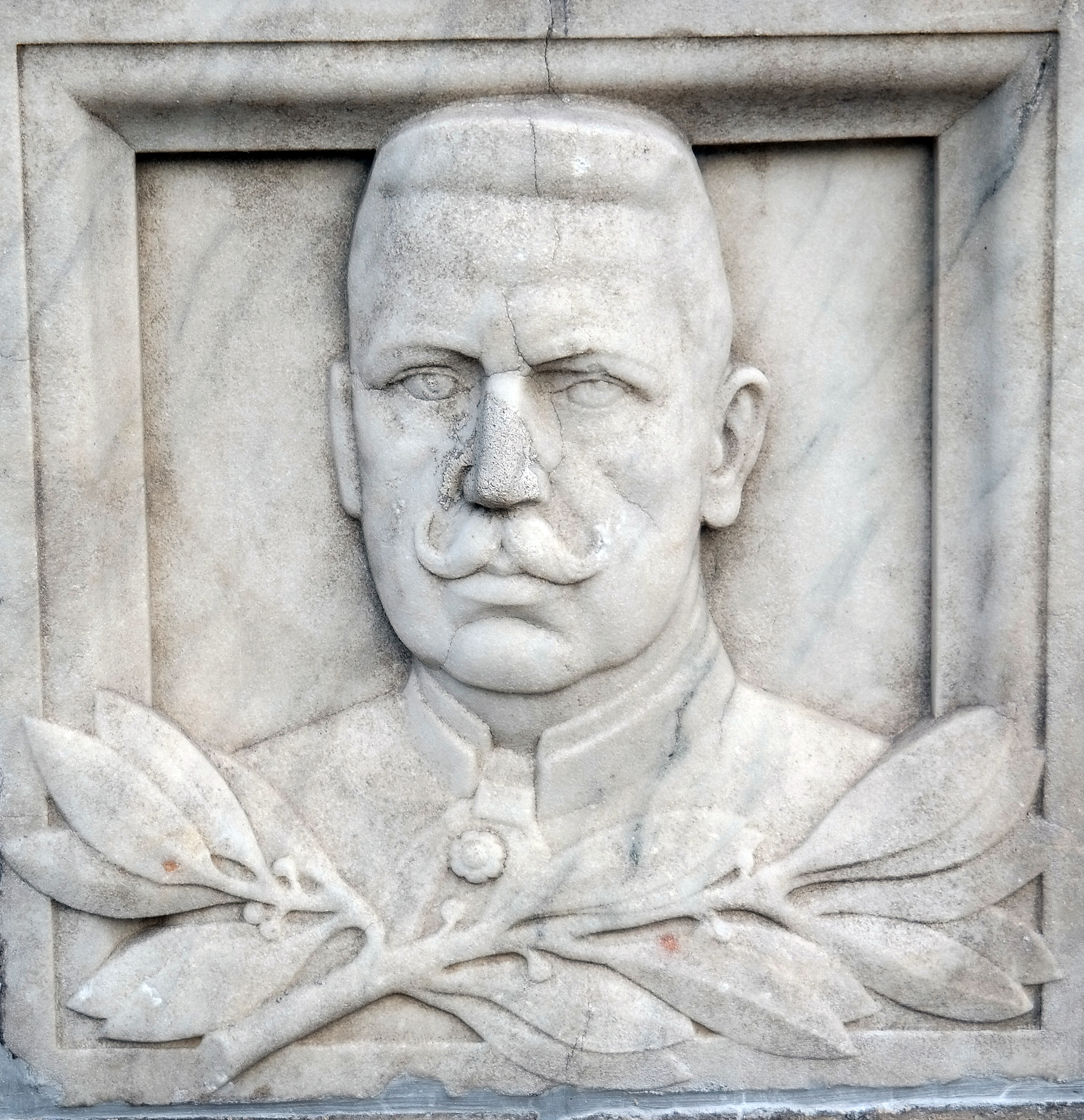
Ferenc Springer

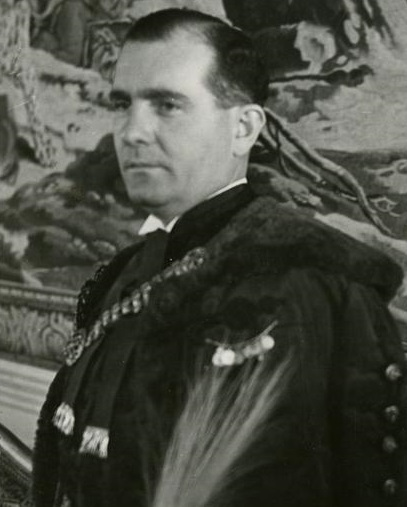
Andor Jaross

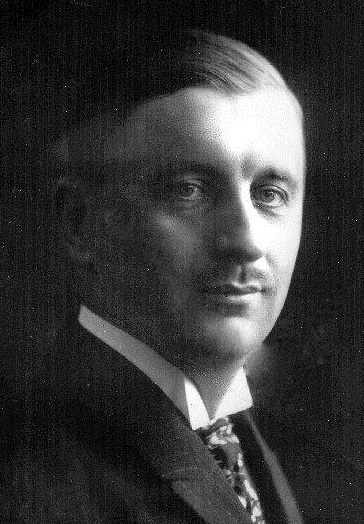
Ferenc Münnich

=== List ===
1. Ferenc Springer
2. Aladár Mattyók
3. Ernő Gschwindt
4. Béla Mailinger
5. Béla Usetty
6. Andor Jaross
7. Adolf Nádas
8. Ferenc Münnich
9. Árpád Nöhrer
10. István Száraz

== Sources ==
- tempofradi.hu, A Ferencvárosi Torna Club elnökei
