= Sándor Hatvany-Deutsch =

Hungarian Jewish industrialist, business magnate, and investor

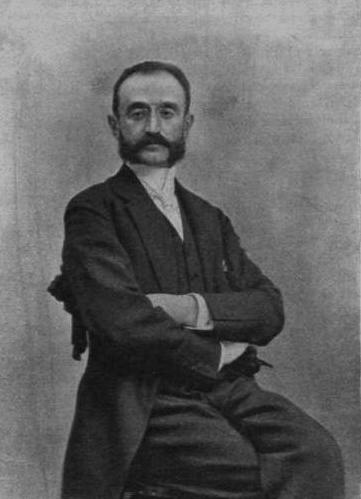
- Born: 17 November 1852; Arad, Austria-Hungary
- Died: 18 February 1913 (aged 60); Budapest, Austria-Hungary
- Occupation: banker
- Board member of: CEO (Deutsch Ig. és Fia- Deutsch Ig. & Son); Chairman (Cukorgyárosok Országos Szövetsége - National Alliance of Sugarproducers); Vice-Chairman (Hazai Bank); Board Member (First National Savings Bank of Pest); Board Member (Budapesti Giro- és Pénztáregylet - Giro- and Cash Association)
- Spouse(s): Emma Hatvany-Deutsch; Ottilia Amberg(1913)
- Children: Lajos; Ferenc; Irén
- Parent(s): József Deutsch; Paulina Krishaber

Baron Sándor Hatvany-Deutsch (12 November 1852 – 18 February 1913) was a leading Hungarian Jewish industrialist, business magnate, philanthropist, investor and art patron. He led the family's sugar company with its factories Nagy-Surányi Cukorgyár és Finomító Rt. (est. 1854, Nagysurány), Hatvani Cukorgyár Rt. (est. 1889, Hatvan), Oroszkai Cukorgyár Rt. (est. 1893, Oroszka), Vas megyei Cukorgyár Rt. (est. 1895, Sárvár) and the Alföldi Cukorgyár Rt. (est. 1910, Sarkad) which made him one of the wealthiest persons in Austria-Hungary. He founded in 1902 with Ferenc Chorin the National Alliance of Industrialists (Gyáriparosok Országos Szövetsége (GYOSZ)) and was the first vice president of the association. According to Forbes he was the 4th richest person in Hungary on the turn of the 19th century with a net worth of 25–30 million Hungarian pengő.

== Life ==
His father, József Deutsch, was knighted for his economic achievements in 1879 by the Emperor and allowed to use the prefix 'de Hatvan'. After his studies, Sándor Deutsch de Hatvan joined the family trading business, and with the help of his cousins, made it into a major player in the sugar industry. Through their firm, Ignatz Deutsch & Sons, founded in Arad in 1822 and later moved to Budapest, the cousins grew sugar beet on large estates, set up refineries across Hungary for processing and exported their sugar on world markets. Although sugar was the source of the vast Hatvany fortune, the family was also involved in flour mills and grain trading, banking, among other activities.

In 1908, Sándor was made a baron by Franz Joseph I of Austria, became a member of the Senate, and assumed the name Hatvany-Deutsch. Sándor Hatvany-Deutsch participated in the creation of the National Association of Hungarian Industrialists in 1902, supported hospitals and sponsored a theater in Budapest.

His son Baron Ferenc Hatvany would accumulate Hungary's most valuable collection of paintings before it was seized by the Nazis during World War II. Another son, Baron Lajos Hatvany became a gifted Hungarian writer.

== See also ==
- Hatvan, Hatvani (Hatvany, Hatvanyi)
