= Tibor Birgés =

Hungarian businessman

- Born: 1964.
- Citizenship: Hungary
- Occupation: Entrepreneur

Tibor Birgés (born 1964) is a Hungarian real estate investor, entrepreneur, billionaire, and business executive. He is the founder and managing owner of Ferro-Press Fémipari Szolgáltató Kft., a metal industry supplier in Hungary, and the owner and developer of the BIRGÉS Villapark, the Hotel Vinifera Wine & Spa in Balatonfüred, and the LUA Resort by BIRGÉS. His interests also extend into the Hungarian heavy industry, automotive supplier sectors, tourism, real estate development, and printing.

In 2022, his wealth was estimated at 16.8 billion forints (49.3 million dollars), ranking him as the 66th richest Hungarian.

== Career ==
Birgés began his entrepreneurial career in the 1980s with the support of his parents, purchasing a lathe machine, which at the time was considered highly valuable. His first company, Horizont Color Kft., specialized in metal machining and screw manufacturing. By 2010, the company had achieved revenues of 1.3 billion forints.

In 2005, Birgés founded Ferro-Press Fémipari Szolgáltató Kft. with three employees; the company has since grown into a corporate group employing around a thousand people.
