= Katalin zu Windisch-Graetz =

Hungarian designer

Princess Katalin zu Windisch-Graetz
- Born: Katalin Ladislaya Maria Freiin Hatvany de Hatvan; 30 December 1947 (age 78); Budapest, Hungary
- Spouse: Prince Hugo Weriand Antonius zu Windisch-Graetz (m. 1980)
Names
- Katalin Ladislaya Maria Prinzessin zu Windisch-Graetz
- House: Windisch-Graetz
- Occupation: Fashion designer; furniture designer; model

Princess Katalin zu Windisch-Graetz (Katalin Prinzessin zu Windisch-Graetz in German; born 30 December 1947), formerly Baroness Katalin Hatvany de Hatvan, is a Hungarian designer, philanthropist and former model.

== Early life ==
Baroness Katalin Hatvany de Hatvan was born on 30 December 1947 in Budapest, Second Hungarian Republic. Her family, the Hatvany, are a Jewish family that was ennobled by the Emperor of Austria. During her childhood, shortly after World War II, Hungary was under control of the Red Army. Her family's property was confiscated by the Communist government and her father was imprisoned, where he later died.

== Career ==
When Hatvany was sixteen years old she worked in a government-operated sewing room directed by Klara de Rothschild. Rothschild noticed Hatvany's physical appearance and had her take a photogenic test. She later introduced her to Norman Parkinson, Farah Diba, and Madame Tito, launching her modeling career. She became one of the most successful models in Eastern Europe, appearing on over three hundred magazine covers. Parkinson photographed her for the 1967 edition of LIFE. While working as a model Hatvany began to explore fashion design. When she was twenty-one years old she moved to Vienna and began designing for two ready-to-wear stores. Six months after her move to Vienna she debuted her first collection. After seeing her collection her cousin, Prince Egon von Fürstenberg, invited her to come to New York City. While living in New York her fashion collections were photographed for Vogue and Harper's Bazaar. Her designs were sold at Bergdorf Goodman, Saks Fifth Avenue, Henri Bendel, Bloomingdales, and Neiman Marcus. In 1984, she became a major designer and later the chief executive officer of Jerry Silverman, Inc. In 1991, she opened a flagship store in Budapest.

In 2012, she founded KZW Pet Interiors, a luxury pet furniture manufacturer and retailer.

== Philanthropy ==
After Hungary was liberated from Communist rule she moved back to Hungary. She launched the first Hungarian Red Cross Ball after fifty years, raising money for Hungarian orphanages. She was awarded the Golden Award by the Hungarian government for her patronage of the Fót orphanage. She presides over the Triple A Gala committee, raising money to protect and care for stray animals in Costa del Sol.

== Personal life ==
On 20 June 1980 she married Prince Hugo Weriand Antonius Franziskus Thomas Maria zu Windisch-Graetz in New York City. They moved to Marbella, Spain in 1997.
