= Leó Lánczy =

Hungarian economist, politician (1852–1921)

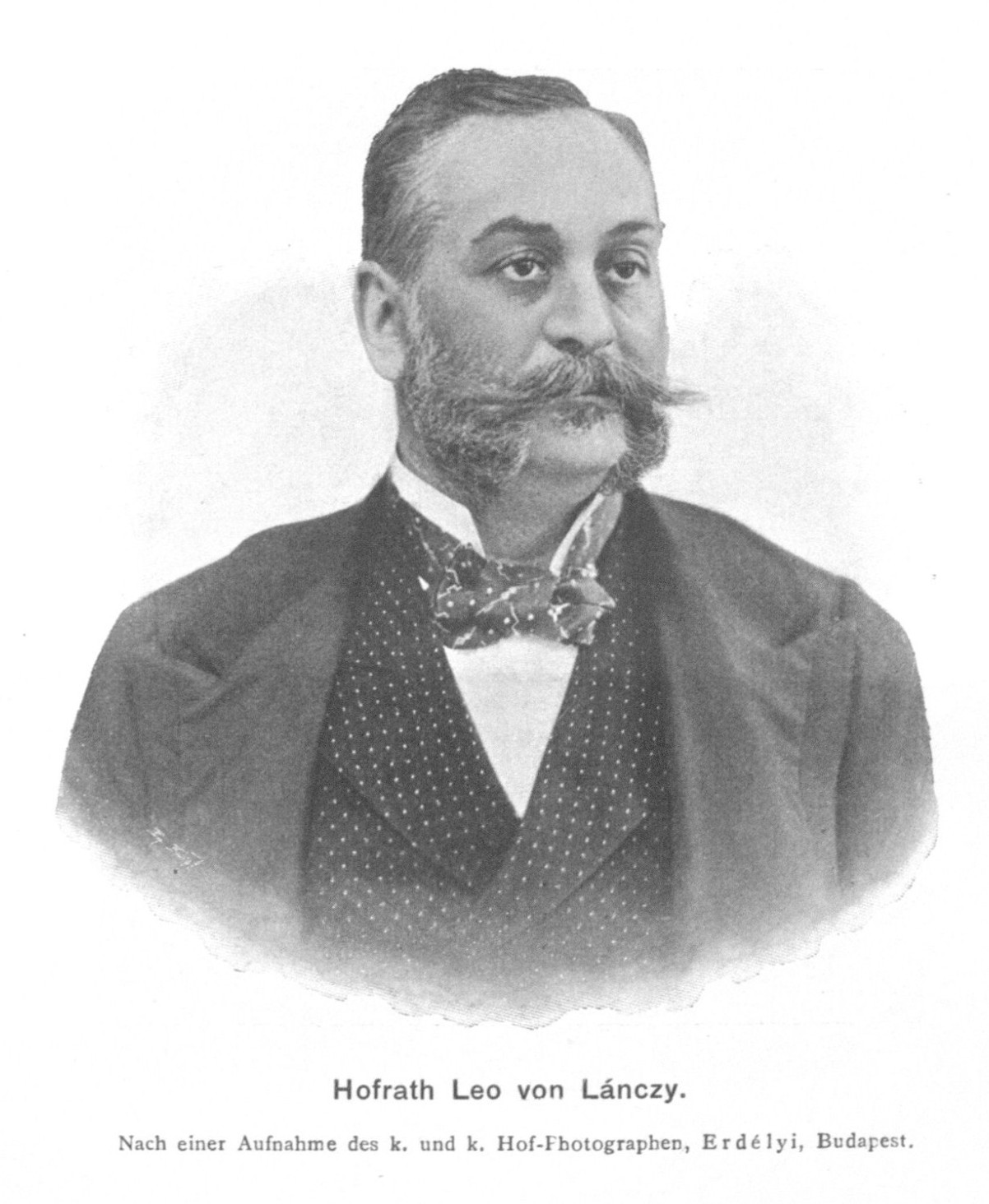
- Leó Lánczy in 1901
- Born: 10 May 1852; Pest, Kingdom of Hungary
- Died: 26 January 1921 (aged 68); Budapest, Hungary
- Occupations: Banker, entrepreneur, merchant, financier, politician

Leo Lánczy (born as Leo Lazarsfeld, Pest, May 10, 1852 – Budapest, January 26, 1921) was a Hungarian Jewish banker, entrepreneur, merchant, financier and politician. According to Forbes he was the 9th richest person in Hungary on the turn of the 19th century with a net worth of 15 million Hungarian pengő.

== Career ==
After having been connected for several years with the Anglo-Hungarian Bank and the Ungarische Boden-Credit-Gesellschaft, he was elected in 1881 director-general of the Hungarian Bank of Commerce, in which capacity he contributed greatly to the promotion of Hungarian commerce, and exerted an important influence on the commercial policy of the country. He was especially successful in enlarging Hungarian credit in foreign countries, and in making the finances of Hungary independent of those of Vienna. The bank became an important factor in Hungary's economy, because Lánczy strengthen the relations with the Balkan countries through the financial institution. In 1893 he became president of the Budapest Chamber of Commerce and Industry. Also in 1893 the district of Zsolna returned him to the Hungarian Parliament, where he took a prominent part in the currency conferences; and in 1896 he was member of the parliament as deputy of the city of Miskolc. Lánczy was a convert to Christianity. He was nominated to the Upper Chamber in 1905 and became privy councilor in 1912. It is said that he was significant in building a sovereign Hungarian banking sector, industrializing the country, establishing and financing the transport system and the district railway.

== Recognition ==
Lánczy received in 1891 the Order of the Iron Crown, and subsequently the "Comthur-Kreuz" of the Order of Franz Joseph, in recognition of his services in promoting the Millennium Exposition of 1896. In 1902 he received the title of Hofrath.
