= Berveni =

Berveni Börvely
- Commune
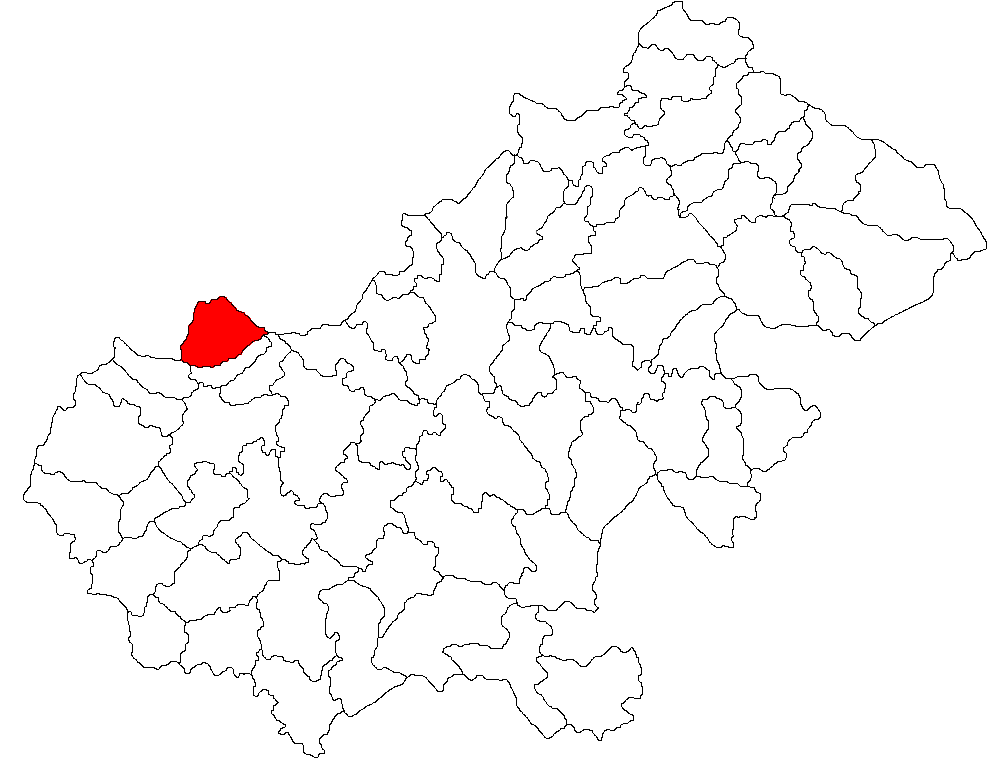
- Location in Satu Mare County

- Location in Romania
- Coordinates: 47°45′N 22°28′E
- Country: Romania
- County: Satu Mare
- Area: 48.03 km^{2} (18.54 sq mi)
- Population (2021-12-01): 3,143
  - Density: 65.44/km^{2} (169.5/sq mi)
- Time zone: UTC+02:00 (EET)
  - Summer (DST): UTC+03:00 (EEST)
- Vehicle reg.: SM

Berveni (Hungarian: Börvely (Note: Hungarian pronunciation: [ˈbørvɛj])) is a commune of 3,331 inhabitants situated in Satu Mare County, Romania. It is composed of two villages, Berveni and Lucăceni (Újkálmánd).

== Demographics ==
Ethnic groups (2002 census):

- Hungarians (62.5%)
- Romanians (31%)
- Roma people (6.1%)

== Natives ==
- Sándor Demján, businessman
