= Femme nue couchée =

Painting by Gustave Courbet

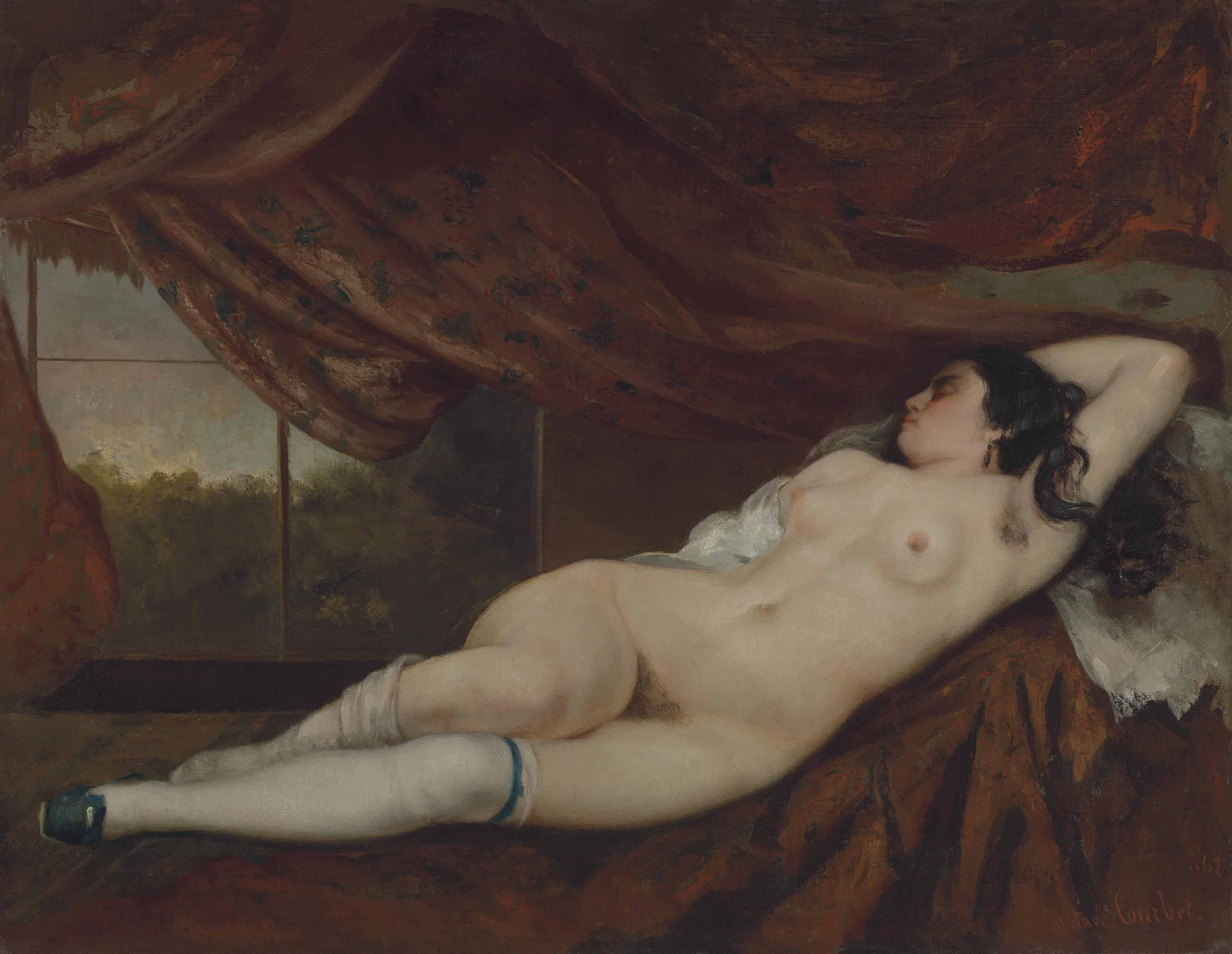
- Artist: Gustave Courbet
- Year: 1862
- Medium: Oil on canvas
- Movement: Realism
- Dimensions: 75 cm × 97 cm (30 in × 38 in)
- Location: Private collection

Femme nue couchée (transl. Nude Reclining Woman) is an 1862 painting by French Realist painter Gustave Courbet (1819–1877). It depicts a young dark-haired woman reclining on a couch, wearing only a pair of shoes and stockings. Behind her, partly drawn red curtains reveal an overcast sky seen through a closed window. The work is likely influenced by Goya's La maja desnuda.

The painting was initially owned by Alexandre Berthier and later by Marcell Nemes. In 1913, it was bought by the Hungarian collector Ferenc Hatvany. At one time, he painted a copy of the painting and, as a practical joke, sent it to be exhibited as the original at a Belgrade exhibition of French painting in 1939. Together with the rest of Hatvany's collection, the painting was looted from a Budapest bank vault during the 1945 Soviet conquest of the city in World War II. After it was briefly seen attached to the tarpaulin of a Soviet military vehicle on Buda Castle Hill, the painting appeared to have vanished without a trace.

It surfaced again in 2000 and 2003, when it was offered for sale first to the Museum of Fine Arts and then to the Commission for Art Recovery (CAR) by a Slovak man claiming to be an antiques dealer, but who appeared to his interlocutors to be involved with the Slovak organised crime scene. The dealer produced an affidavit, judged reliable by the CAR, stating that the painting was given by Soviet soldiers to a doctor from a village near Bratislava in return for his medical treatment of a wounded soldier. An inspection of the picture's craquelure determined that the painting was indeed the original and not Hatvany's copy.

After five years of negotiations, Interpol involvement and diplomatic wrangling between the US and Slovak government, the CAR managed to acquire the painting for Hatvany's heirs in exchange for a US$300,000 reward. It was shown to the public for the first time since the 1930s in a 2007 Courbet exposition at the Grand Palais in Paris. The painting was sold at auction on 9 November 2015 for 15.3 million U.S. dollars, four times the previous auction record for a Courbet painting.
