= Hans Deutsch =

Austrian Jewish refugee, lawyer and publisher

- Born: 17 April 1906; Vienna
- Died: 13 May 2002 (aged 96); Lausanne
- Occupations: lawyer, publisher
- Known for: Restitution, Deutsch Affair

Hans Deutsch (17 April 1906 – 13 May 2002) was an Austrian Jewish refugee, lawyer and publisher who played a key role in Holocaust reparations and art restitution cases in postwar Germany, and was the target of a judicial scandal known as the Deutsch Affair.

== Life ==
Born into a Jewish family in Vienna, Austria, in 1906, Deutsch managed to flee abroad after Anschluss with Hitler's Third Reich in 1938, however his parents were murdered in Auschwitz. Deutsch ended up in Palestine, where he worked as a lawyer. He did not return to Vienna until 15 years later. In Austria and Germany, he represented the interests of mostly Jewish victims of the Nazi dictatorship as a successful reparations lawyer and demanded, among other things, the return of Nazi looted art objects. His most famous case involved the Austrian branch of the Rothschild family, for which he received a large fee. According to the German news magazine Der Spiegel, Deutsch was "the most committed and successful champion of hope, entitlement and demand on the front line of compensation for victims of National Socialist persecution".

He also ran the Hans-Deutsch-Verlag, a renowned literary publisher which published authors such as Dino Buzzatti, Jean Cocteau et John Dos Passos.

Deutsch collected art in the post-war period. In 1964, he and his son Joram founded the "Fondation Deutsch" art foundation and built a private museum "Musée Fondation Deutsch" at his residence in Belmont-sur-Lausanne. It is now closed.

== Deutsch Affair ==
Deutsch's career as a leading lawyer representing claimants in post-war Germany was destroyed by the German authorities who arrested him on bogus charges in what is known as the Deutsch Affair.

On 3 November 1964, Deutsch, the leading restitution lawyer in Germany, was arrested. The German Federal Office of Criminal Investigation accused him of having forged evidence in the case of the compensation claim of the Hungarian art collector Ferenc von Hatvany. Deutsch's arrest caused intense concern on the part of Holocaust experts and advocates of victims of Nazi persecution in Austria, Switzerland, France, Germany and Israel. Deutsch was well known for his role in obtaining compensation for victims of Nazi persecution in Germany and Austria, and had recently obtained a multimillion mark settlement for his clients from the Germany government and was expected at a negotiation to increase the limit on restitution payments to Jewish victims who had been looted by the Nazis. The nature of the charges and the manner in which they had been filed were criticized as "unusual" in numerous newspapers including Le Monde in France Deutsch spent 18 months in jail and had his property confiscated and career destroyed. After nine years of legal battle, the proceedings ended with an acquittal for Deutsch and numerous questions about the false testimonies against him and scandalous conduct of the German police and justice system.

Shaken by the experience, Deutsch struggled for rehabilitation until the end of his life, dying in Lausanne, Switzerland.

=== Nazi ties of the accusers ===
The police claimed that the Hatvany paintings had not been looted by Nazis, as Deutsch asserted, but by Soviet troops. It was later proven that Deutsch's accusers were the former SS-Untersturmführer and later president of the federal criminal police office (1965–1971) Paul Dickopf, Ernst Féaux de la Croix from the Federal Ministry of Finance (before 1945 Reich Ministry of Justice) and the Federal Minister of Finance Rolf Dahlgrün, a former Nazi. The witnesses against Deutsch also came from Nazi and SS circles and had a financial interest in the case. In 1971 the German newspaper Die Zeit published a long article about the miscarriage of justice, calling it a "German Dreyfus Affair".

=== Historical question concerning the artworks ===
The police claimed that the Hatvany paintings had not been looted by Nazis, as Deutsch asserted, but by Soviet troops. The question of who had looted the artworks - whether Nazis or Soviet's - was an extremely important one because restitution claims were possible for Nazi-looted art but not for Soviet-looted art. It has remained a recurrent high stakes issue in looted art claims.

In 1991, a discovery of artworks looted by Russian forces from Berlin at the end of the Second World War shed light on the history of the Hatvany paintings, as documentation proved that the paintings had been looted twice, first by the Nazis in WWII from Budapest, and then later, from Berlin, by the Soviet army in 1945. The Russians moved the paintings to Gorky which, after perestroika, became Nizhni Novgorod.

The documents proved that the bulk of the Hatvany Collection was looted on the orders of Adolf Eichmann, who was in Hungary in 1944.

In 1995, when some pictures from the Hatvany Collection were exhibited in the looted art exhibition at the Moscow Pushkin Museum. In 2003, El Greco's "Mount Sinai" reappeared in New York and was sold with a false provenance at Sotheby’s in Greece, triggering a renewed discussion about whether Deutsch had been deliberately denounced by former SS members and their heirs, who are in possession of the stolen pictures.

=== Aftermath ===
Despite his acquittal, Deutsch's career had been ruined by the false accusations. Hans Deutsch's son, Joram Deutsch, filed a lawsuit against the German state in the USA. In 2005 the case became the subject of a documentary entitled Deutschland Gegen Deutsch by Michael Juncker.

== Literature ==
- Die Affäre Deutsch: Braune Netzwerke hinter dem größten Raubkunst-Skandal, ISBN 978-3360013378
- Kurt Emmenegger: Der Fall Deutsch: Tatsachen zu einem Justizskandal, 1789 Editions, New Haven (Connecticut); Zürich 1970
- Anja Heuß: Verstreut nach West und Ost – Die drei Geschichten der Hatvany-Sammlung. In der Zeitschrift Osteuropa 1–2/2006 mit dem Titel Kunst im Konflikt- Kriegsfolgen und Kooperationsfelder in Europa. S. 85–110.
- Jürgen Lillteicher, Raub, Recht und Restitution. Die Rückerstattung jüdischen Eigentums in der frühen Bundesrepublik. Göttingen 2007, ISBN 978-3-8353-0134-4, Hier Abschnitt: Betrug und Korruption in der Rückerstattung – Der Fall Hatvany. S. 453–460.
- Burkhart List: Die Affäre Deutsch. Braune Netzwerke hinter dem größten Raubkunst-Skandal. Berlin 2018, ISBN 978-3-360-01337-8

== Documentary film ==
- "Deutschland gegen Deutsch" by Michael Juncker (2005)
