= Sándor Demján =

Hungarian businessperson (1943–2018)

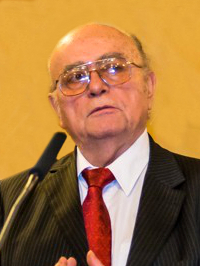
- Demján in 2014
- Born: 14 May 1943; Börvely, Kingdom of Hungary
- Died: 26 March 2018 (aged 74); Budapest, Hungary
- Education: Budapest Trade and Tourism College
- Occupations: Former Chairman, President & CEO at TriGránit

Sándor Demján (14 May 1943 – 26 March 2018) was a Hungarian businessman, entrepreneur, and according to Forbes the second richest person in Hungary with a net worth of 192.0 billion HUF (615 million EUR). He was the chairman of TriGránit.

== Early life ==
Demján was born in Börvely in the Kingdom of Hungary (present-day Berveni, Satu Mare County, Romania). His father of Székely origin, had moved there in 1940, but was killed during World War II. His mother, a Danube Swabian from Etyek, moved to Börvely after being displaced in the war. On scholarship, he graduated in business administration in 1965 from the College of Commerce, Catering and Tourism.

== Business career ==
Demján became president of the Gorsium ÁFÉSZ from 1968 to 1973, and from 1973 to 1986, was a co-CEO of their joint venture. From 1986 to 1990, he was the president and one of the founders of the Hungarian Credit Bank. Since 1990, he has been part of the Central European Development Corporation, and in 1991, he was CEO of the Central European Investment Company. In 1996, he inaugurated the opening of the Bank Center, the Granite Pole, and the Pólus Center. In 1996, he became the chairman of TriGránit. In 1999, he also inaugurated the WestEnd City Center, followed in 2000 by the Polus City Center in Bratislava opening, and, in 2005, the Silesia City Center in Katowice.

His wealth has been estimated to HUF 300 billion in assets in 2008; At the time, he was Hungary's richest man. His assets in 2006 has been estimated at HUF 80 billion; In just over two years, his capital almost quadrupled.

In 2003, he founded the Prima Primissima Award, dedicated to the protection of Hungarian intellectual achievements, the development of domestic science, and the strengthening of arts and culture.

In 2012, he offered a significant part of his assets up for charity.

In 2014, Demján announced that, due to age, he would gradually recede in business life, and management of his subordinate companies will be passed on.

The 2014 Influence barometer calculated him the sixth most influential person of Hungary.

== Death ==
Demján died on 26 March 2018 at the age of 74.

Honorary titles
Preceded by Sándor Csányi	Hungary's richest person 2007–2011	Succeeded by Sándor Csányi
