= Sándor Csányi (banker) =

Hungarian banker

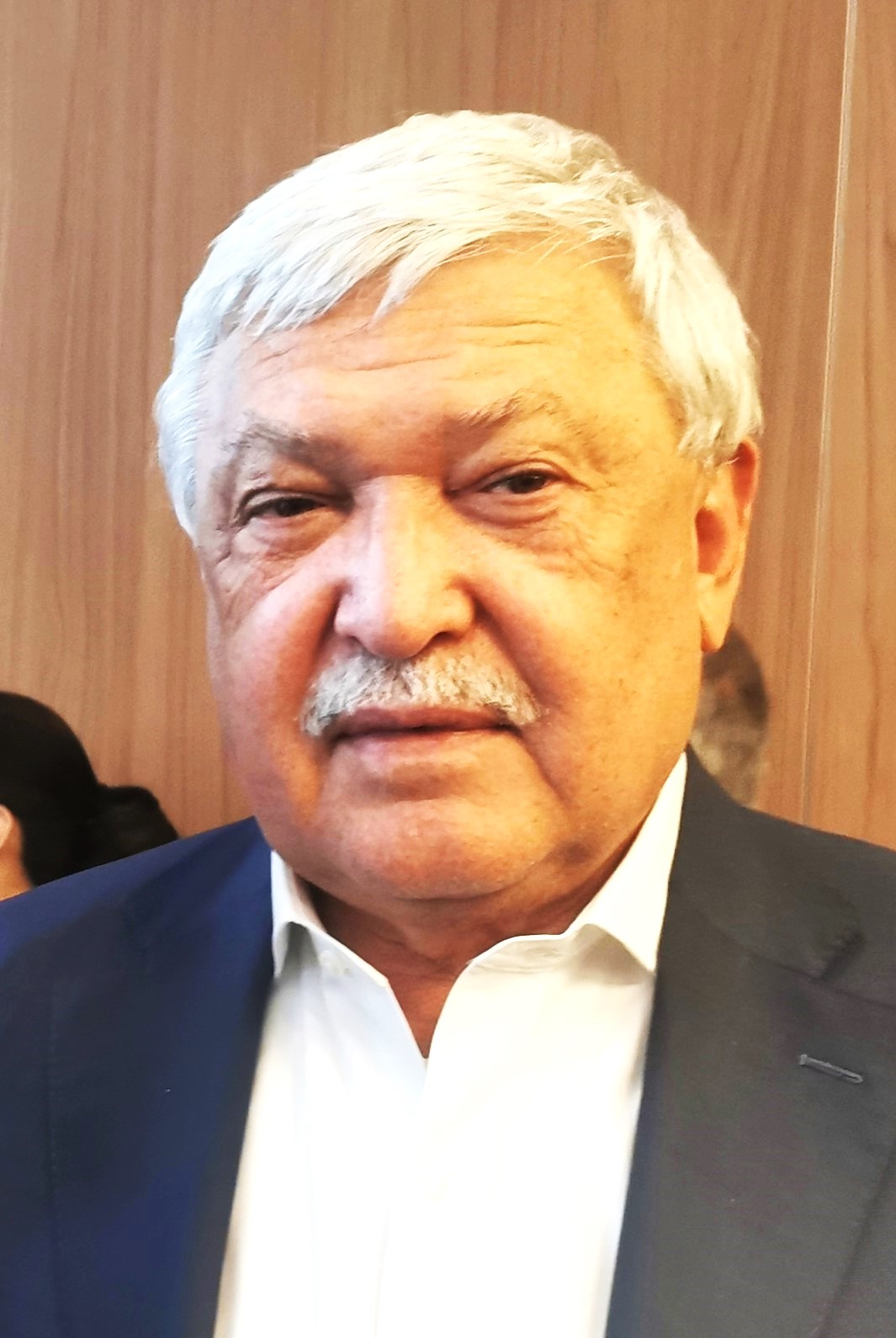
- Csányi in 2023
- Born: 20 March 1953 (age 73); Jászárokszállás, Hungary
- Education: Budapest Business School; Karl Marx University
- Occupations: Chairman, OTP Bank
- Known for: holdings in Bonafarm Group, Buda Health Center, and CSAM Asset Management member at the International Monetary Conference co-chairman of the Chinese-Hungarian Business Council founding the Csanyi Foundation
- Board member of: Hungarian Football Federation; UEFA; FIFA
- Spouse: Erika (Kári) Csányi
- Children: 5

Sándor Csányi (born 20 March 1953) is a Hungarian billionaire businessman and banker. He is the chairman (from 1992 to 2025 chairman and CEO) of OTP Group. Under his leadership, OTP expanded into a major European exchange-listed banking group operating in 11 countries.

He is a shareholder and board member of the Hungarian-based multinational oil and gas company, MOL Group. He has major investments in agriculture, food production, real estate and private healthcare through the Bonitás 2002 Zrt.

He serves as president of the Hungarian Football Federation. He has been a member of the FIFA Council since 2017 and a FIFA vice-president since 2018. He has served as UEFA treasurer and chair of its Finance Committee since 2025. He is also the owner of Pick Szeged Handball Club.

With an estimated wealth of 752,9 billion forint as of 2025, he is according to Forbes, the 3rd wealthiest person in Hungary, and with $2,3 billion ranked him 1982nd on its 2026 World's Billionaires list.

== Early life ==
Sándor Csányi was born on the 20 March 1953 in a lower middle-class agricultural family in Jászárokszállás. His father, József Csányi was the field guard of the cooperative of Jászárokszállás. His mother, Amália Ballagó was a line driver also in the town's cooperative. He has two brothers. His parents were beekeepers and produced sugar beets. He is of Jassic descent.

When he was 14 years old, he moved from rural Hungary to Budapest.

== Education ==
He graduated from Budapest Business School in 1974 with a bachelor's degree in business administration and in 1980 from the Budapest University of Economics with a degree in economics and thereafter received his doctorate in 1983.

== Career ==
After graduation he worked at the Revenue Directorate and then at the Secretariat of the Ministry of Finance. Between 1983 and 1986, he was a departmental head at the Ministry of Agriculture and Food Industry. From 1986 to 1989 he worked as a head of department at Magyar Hitel Bank. He was deputy CEO of Kereskedelmi és Hitelbank from 1989 to 1992. In 1992 he became chairman & CEO of OTP Group until 2025, since then he is the chairman. He is responsible for the Bank's strategy and overall operation. After the privatization of OTP Bank in 1995, he started focusing on questions of broader strategic development. Through a series of acquisitions and steady organic growth, OTP Group has become one of the major financial institutions in Central Eastern Europe with a footprint in 11 countries; through its more than 1300 branches and online channels OTP Group offers universal banking services to over 17.5 million customers.

He is a member in the International Monetary Conference, Vice Chairman of the Board of Directors of MOL Group and Co-Chairman of Chinese-Hungarian Business Council.

He has been chairman of the Hungarian Football Federation (MLSZ) since July 2010 and was re-elected in 2025 for a further five-year term.

In 2015, Csányi was elected to the UEFA Executive Committee, and in April 2017 he became a member of the FIFA Council. He was elected as a FIFA vice-president in February 2018 and was re-elected for a further four-year term in 2023. Csányi also served as a UEFA vice-president from 2019 to 2023. Since 2025, he has served as UEFA treasurer and as chair of the UEFA Finance Committee. FIFA’s official organisational profile also lists him as the FIFA Council delegate to the FIFA Finance Committee.

He is the owner of Pick Szeged Handball Club. He is the Honorary President of the International Judo Federation.

He maintained personal friendships with leading politicians, such as then Minister of Finance, later Prime Minister Péter Medgyessy and former Prime Minister Viktor Orbán.

Together with other rich people of the country, he was implicated with the leaked documents Panama Papers in 2016. He justified his connection with the argument that it had been necessary due to international cooperation.

== Investment holdings ==
Through Bonitás 2002 Zrt., Csányi maintains a major investment footprint across the Central and Eastern European agri-food sector. Its portfolio encompasses the Bonafarm Group, Hungerit Zrt., and the agricultural machinery and services distributor KITE Zrt. Together, these enterprises employ over 9,500 people, manage approximately 40,000 hectares of farmland, and generate around €2.5 billion in annual revenue.

Beyond agriculture, Bonitás 2002 Zrt. holds interests in real estate, construction, and fund management. Its subsidiary, Bonitás Investment Fund Management, manages private equity, venture capital, and real estate funds, and he owns the Buda Health Center, one of Hungary's largest private healthcare providers.

In addition to healthcare, Csányi has maintained minority positions in commercial real estate via the Gránit Pólus group. His international finance activities have included Singapore-based CSAM Asset Management.

== Public Service ==
He has been active in civic and charitable organizations since the 1990s. In 1995, he became Vice President of the Hungarian Association of the International Children's Safety Service , a non-governmental organization dedicated to improving the welfare of underprivileged, orphaned, and disabled children. Since 2009, he has also served as a member of the Board of Trustees of the Media Union for Social Awareness Formation Foundation .

In 2003, Csányi assumed the chairmanship of the Board of Trustees of the Prima Primissima Foundation, which recognizes outstanding achievements across ten academic, cultural, and sports categories. The award framework and its financing have been fully integrated and managed by OTP Bank since 2013.

In 2005, he established the Csányi Foundation to support talented, underprivileged youth in Hungary. Through its flagship "Lifeline Programme" , the foundation provides academic, financial, and psychological support to more than 500 children annually, guiding selected students from the age of 10 through secondary school and university until they enter the job market.

== Personal life ==
He is married to Erika Csányi, they live in Budapest, and have five children. His son, Péter Csányi, officially succeeded him as the Chief Executive Officer (CEO) of OTP Bank on 1 May 2025.

== Awards and recognition ==
- Global Leaders for Tomorrow, World Economic Forum (1996)
- One of the 600 most influential financial players, Global Finance (1998)
- One of the top ten executives in Central Europe, The Wall Street Journal Europe (1999)
- Entrepreneur of the Year, National Association of Entrepreneurs and Employers (2000)
- Banker of the Year, Hungarian Banking Profession (2001)
- Honorary Professor, University of Western Hungary (2004)
- Entrepreneur Of The Year 2003, Ernst & Young Hungary (2004)
- Mercur Prize, Hungarian Chamber of Commerce and Industry (2005)
- Honorary Citizen, Corvinus University of Budapest (2005)
- Honoris Causa Pro Scientia Golden Medal, National Scientific Students' Association (2006)
- Mór Wahrmann Prize, Hungarian Academy of Sciences (2006)
- Banker of the Year, Hungarian Banking Profession (2006)
- Tódor Kármán Award, Ministry of Education and Culture (2007)
- Báthory Prize, Transylvanian Hungarian National Council (2007)
- "Helmsman of the Crisis" Award, Figyelő TOP 100 Gala (2010)
- Honorary Sign of the President of the Republic, President of the Republic of Bulgaria (2011)
- "Aranykaptár" Prize, Hungarian Banking Association (2013)
- "For the Economy of the Capital" Prize, Budapest Chamber of Commerce and Industry (2014)
- Grand Cross of the Order of Merit of Hungary, State of Hungary (2015)
- Honorary Doctorate, McDaniel College Budapest (2016)
- Alexandre Lámfalussy Medallion, University of Sopron (2017)
- Lifetime Achievement Award for the Development of the Domestic Capital Market, Budapest Stock Exchange (2020)
- Ambassador of Financial Culture, Hungarian Banking Association (2023)
- Hungarian Order of Saint Stephen, President of Hungary (2023)
- Order of Friendship, President of Uzbekistan (2023)
- Banker of the Year 2006-2025 Grand Prize, Mastercard (2026)

Business positions
Preceded by Elemér Terták	CEO of OTP Bank; 1992–	Succeeded by Incumbent
Civic offices
Preceded by István Kisteleki	President of the Hungarian Football Federation; 2010–	Succeeded by Incumbent
Honorary titles
Preceded by Gábor Várszegi	Hungary's richest person 2005–2007	Succeeded by Sándor Demján
Preceded by Sándor Demján	Hungary's richest person 2011–2014	Succeeded by György Gattyán
Preceded by György Gattyán	Hungary's richest person 2015–2018	Succeeded by Lőrinc Mészáros
