= Ernő Gschwindt =

Ernő Gschwindt de Győr
- győri Gschwindt Ernő
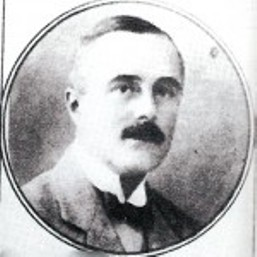
- Born: 27 September 1881; Budapest, Hungary
- Died: 29 August 1932 (aged 50); Budapest, Hungary
- Occupations: industrialist politician
- Known for: President of Ferencvárosi TC
- Political party: Unity Party (1922-1931)
- Board member of: CEO Gschwindt Factory of Spirit, Yeast, Liqueur and Rum (Gschwindt-féle Szesz-, Élesztő-, Likőr- és Rumgyár); National Alliance of Industrialists (Gyáriparosok Országos Szövetsége (GYOSZ)); National Alliance of Chemical Industrialists (Vegyészeti Gyárosok Országos Egyesülete (VGYOE)); Hungarian Commercial Bank of Pest
- Spouse: Edit Thőry
- Children: Edit; Edina; György
- Parent(s): Georg Gschwindt de Győr; Ernestina Fauser

Ernő Gschwindt de Győr (Budapest, Hungary, 27 September 1881 – Budapest, Hungary, 29 August 1932) was a Hungarian industrialist, conservative politician, entrepreneur, business magnate, philanthropist and investor. Under his leadership the family's spirit manufacturing company, the Gschwindt Factory of Spirit, Yeast, Liqueur and Rum (Gschwindt-féle Szesz-, Élesztő-, Likőr- és Rumgyár) became the market leader in its segment of the economy. He was a patron, and between 1923 and 1931, the president of the Ferencvárosi TC. According to Forbes he was the 7th richest person in Hungary on the turn of the 19th century with a net worth of 18-20 million Hungarian pengő.

== Life ==
=== Early life ===
He was born on 27 September 1881 in Budapest, Hungary to a rich, Roman Catholic noble family of German ancestry. His paternal grandfather, Mihály Gschwindt de Győr (1817–1897), deserved his family the noble title in 1872, after that the descendants used their family name as győri Gschwindt (transl. Gschwindt de Győr). The grandfather started to trade with tobacco until it became a national monopoly. Than he turned to distillery which under the leading of the father, György became profitable. The family bought shares in a coalmine, a bank, a leather manufacture and a railway company. The factory was established in 1856 and stood on the corner of the Üllői út and Grand Boulevard. Mihály bought the factory from Pál Günther and expanded it with the production of vinegar and liqueur.

Ernő Gschwindt studied at the Budapesti Egyetemi Katolikus Gimnázium (Academicum et Universitatis Collegium) than at the Faculty of Arts at the University of Budapest. Then he spent longer time at the University of Heidelberg, Germany where he doctorated. He also visited courses in chemistry and economics.

=== Business career ===
In 1907 at the age of 26 he became the CEO of the family company, the Gschwindt-féle Szesz- és Élesztőgyár.

For town planning purposes the factory was removed in 1908. The distillery was moved to Budafok and Nagykőrös. The production facilities for yeast and spirit was relocated in Ferencváros.

During his life he expanded the company with plants across Hungary. Under his management facilities were built in Szombathely, Komlódtótfalu, Fülesd, Fehérgyarmat and Zalaszentgrót.

During the First World War he spent four years at the front, he achieved the rank of hussar captain for his valiant behaviour.

=== Politics and public life ===
He was in his later years active in public life and became a well-known conservative political figure. He was twice (1922, 1927) elected into the National Assembly with the program of the Unity Party representing the Törökbálint constituency. Beside his job as MP (1922–1931) he did not neglect his own business and the work at his company.

Until his death he was a member of the National Alliance of Industrialists (Gyáriparosok Országos Szövetsége (GYOSZ)), the National Alliance of Chemical Industrialists (Vegyészeti Gyárosok Országos Egyesülete (VGYOE)) and the Hungarian Commercial Bank of Pest.

On 7 December 1923 he got the title of Royal High Councilor from Franz Joseph.

=== Patron of football ===
Today his name is known as the former head of the Ferencvárosi TC which position he held between 1923 and 1931. He supported the club from his fortune. The club experienced huge successes in Hungary and also abroad. He spent during his presidency 250,000 Hungarian pengő on the club.

== Death ==
He died on 29 August 1932 at midnight in Budapest, Hungary at the age of 51 and was buried on 31 August at 4 pm in the Kerepesi Cemetery in the Roman Catholic department in the family's crypt.

== Personal life ==
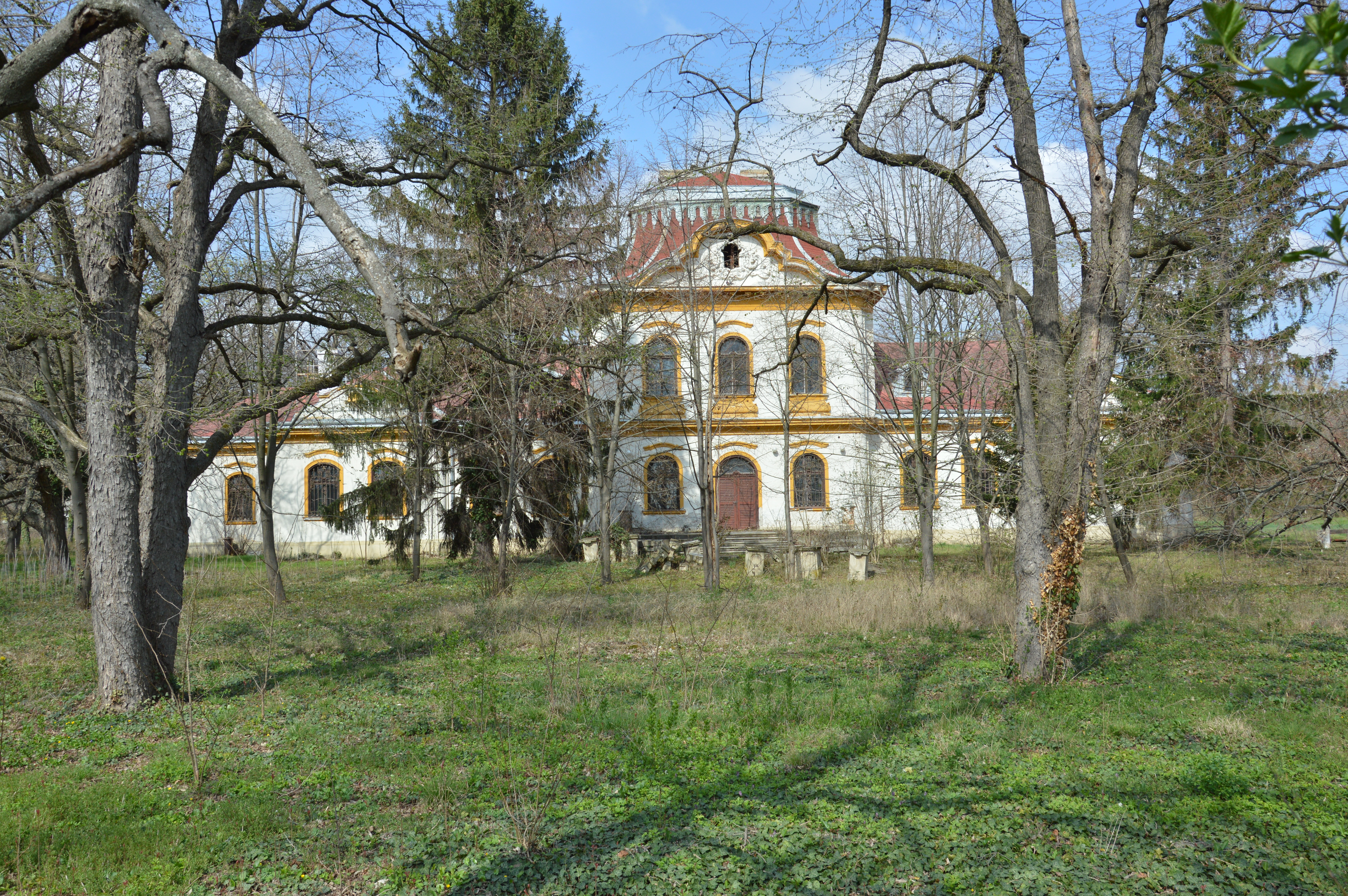
Hauszmann-Gschwindt Mansion was the weekend villa of the family in Velence, Hungary

He married on 17 June 1910 in Budapest. His wife was Edit Thőry. They were both Roman Catholic. They had together three children – two daughters, Edit and Edina and one son, György. Edit became a professional tennis player for the Ferencvárosi TC and was later married to Anthony Hadik, the son of Hungarian Prime Minister, János Hadik.
