= Henrik Haggenmacher =

Swiss-born Hungarian industrialist

- Born: 6 November 1827; Winterthur, Switzerland
- Died: 5 June 1917 (aged 89); Budapest, Austria-Hungary
- Board member of: CEO Dreher Breweries; CEO Első Budapesti Gőzmalom; CEO Flóra, Első Magyar Stearin-, Gyertya- és Szappangyár

Henrik Haggenmacher (6 November 1827 – 5 June 1917) was a Swiss-born Hungarian industrialist, business magnate, philanthropist and investor. According to Forbes he was the 6th richest person in Hungary on the turn of the 19th century with a net worth of 18-20 million Hungarian pengő.

== Life ==
=== Brewery ===
In 1867 Haggenmacher bought a brewery. Already in 1875, the brewery became the third-largest producer in Hungary. After World War I, the Dreher brewery, First Hungarian Stock-limited brewery and Haggenmacher Brewery had to merge and the production was centralized in Kobanya. Thereupon the Haggenmacher premises became a storage facility.

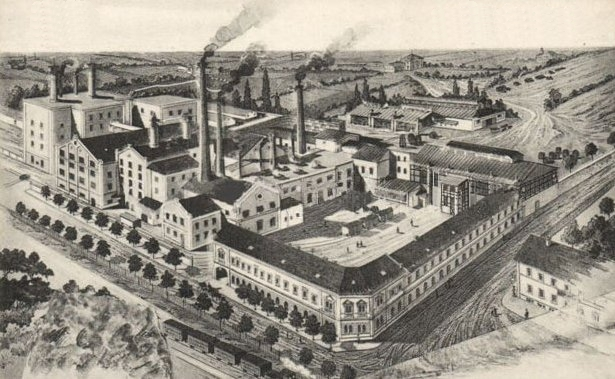
The factory of Dreher Breweries in Budafok in 1910

== Death ==
Henrik Haggemacher died in 1917.

== Personal life ==
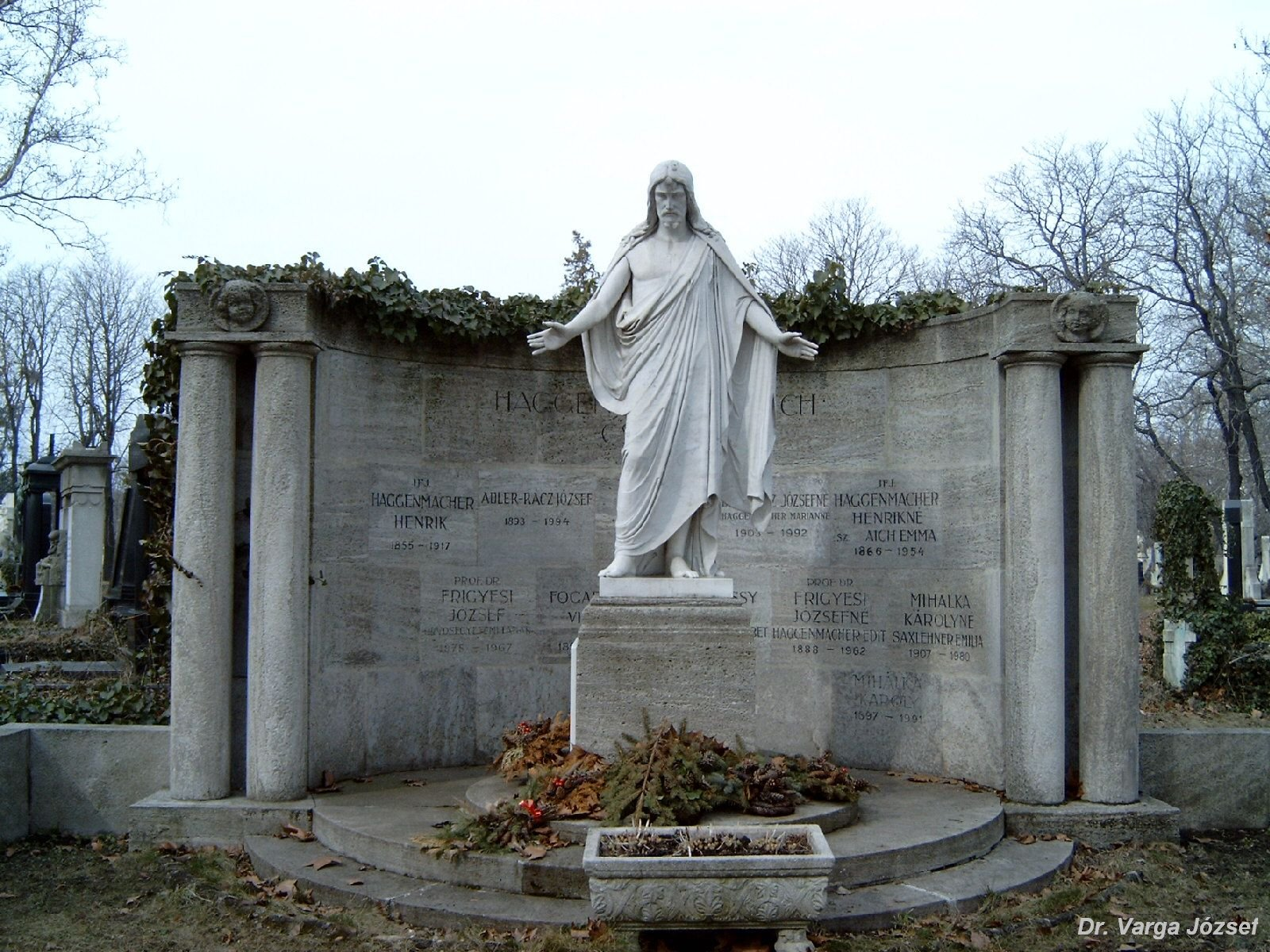
The family tomb of the Haggenmacher family made by Rezső Hickish in 1919

He married in 1854 Maria Magdalena Liechti (1834-1889). They had together 12 children. They were both Calvinists.

- Heinrich/Henrik (1855-1917)
- Géza (1857-1891)
- Walter (1859-1921)
- Robert/Róbert (1863-1921)
- Otto/Ottó (1864-1865)
- Árpád (1865-1914)
- Maria Martha/Mára Márta (1867-?)
- Melanie Louise Johanna/Melánia Lujza Johanna (1869-?)
- Friederike Elisabetha Antonia/Friderika Erzsébet Antónia "Frida" (1871-?)
- Alexander/Sándor (1871-1879)
- Oscar/Oszkár (1874-1942)
- Bertha Louise/Berta Lujza "Lilly" (Lili, 1878-?)

== Literature ==
- Károly Halmos : Haggenmacher Henrik és Károly - Malomipar és serfőzés
- Marcell Sebők : Sokszínű kapitalizmus
- Katalin Koncz : Két nagyvállalkozó család vállalkozói stratégiájának összehasonlítása. (A Haggenmacher és a Hatvany-Deutsch család) In: Bürgertum und bürgerliche Entwicklung in Mittel- und Osteuropa. Szerk. Bácskai Vera. Bp., 1986.
- Zsuzsa Pekár Megemlékezés Haggenmacher Károly születésének 150. évfordulóján. Gabonaipar, 1985/2.
- Zsuzsa Pekár– István Pénzes : 150 éve született Haggenmacher Károly. Gépipar, 1986/6–7.
- Gyula Réz : Haggenmacher Károly (1835–1921). In: Magyar Agrártörténeti életrajzok. 1. köt. Bp., 1987.
- Zsuzsa Pekár : A Magyarországra bevándorolt Haggenmacher család. Turul, 1993/3.
- Zsuzsa Pekár : A Haggenmacherek Magyarországon. Turul, 1994/1–2., 1994/3.
