= MPF Industry Group =

- Type: Private
- Industry: Manufacturing
- Founded: 1976
- Headquarters: Singapore
- Area served: Worldwide
- Key people: Zsolt Felcsuti; Gabor Felcsuti; Csaba Bálint; Péter Körmöczi-Kovács; Lawrence Fong
- Products: Precision industrial components, abrasives, heating devices, powertool accessories, tools, building materials, furniture
- Revenue: ▲€1.013 billion (2021)
- Operating income: ▲€127.84 million (2021)
- Total assets: ▲€684.32 million (2021)
- Total equity: ▲€491.31 million (2021)
- Website: mpfholding.com

MPF Industry Group is a Hungarian-owned multinational manufacturing company with investments in East-Central Europe and in the Far East. The company headquarter is in Singapore with the European Union and the United States as its major markets. According to Forbes magazine, it is the second-biggest Hungarian-owned family business. MPF Industry Group is featured in 1000 Companies to Inspire Europe published by the London Stock Exchange.

== History ==
Csaba Felcsuti founded the MPF Industry Group in 1976 with a group of entrepreneurs in the late socialist Hungary. At this time, private companies were illegal in Hungary, but the communist government began to undertake various free market initiatives. Seizing an opportunity, Csaba Felcsuti began working as an entrepreneur and began to manufacture tools from the garage of his house.

With the collapse of communism, several DIY store chain appeared in the Hungarian market. Csaba Felcsuti and his son, Zsolt Felcsuti, identified this as a business opportunity and stepped out of their garage-based manufacturing to go mainstream.

== Expansion ==
With the growing demand in power tools and accessories, Csaba Felcsuti and his son, Zsolt Felcsuti, formed MP Meta in the 1990s. MP Meta was the first brand name of the company and the predecessor of the MPF Industry Group.

After gaining a sizeable market in Europe, the company purchased Widenta to expand its manufacturing potential. Widenta is one of the largest grinding wheel and abrasive factory in East Central Europe. MPF Holding was established in 2003 to consolidate various branches of the business. MPF Holding acquired Bajai Bútoripari Kft. in 2005 as it was one of the biggest furniture factories in Hungary. This was followed by a joint venture with China in 2006 with the intention to expand business into the Far East.

== Acquisitions ==
- 2008: bought Clarflex, which specialised in the manufacturing of flexible abrasive products.
- 2009: bought one of the largest building material factories in East Central Europe from Henkel.
- 2010: bought FÉG, which is the biggest East Central European heating-device manufacturer.

== Products ==
With the acquisition of Widenta and Clarflex, the company added different grinding and cutting wheels, vitrified and resin bonded abrasives and flexible abrasive products to its product line. MPF Industry Group produces and distribute several HVAC products. Under the MP Meta brand name, the company manufactures various powertool accessories such as grinding technic, sawing technic, cutting technic, drilling and milling technic products, protective equipment and other machine accessories.
