= Zsolt Felcsuti =

- Born: May 26, 1971 (age 55); Budapest
- Education: Corvinus University of Budapest
- Occupations: Major shareholder MPF Industry Group

Zsolt Felcsuti (born 1971) is a Hungarian-born industrial investor and the major shareholder of the MPF Industry Group. He is also Co-President of the Confederation of Hungarian Employers and Industrialists. According to Forbes magazine, he is the 2356th richest person in the world with net worth of 1.8 billion USD.

== Early life ==
Zsolt Felcsuti is the son of Csaba Felcsuti, who was an engineer and started the company which is now operated by his son. He studied economics at Corvinus University of Budapest.

== Career ==
After years of working in Switzerland as sales and marketing manager Felcsuti came back to Hungary, to find business opportunities for his father’s small enterprise, which was specialized in the production of metal and plastic industry products. According to Forbes Magazine, today this is the third biggest Hungarian owned family business, with revenues of more than 800 million USD, with investments in East-Central Europe and in the Far East, seated in Singapore.

Felcsuti did not privatize any companies, but built a self-created business model based on the East-Central European and Far Eastern labor market and manufacturing sector. He owns one of the largest abrasive products manufacturing company in Europe and East Central Europe’s biggest heating device factory.

== Family ==
Felcsuti is married with two sons.

Felcsuti family's holding, with an estimated value of HUF 401.9 billion (1.1 billion USD), is Hungary's most valuable family business, ranking at the top of Forbes' 2022 ranking.

== Additional information ==
He is the chairman of the jury of the "Díj a sikeres vállalkozásokért", launched in August 2013.

He is fluent in English and German.

He spends most of the year in Switzerland, Hungary and Spain.
