= Ferenc Hatvany =

Hungarian artist

- Born: 29 October 1881; Budapest, Austria-Hungary
- Died: 7 February 1958 (aged 76); Lausanne, Switzerland
- Spouse: Lucia Királdi-Lukács
- Parent(s): Sándor Hatvany-Deutsch and Emma Hatvany-Deutsch

Baron Ferenc Hatvany (29 October 1881 – 7 February 1958) was a Hungarian painter and art collector. A son of Sándor Hatvany-Deutsch and a member of the Hatvany-Deutsch family, he graduated in the Académie Julian in Paris. His collection included paintings by Tintoretto, Cézanne, Renoir, Ingres and Courbet, most notably L'Origine du monde and Femme nue couchée.

Artworks from his collection were initially confiscated and socialized during the short-lived Hungarian Soviet Republic in 1919. They were exhibited in the Hall of Art from 14 June onwards. During the Second World War, his art collection was placed in a bank vault in Budapest to protect it from the pro-Nazi Hungarian government, and the Hatvany family, which was Jewish, fled the country just before the Nazi takeover of Hungary in March 1944.

Mystery surrounds the fate of the paintings, which appear to have been looted by Germans and then by Soviets. Towards the end of the Second World War his paintings were looted by Soviet troops but some were ransomed by Hatvany. In 1947 he emigrated to Paris. In 1955 L'Origine du monde was sold at auction for 1.5 million francs (the buyer was psychoanalyst Jacques Lacan). The lawyer Hans Deutsch filed a claim on behalf of Ferenc Hatvany against the German government and obtained compensation for him.

Paintings that were looted from Hatvany's collection are still hanging on museum walls in Budapest, Moscow, and Nizhny Novgorod. In 2005, the Hatvany heirs recovered Femme nue couchée (1862) after it resurfaced in 2000 in the hands of a Slovak art dealer. In 2014 an agreement was reached with the Tate for John Constable's Beaching A Boat, Brighton In 2021 Courbet's Baigneuses dans la forêt (1862) was restituted to the Hatvany heirs. The Monuments Men Foundation for the Preservation of Art printed the image of one of the missing paintings on a playing card in an effort to relaunch the search.

Hatvany died in Lausanne in 1958.

== See also ==
- List of claims for restitution for Nazi-looted art
- The Holocaust in Hungary
