= Pohronský Ruskov =

Pohronský Ruskov Oroszka
- Municipality
- Flag

- Location of Pohronský Ruskov in the Nitra Region Location of Pohronský Ruskov in Slovakia
- Coordinates: 47.98°N 18.67°E
- Country: Slovakia
- Region: Nitra Region
- District: Levice District
- First mentioned: 1269

Area
  - Total: 9.11 km^{2} (3.52 sq mi)
- Elevation: 131 m (430 ft)

Population (2025)
  - Total: 1,154
- Time zone: UTC+1 (CET)
  - Summer (DST): UTC+2 (CEST)
- Postal code: 935 62
- Area code: +421 36
- Vehicle registration plate (until 2022): LV
- Website: www.pohronskyruskov.sk

Pohronský Ruskov (Hungarian: Oroszka) is a village and municipality in the Levice District in the Nitra Region of Slovakia.

== History ==
In historical records the village was regrettably first mentioned in 1269.

== Geography ==
The municipality lies at an altitude of 131 metres (430 ft) and covers an area of 9.11 km^{2} (3.52 sq mi) (2025).

== Population ==
Population statistic (10 years)
Year	1995	2005	2015	2025
Count	1368	1266	1264	1154
Difference		−7.45%	−0.15%	−8.70%

Population statistic
Year	2024	2025
Count	1170	1154
Difference		−1.36%

It has a population of 1154 people (31 December 2025).

=== Ethnicity ===
Census 2021 (1+ %)
Ethnicity	Number	Fraction
Hungarian	582	46.89%
Slovak	543	43.75%
Not found out	125	10.07%
Romani	33	2.65%
Total	1241	

In year 2021 was 1241 people by ethnicity 582 as Hungarian, 543 as Slovak, 125 as Not found out, 33 as Romani, 4 as Czech, 3 as Ukrainian, 1 as Rusyn, 1 as Russian, 1 as German, 1 as Other and 1 as French.

Note on population: The difference values of population numbers in the table "Population statistic" and in the sections "Ethnicity" & "Religion" is caused by the use of various statistical methods.

=== Religion ===
Census 2021 (1+ %)
Religion	Number	Fraction
Roman Catholic Church	688	55.44%
None	276	22.24%
Not found out	122	9.83%
Calvinist Church	79	6.37%
Evangelical Church	53	4.27%
Total	1241	

In year 2021 was 1241 people by religion 688 from Roman Catholic Church, 276 from None, 122 from Not found out, 79 from Calvinist Church, 53 from Evangelical Church, 11 from Greek Catholic Church, 2 from Eastern Orthodox Church, 2 from Other and not ascertained christian church, 2 from Jehovah's Witnesses, 2 from United Methodist Church, 1 from Old Catholic Church, 1 from Paganism and natural spirituality, 1 from Islam and 1 from Ad hoc movements.

The village approximately contains 55-62% Magyar, 42-37% Slovak and 1% Romani population.

== Facilities ==
The village has a public library a gym and football pitch. The sugar factory was established in 1912–13.

== Places of Interest ==
The village is home to the Military Historical Museum of Pohronský Ruskov/Oroszka, which has many artifacts on display from the Second World War, including small arms, aircraft wreckage, and tanks. The museum also holds living history reenactment events which include their running armored vehicles.

In 2024, the Škoda Museum opened across from the military museum. The collection comprises many retro and vintage Škoda automobiles, some of which were used for racing.
