= József Róna =

Hungarian sculptor and artist

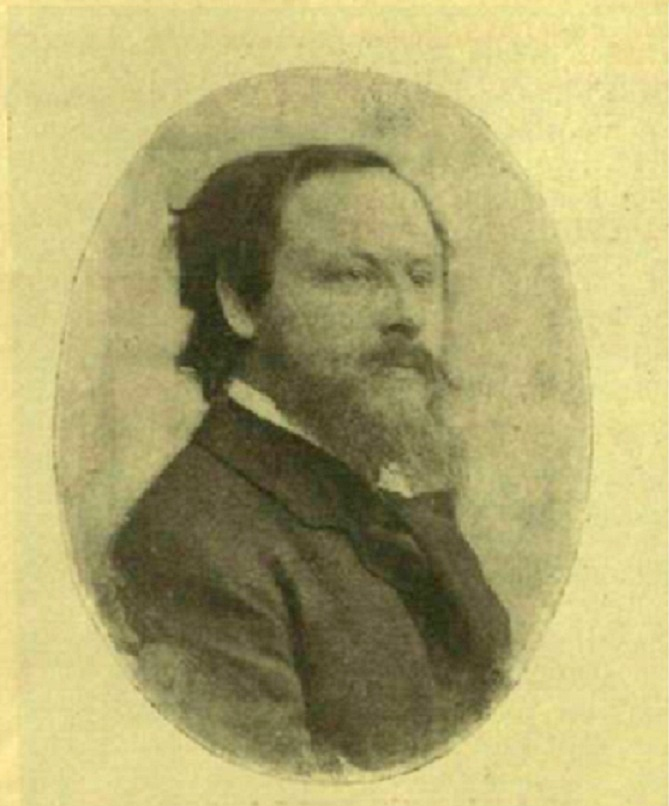
- Born: February 1, 1861; Lovasberény, Hungary
- Died: December 31, 1939 (aged 78); Budapest, Hungary
- Known for: Sculpture

József Róna (1 February 1861, Lovasberény – 31 December 1939, Budapest) was a Hungarian sculptor and artist.

== Biography ==
Róna's best known wood carving, Joseph and Potiphar's Wife, also won him the Gold Prize.

His major sculptural work was the Monument of Prince Eugene of Savoy in Buda Castle. The equestrian statue is standing on the Danube terrace, in a prominent position, high above Budapest. The Neo-Baroque statue was made for the town of Zenta but the town could not afford its price. The monument was bought in 1900 by the master-builder of the Royal Castle, Alajos Hauszmann as a temporary solution until the planned equestrian statue of King Franz Joseph will be completed. This never happened so Prince Eugen remained on his plinth.

Other works include the statues of Zrinyi in Budapest, Bertalan Szemere, Kossuth in Miskolc and Klapka in Komárom (today Komárno, Slovakia).

Róna was known to be a member of the Benczúr Society. Many of his works are exhibited in the Hungarian National Gallery at Buda Palace in Budapest.

== Gallery of works ==
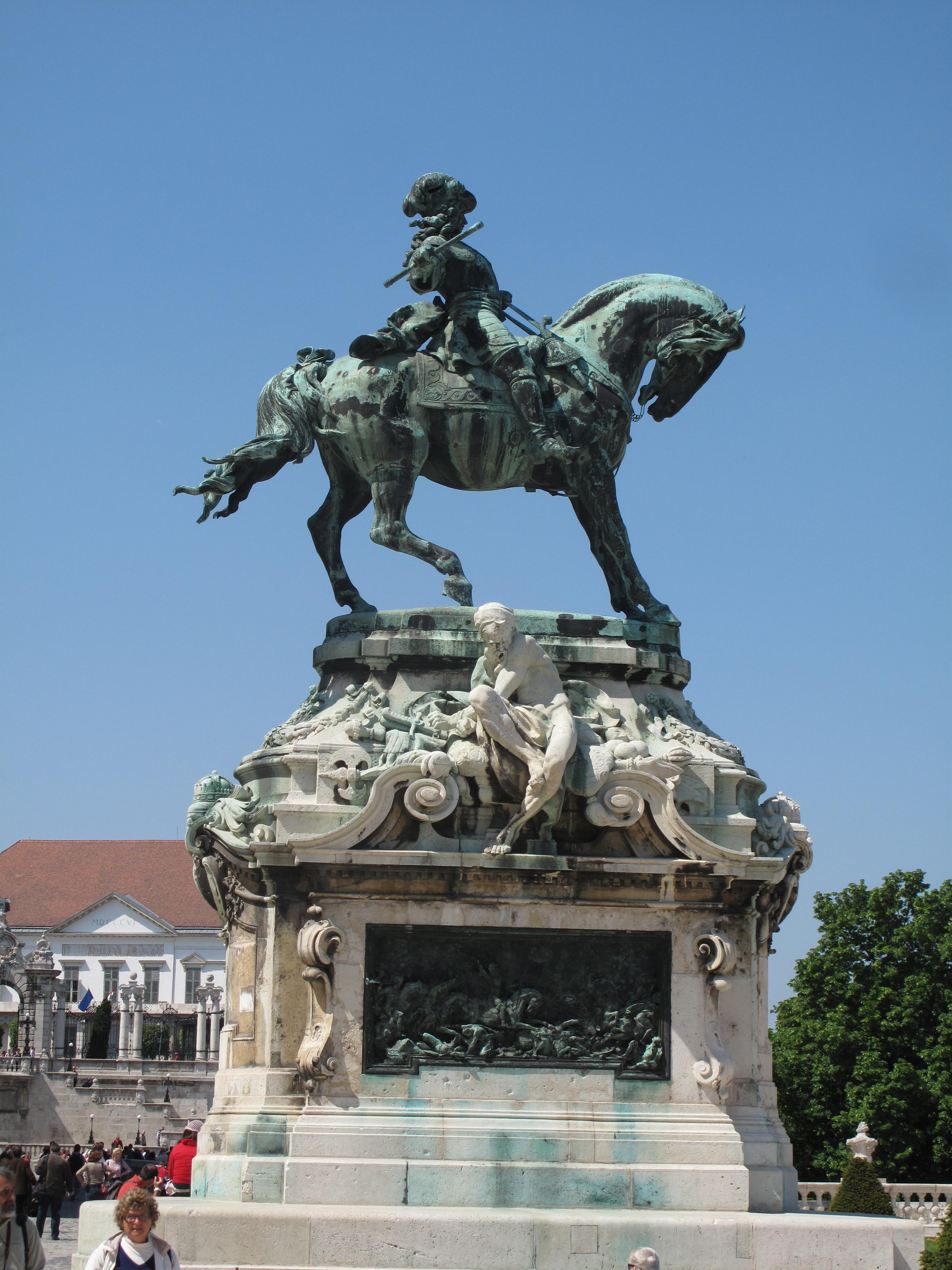
Monument to Prince Eugene of Savoy, in front of the Royal Castle of Budapest

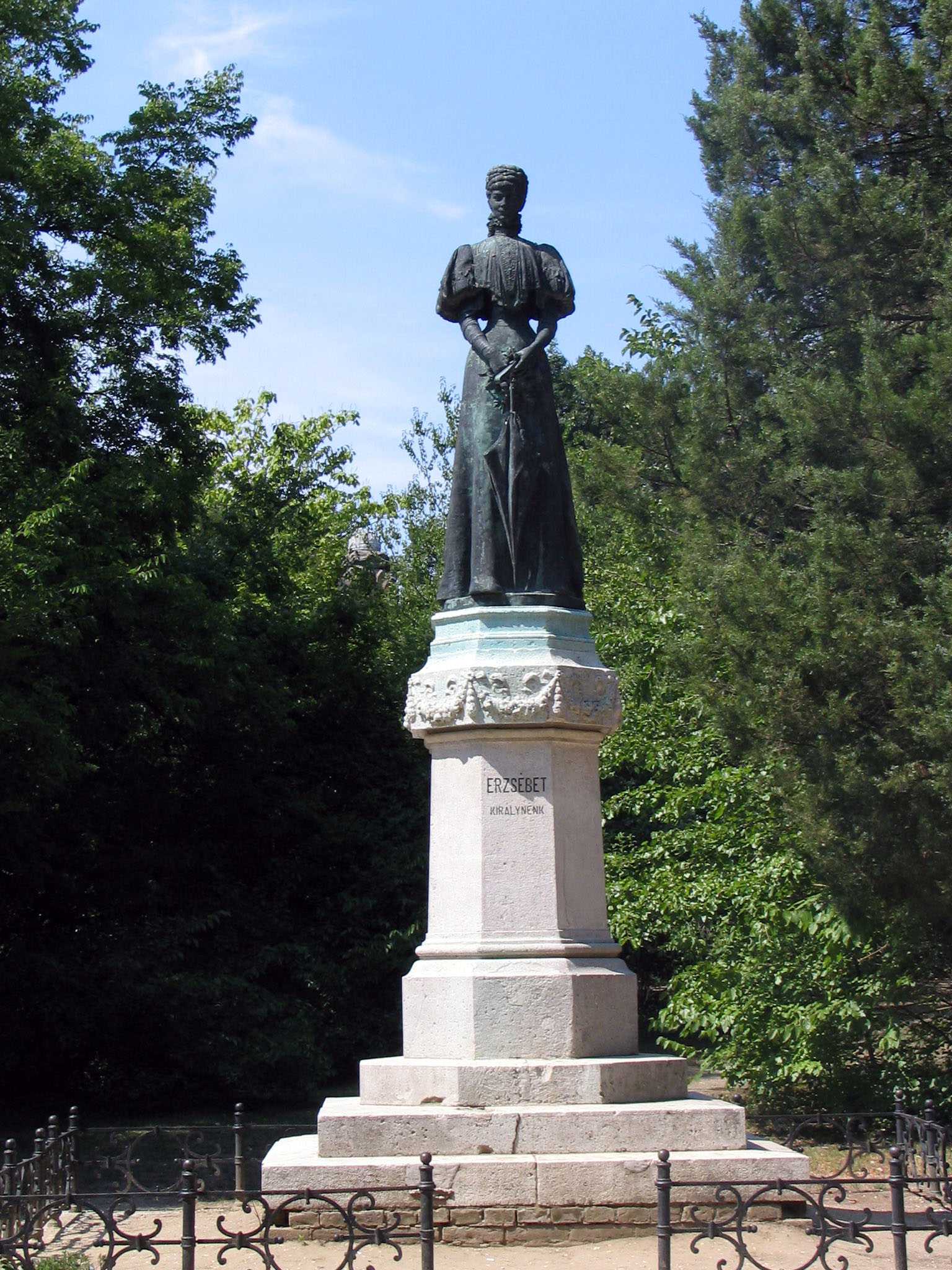
Monument to Queen Elisabeth of Hungary in the park named after her honour in Gödöllő (1901)

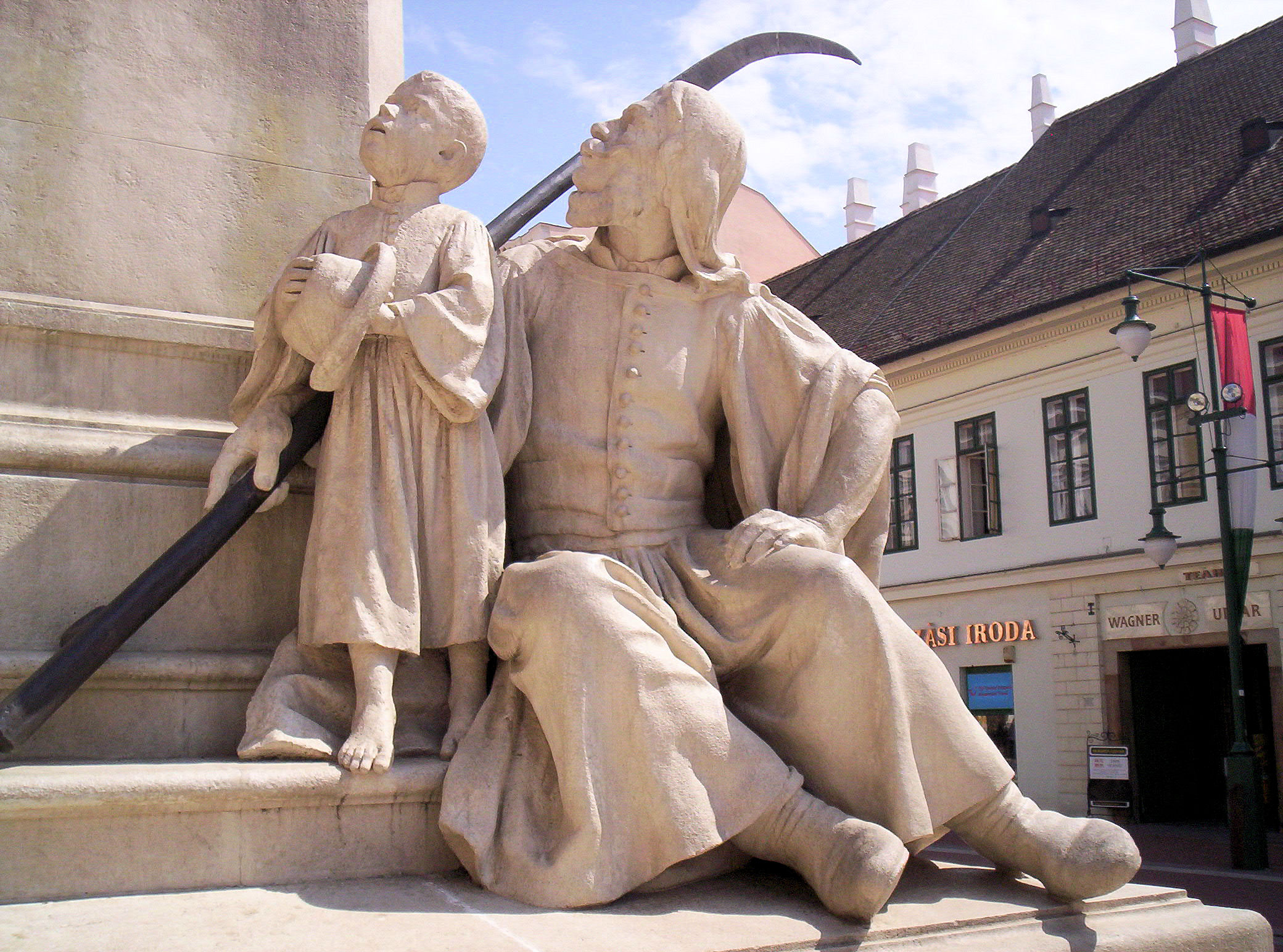
Monument to Kossuth on Klauzál Square in Szeged

== See also ==
- The Statue of Saint George in Cluj, a bronze copy cast in Róna's workshop of the Statue of Saint George, Prague Castle
