= Hungarian National Bank =

Central bank of Hungary

Magyar Nemzeti Bank

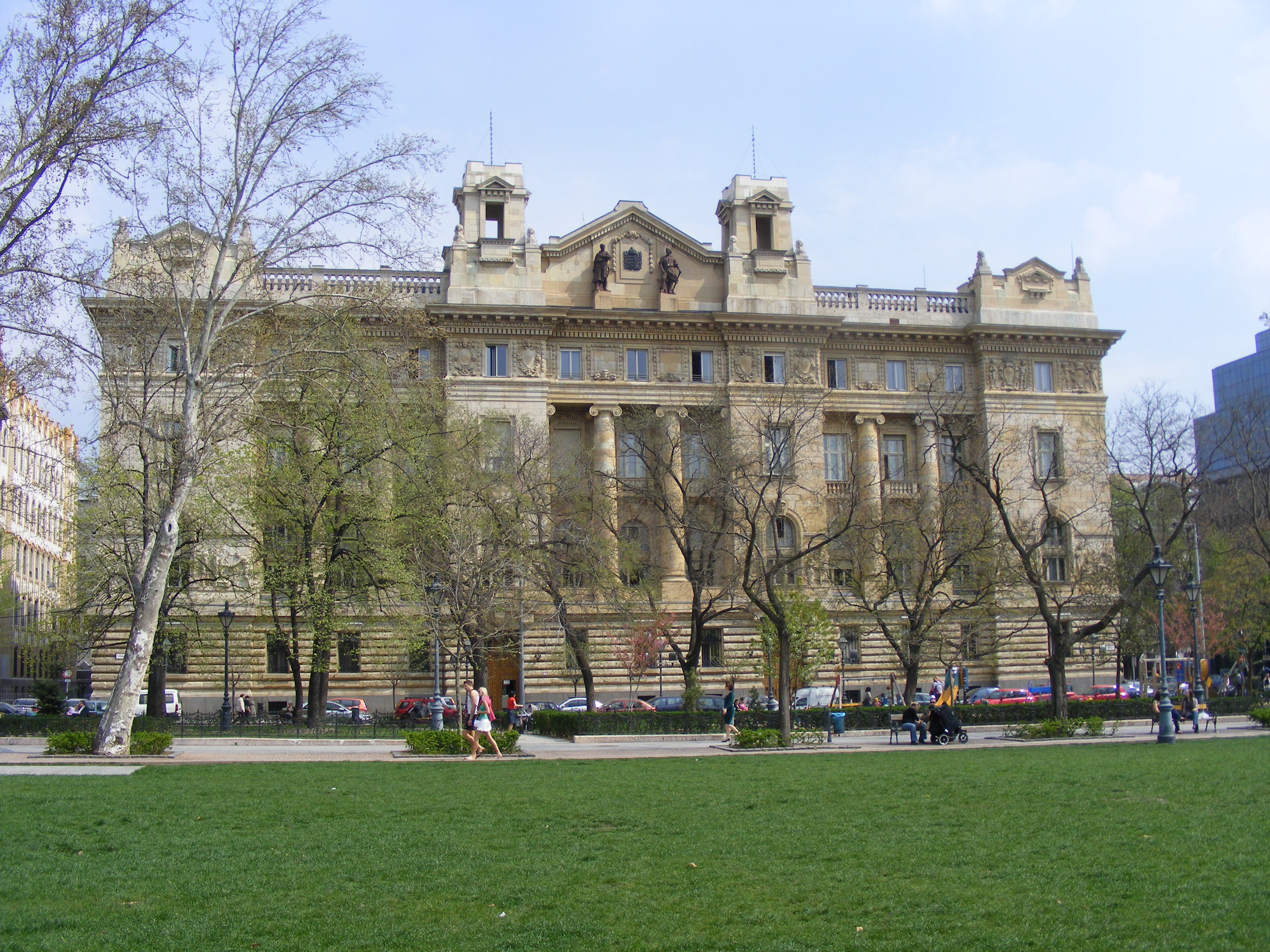
- Hungarian National Bank building on Liberty Square (Budapest)
- Central bank of: Hungary
- Headquarters: Liberty Square, Budapest, Hungary
- Coordinates: 47°30′13″N 19°3′7″E
- Established: 24 June 1924; 102 years ago
- Ownership: 100% state ownership
- Governor: Mihály Varga
- Currency: Hungarian forint HUF (ISO 4217)
- Reserves: $41.3 billion
- Bank rate: 6.50% (September 2024)
- Interest on reserves: 0.90% (May 2016)
- Interest paid on excess reserves?: Yes
- Preceded by: Austro-Hungarian Bank
- Website: www.mnb.hu

The Hungarian National Bank (Hungarian: Magyar Nemzeti Bank [ˈmɒɟɒr ˈnɛmzɛti ˈbɒŋk], MNB) is the central bank of Hungary and as such part of the European System of Central Banks (ESCB). It was established in 1924 as a successor entity of the Austro-Hungarian Bank, under the economic assistance provided to Hungary by the Economic and Financial Organization of the League of Nations. The bank calls itself Magyar Nemzeti Bank in its English communications and occasionally clarifies that name with the expression the central bank of Hungary.

The Hungarian National Bank lays special emphasis on its international relations and on participation in the professional forums of international economic institutions and financial organisations (EU, IMF, OECD, BIS). Its principal aim is price stability, but it is also responsible for issuing the national currency, the Hungarian forint, controlling the money in circulation, setting the Central Bank base rate, publishing official exchange rates, and managing the foreign-exchange reserves and gold to influence exchange rates.

The MNB is the dominant shareholder of the Budapest Stock Exchange and of the KELER Group, a financial market infrastructure.

Under European Union policy frameworks, the MNB is a voting member of the respective Boards of Supervisors of the European Banking Authority (EBA), European Insurance and Occupational Pensions Authority (EIOPA), and European Securities and Markets Authority (ESMA). It provides the permanent single common representative for Hungary in the Supervisory composition of the General Board of the Anti-Money Laundering Authority (AMLA). It is also a member of the European Systemic Risk Board (ESRB).

== History ==
=== Background ===
For a short period during the Hungarian Revolution of 1848, the revolutionary government used the recently established Hungarian Commercial Bank of Pest as a central bank.

In the negotiation of the Austro-Hungarian Compromise of 1867, the matter of the dual monarchy's central bank and its governance was set aside with the understanding that it would be reformed in the future. Meanwhile, in 1873 the Hungarian General Credit Bank received a mandate from the recently created finance ministry for a range of transactions, which made it effectively the main banker of the Hungarian government; that role was reinforced and extend by successive acts in 1886, 1901, and 1915.

The adaptation of the pre-existing Austrian National Bank's to the monarchy's new political structure was only finalized in 1878, when its name was changed to Austro-Hungarian Bank. The latter was given a unitary governance with a general meeting (German: Generalversammlung) and governing council (German: Generalrat) chaired by a Governor, but a dual operating structure with two separate executive teams (German: Direktionen) and head offices (German: Hauptanstalten) in Vienna and Budapest. The governor was to be jointly nominated by the respective ministers of finance of Austria and Hungary, and the bank was statutorily committed to opening new branches on an equitable basis in both parts of the Habsburg Monarchy. Hungarian nationalists were not satisfied by these arrangements and kept advocating for a separate Hungarian central bank, but their efforts remained unsuccessful until the end of the joint monarchy.

The new Budapest head office building of the Austro-Hungarian Bank was inaugurated in 1905. It was designed by architect Ignác Alpár, with sculpture by József Róna and Károly Senyei.

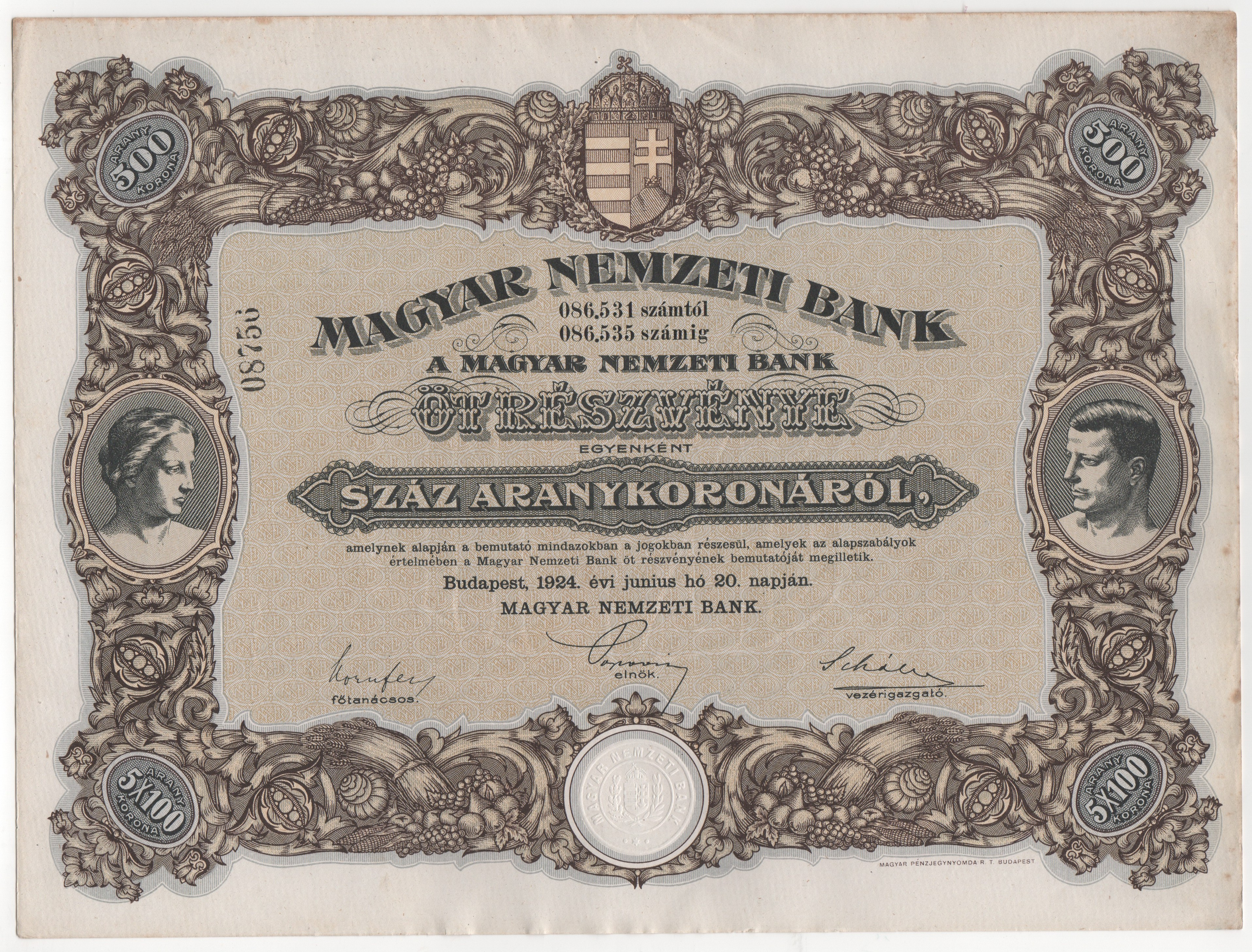
Share of the Hungarian National Bank, issued June 20, 1924

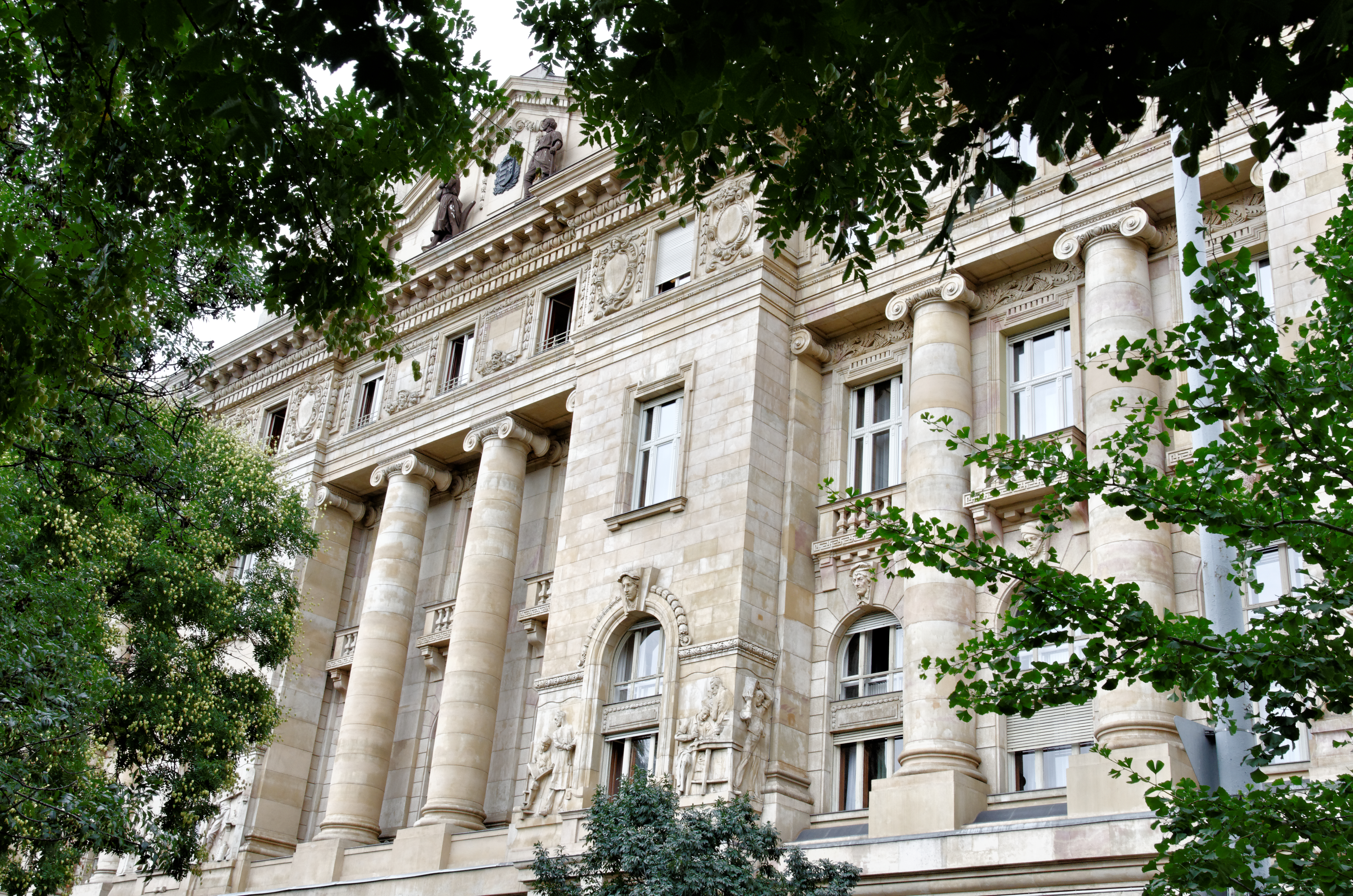

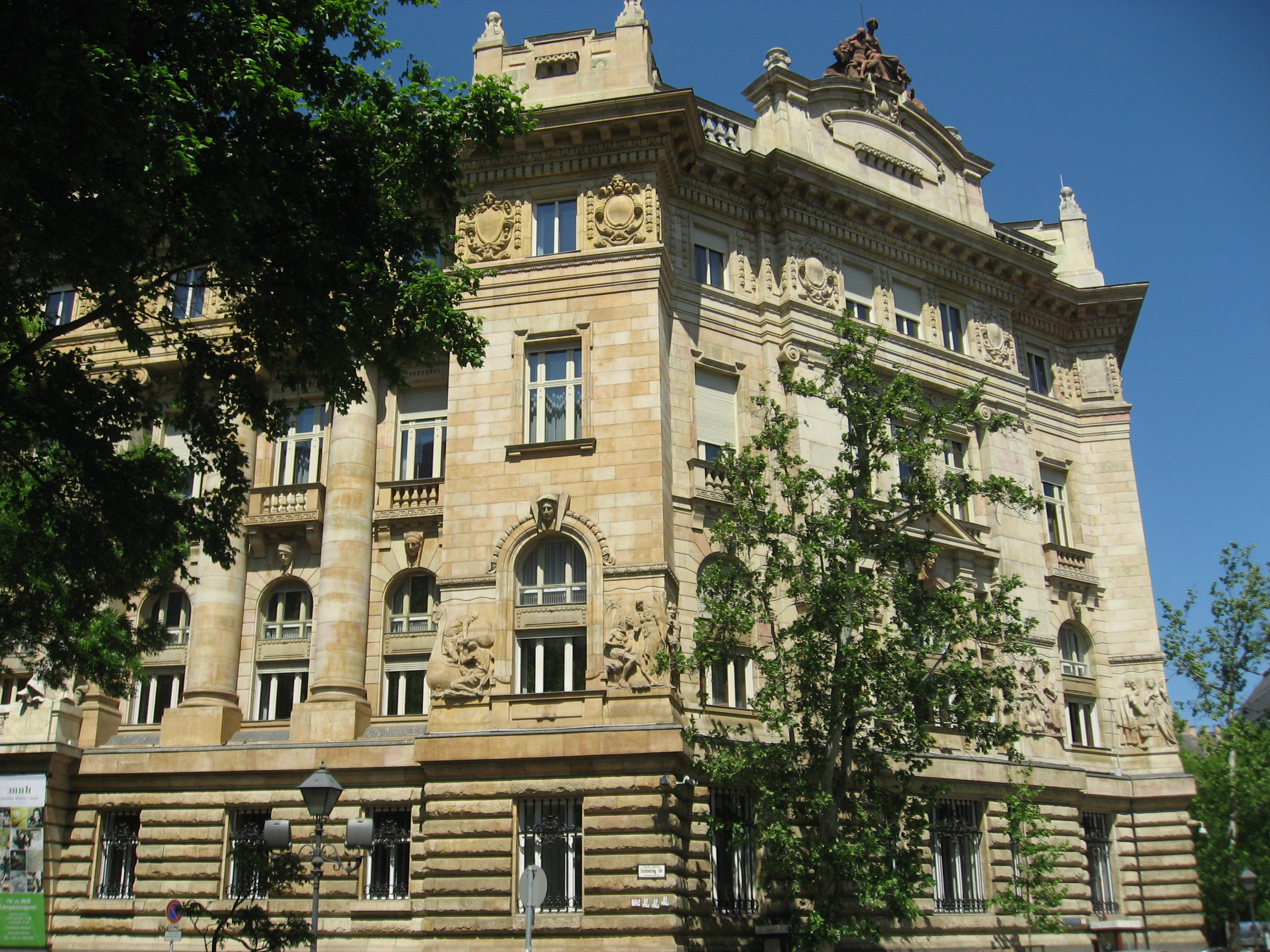

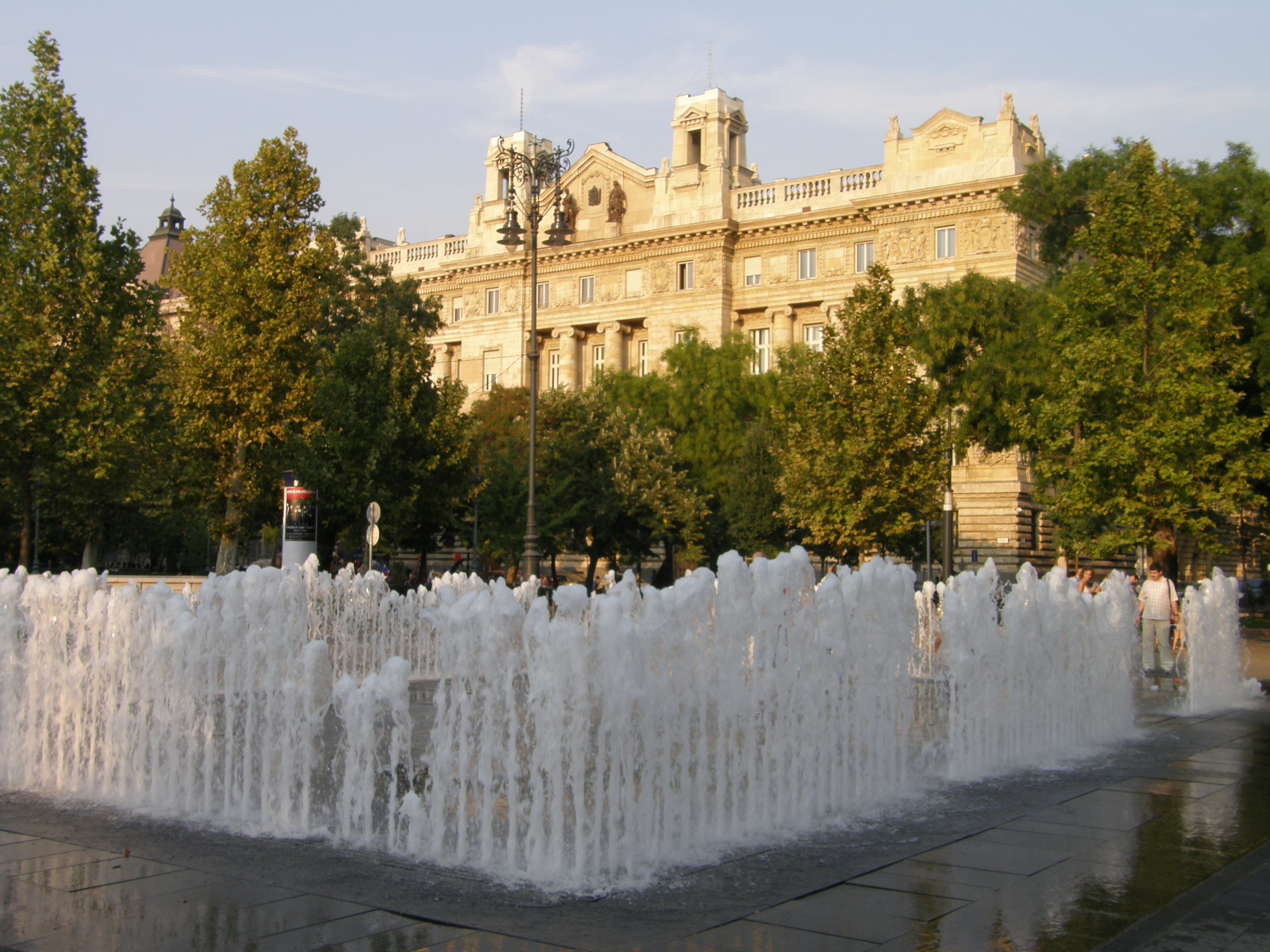

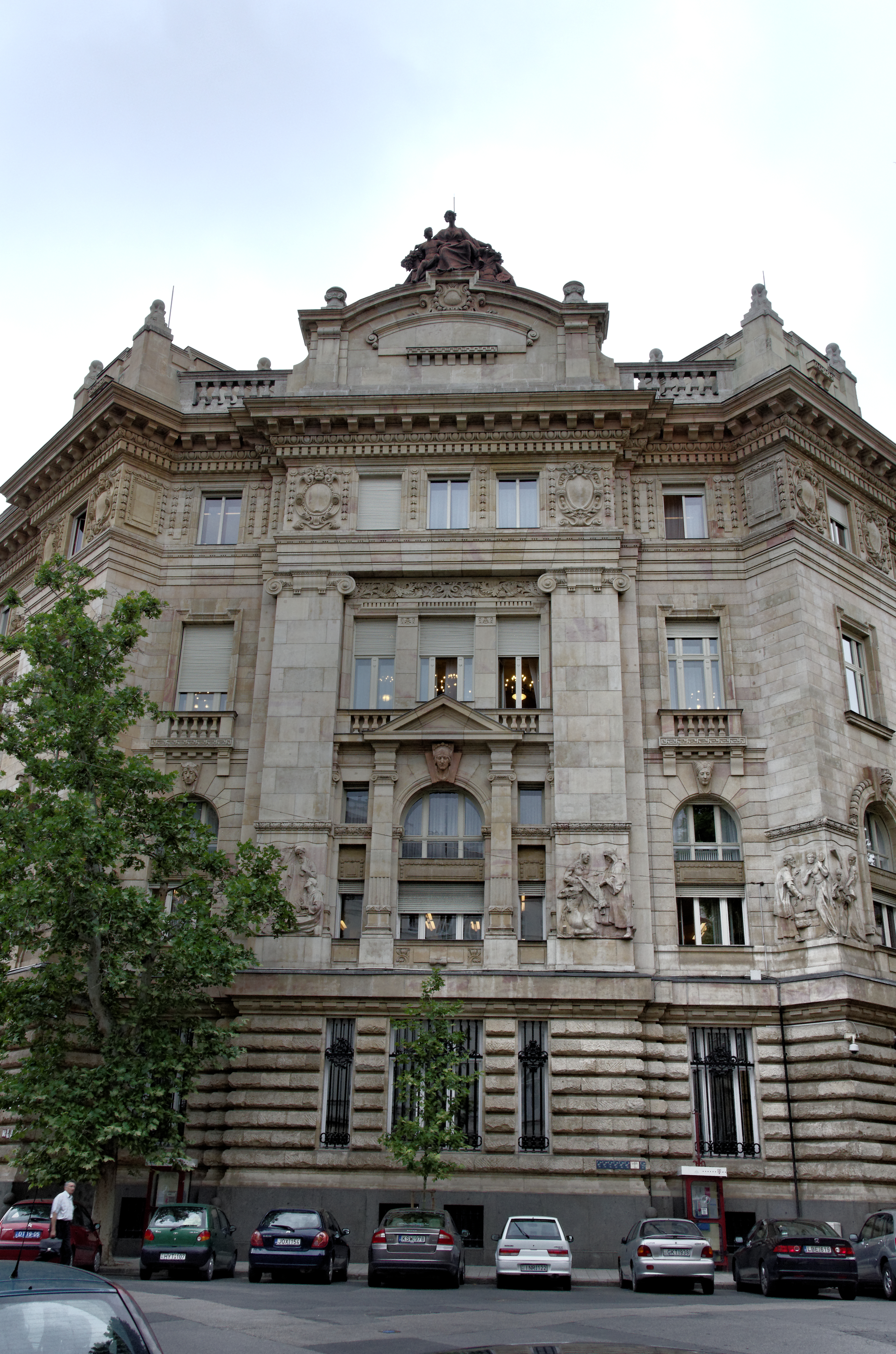

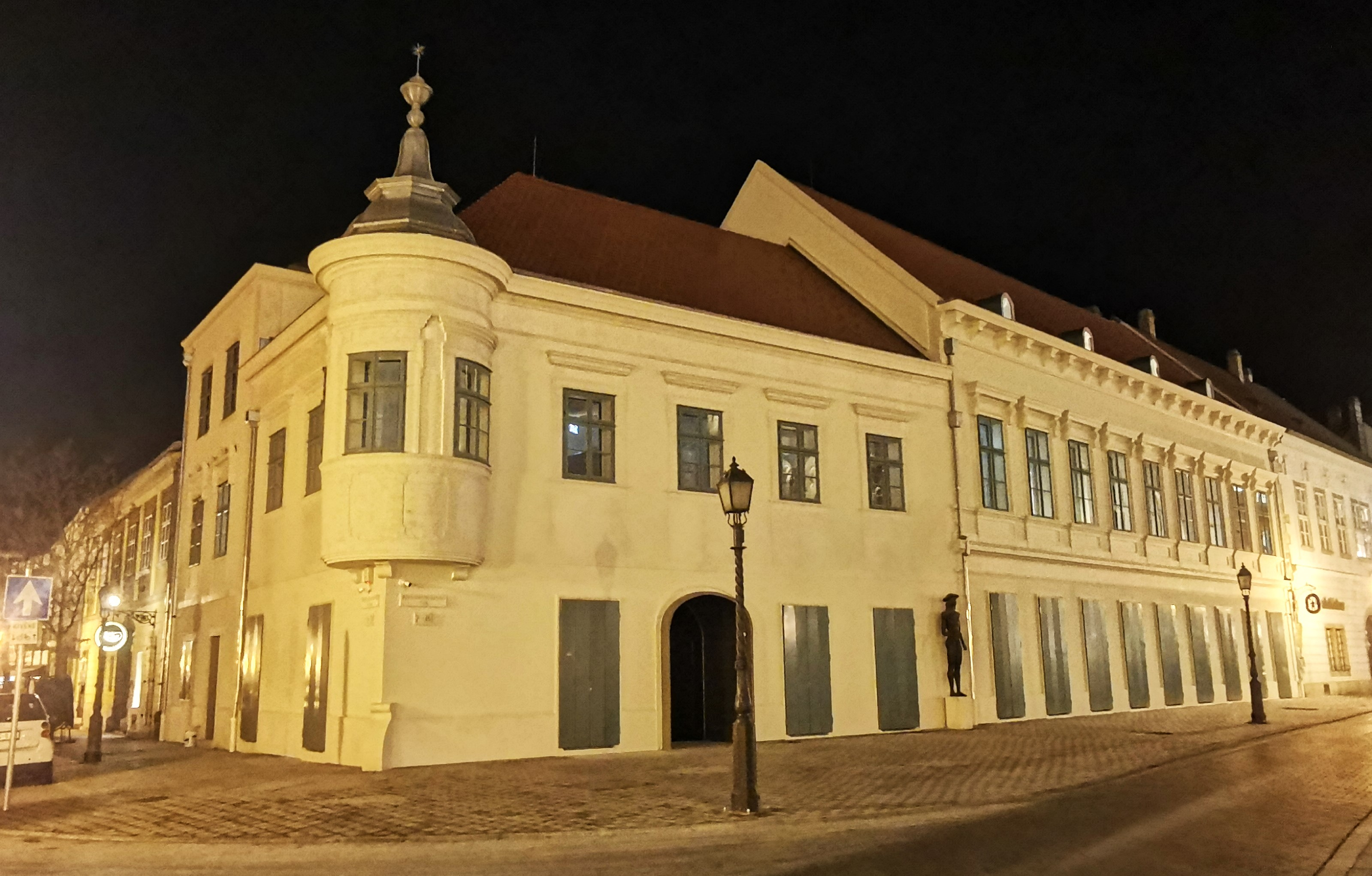
Pallas Athéné Domus Meriti Conference Center

After the chaotic period immediately following World War I, the Hungarian authorities established a Royal Hungarian State Note-Issuing Institute (Hungarian: Magyar Királyi Állami Jegyintézet) on 11 July 1921, which issued Hungarian koronas to replace the Austro-Hungarian krone as the newly independent country's currency. The Institute, however, was under the direct control of the government and found itself unable to control hyperinflation.

=== Interwar period and World War II ===
The Hungarian National Bank was established under the conditions of the stabilization loan coordinated by the Economic and Financial Organization of the League of Nations in 1923–1924, based on the successful precedent of Austria a year earlier. In 1927, the National Bank introduced the Hungarian pengő to replace the korona.

In 1930, the Hungarian National Bank was a founding shareholder of the Bank for International Settlements. During World War II and in its immediate aftermath, the MNB was unable to maintain the value of the pengő which experienced the world's worst-ever recorded bout of hyperinflation in 1945–1946. The MNB introduced a new currency, the Hungarian forint, on 1 August 1946. The MNB was nationalized at the end of 1947.

=== Communist era ===
Following the Communist takeover and formation of the Hungarian People's Republic in 1949, the former operations of Hungarian banks were consolidated into a so-called single-tier banking system with four main financial institutions, namely the Hungarian National Bank, the Hungarian National Savings Bank Company, the Hungarian Investment Bank (renamed the State Bank for Development in 1972 and liquidated in 1987), and the Hungarian Foreign Trade Bank. Under that system, the MNB had no independence from the Hungarian state and also engaged in commercial banking activities. A two-tier banking system that focused the MNB on a monetary policy role was eventually re-introduced on 1 January 1987.

=== Since 1990 ===
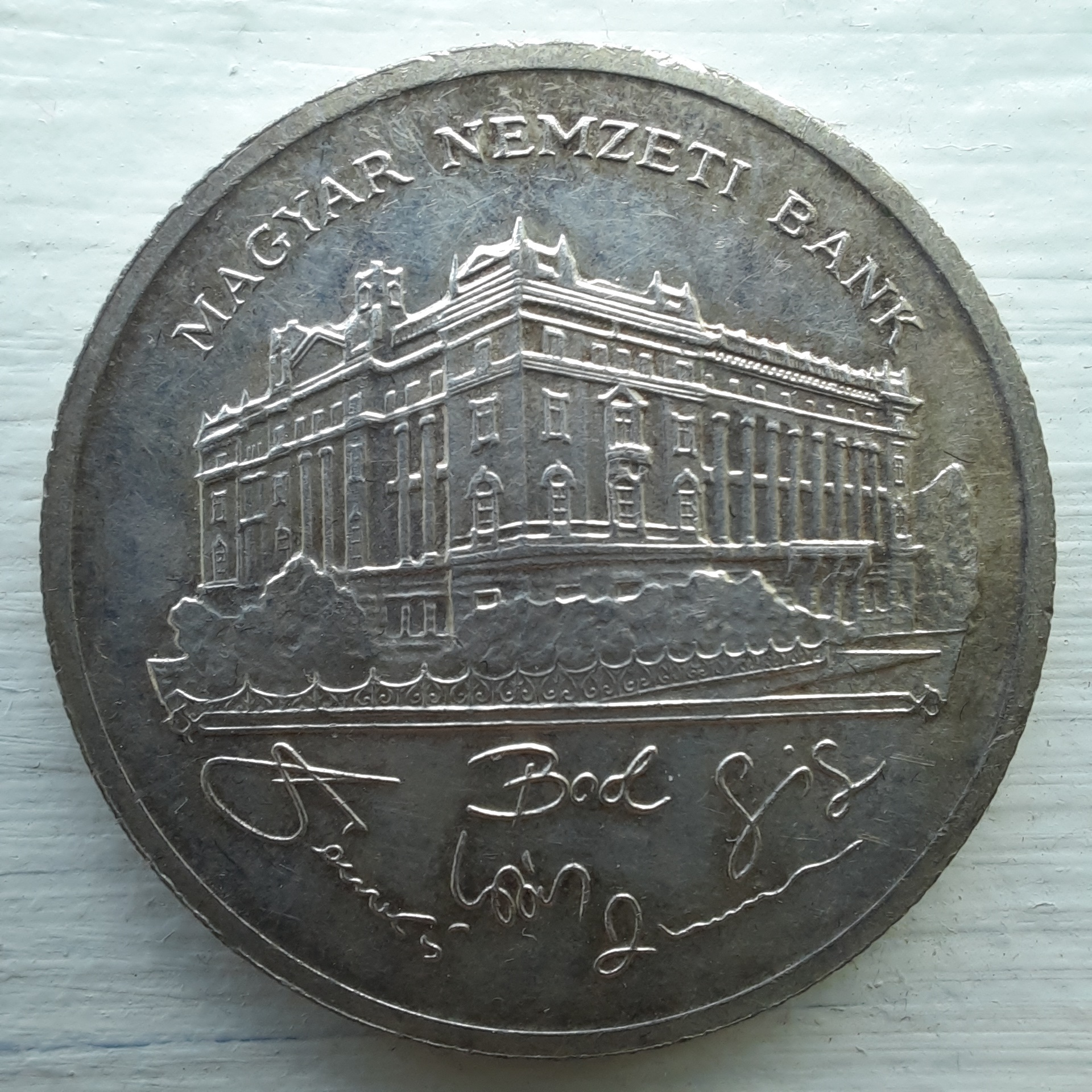
200 Forint coin depicting the bank headquarters, 1992

The October 1991 Act on the National Bank of Hungary reinstated central bank independence. The Act LVIII of 2001 on the Magyar Nemzeti Bank established the Hungarian government and the MNB as the policy makers determining the exchange-rate regime. Since 26 February 2008, the forint has floated freely against the euro.

Hungary was supposed to join the eurozone in 2010, which would have resulted in the MNB losing control of monetary policy, but central bank leaders criticized this plan, saying that the fiscal austerity requirements would slow growth. In December 2011 two of the three major credit rating agencies downgraded Hungarian long term currency debt to "junk status", due in part to changes to the Constitution of Hungary, creating doubts about the independence of the central bank. On 20 May 2016, Fitch Ratings upgraded Hungary's corresponding debt status to BBB− (which is investment grade), assigning a stable outlook to the rating. The upgrade was mainly motivated by, among other factors, high current account surpluses, high European Union (EU) fund inflows, banks' external deleveraging, the central bank's self-financing programme and foreign currency mortgage conversion reducing Hungary's external debt and financial vulnerability.

=== Accusation of money laundering ===
In March 2025, the Hungarian state audit office wrote a report finding that the bank, and its leader, György Matolcsy took part in laundering of 500 billion forints (approximately 1.2 billion euros) worth of money. It has been described in Hungarian media as the biggest bank robbery in world history, as it has surpassed Saddam Hussein 1b$ heist of the national bank of Iraq, which is often mentioned as such.

== Operations ==
The Governor of the Hungarian National Bank is appointed by the President of Hungary at the proposal of the Prime Minister for a six-year term. The most important decision-making body of the Hungarian National Bank is the Monetary Council. Its building is located in Liberty Square, in the Inner City of Budapest, next to the U.S. Embassy building.

The MNB maintains a medium-term inflation target of around 3%. This is somewhat higher than the generally accepted level of inflation for price stability in Europe, and it is used in order to allow for Hungary's "price catch-up" to the rest of Europe. Hungary's Central Bank Act states, "The primary objective of the MNB shall be to achieve and maintain price stability. Without prejudice to its primary objective, the MNB shall support the economic policy of the Government using the monetary policy instruments at its disposal". In 2021, the MNB-mandate changed to include sustainability targets, however, green lending has not picked up in Hungary.

Demonetised or damaged currency can be exchanged in the bank's head office as well as its two regional offices.

== Governors ==
- Sándor Popovics (1924–1935)
- Béla Imrédy (1935–1938)
- Lipót Baranyai (1938–1943)
- Gyula Pósch (1943–1944)
- László Temesváry (1944)
- Imre Oltványi (1945)
- Artúr Kárász (1945)
- Imre Oltványi (1945–1946)
- Ernő Csejkey (1946–1949)
- Ferenc Jeszenszky (1949–1952)
- János Vörös (1952–1955)
- László Háy (1956–1956)
- Dénes Szántó (1956–1960)
- Béla Sulyok (1960–1961)
- Andor László (1961–1975)
- Mátyás Tímár (1975–1988)
- Ferenc Bartha (1988–1990)
- György Surányi (1990–1991)
- Péter Ákos Bod (1991–1994)
- György Surányi (1995–2001)
- Zsigmond Járai (2001–2007)
- András Simor (2007–2013)
- György Matolcsy (2013–2025)
- Mihály Varga (2025–present)

== See also ==
- Economy of Hungary
- Oesterreichische Nationalbank
- National Bank of Czechoslovakia
- National Bank of Yugoslavia
- List of banks in Hungary
- List of central banks
- List of financial supervisory authorities by country
