= Tímár =

Tímár is a Hungarian surname meaning 'tanner'. Notable people with the surname include:

- Mátyás Tímár (1923–2020), Hungarian politician and economist
- Péter Tímár (born 1950), Hungarian film director and screenwriter
