= László Háy =

Hungarian economist, physician and politician

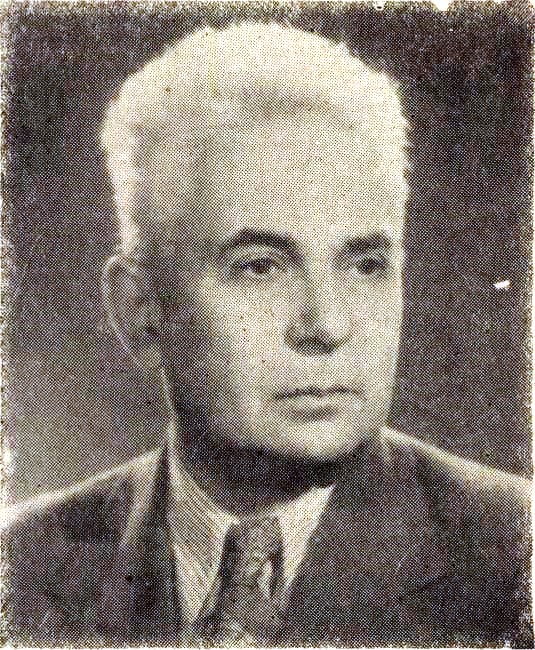
- Born: 31 August 1891; Jászberény, Hungary
- Died: 27 January 1975 (aged 83); Budapest, Hungary

László Háy (31 August 1891 – 27 January 1975) was a Hungarian economist, physician and politician, who served as Governor of the Hungarian National Bank during the Communist regime from 17 April to 20 November 1956. He functioned as Minister of External Trade between 1954 and 1956. He was a member of the Hungarian Academy of Sciences (MTA).

After the fall of the Hungarian Soviet Republic Háy emigrated to Austria then Czechoslovakia. After that he lived in Germany and joined to the Communist Party of Germany. After that he worked in the Soviet Union. He returned to Hungary in 1945.

== Works ==
- Az újratermelési ciklus alakulása a második világháború után (Budapest, 1959)
- A hidegháború gazdasági formái (Budapest, 1964)
- A világkapitalizmus válsága (Budapest, 1966)
- A megváltozott világgazdaság (Budapest, 1970)

== See also ==
- National Bank of Hungary

Political offices
Preceded by János Vörös	Governor of the Hungarian National Bank; 1956	Succeeded by Dénes Szántó
