= Andor László =

Hungarian economist

- Born: 24 December 1914; Budapest, Hungary
- Died: 8 August 1993 (aged 78)
- Education: University of Economics, Vienna

Dr. Andor László (24 December 1914 – 8 August 1993) was a Hungarian economist, who served as Governor of the Hungarian National Bank from 1 November 1961 to 10 July 1975.

== See also ==
- National Bank of Hungary

Political offices
Preceded by Béla Sulyok	Governor of the Hungarian National Bank; 1961–1975	Succeeded by Mátyás Tímár
