= Liberty Square (Budapest) =

Public place in Budapest, Hungary

Coordinates: 47°30′17″N 19°03′01″E

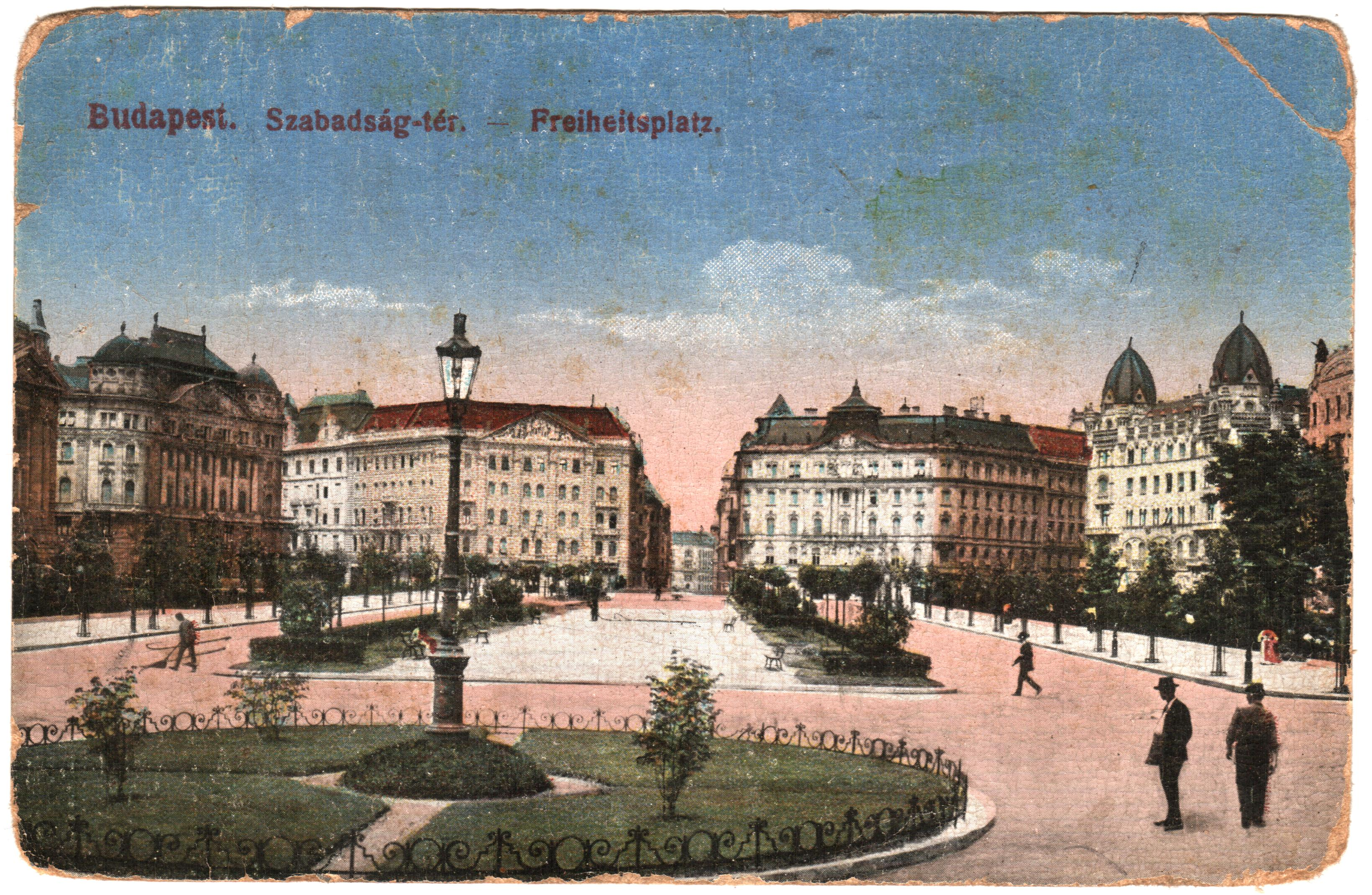
Szabadság tér - Budapest

Liberty Square (Hungarian: Szabadság tér, pronounced [ˈsɒbɒt͡ʃːaːɡ ˈteːr]) is a public square located in the Lipótváros neighborhood of Budapest, Hungary.

The square is a mix of business and residential. The United States Embassy in Hungary and the historicist style headquarters of the Hungarian National Bank abut the east side of the square. Some buildings on the square are designed in the Art Nouveau style. Ignác Alpár designed two of the buildings. The square houses monuments to Ronald Reagan and Harry Hill Bandholtz and a monument to the end of German occupation of Hungary in World War II. In 2020, together with the United States Embassy, it built a large statue of US President George Bush. Some of the monuments like the WWII liberation sculpture were designed by Károly Antal. The Memorial for Victims of the German Occupation portrays Hungary as an angel being attacked by Germany in the form of an eagle—symbolism that obscures Hungary's willing participation in the Holocaust. A counter-monument that includes photos of Hungarians who were sent to Auschwitz was created in 2014 in front of the memorial.

== History ==
A barrack-prison ("Újépület") that previously occupied the space, was the site where Prime Minister Lajos Batthyány was executed in 1849, following the Hungarian Revolution. The building was destroyed in 1897 and the square constructed on the site.

== Gallery ==
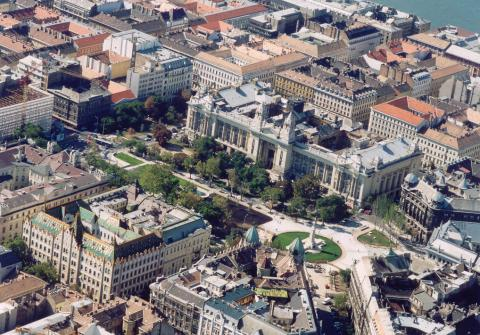
The former Budapest Stock Exchange looking southeast

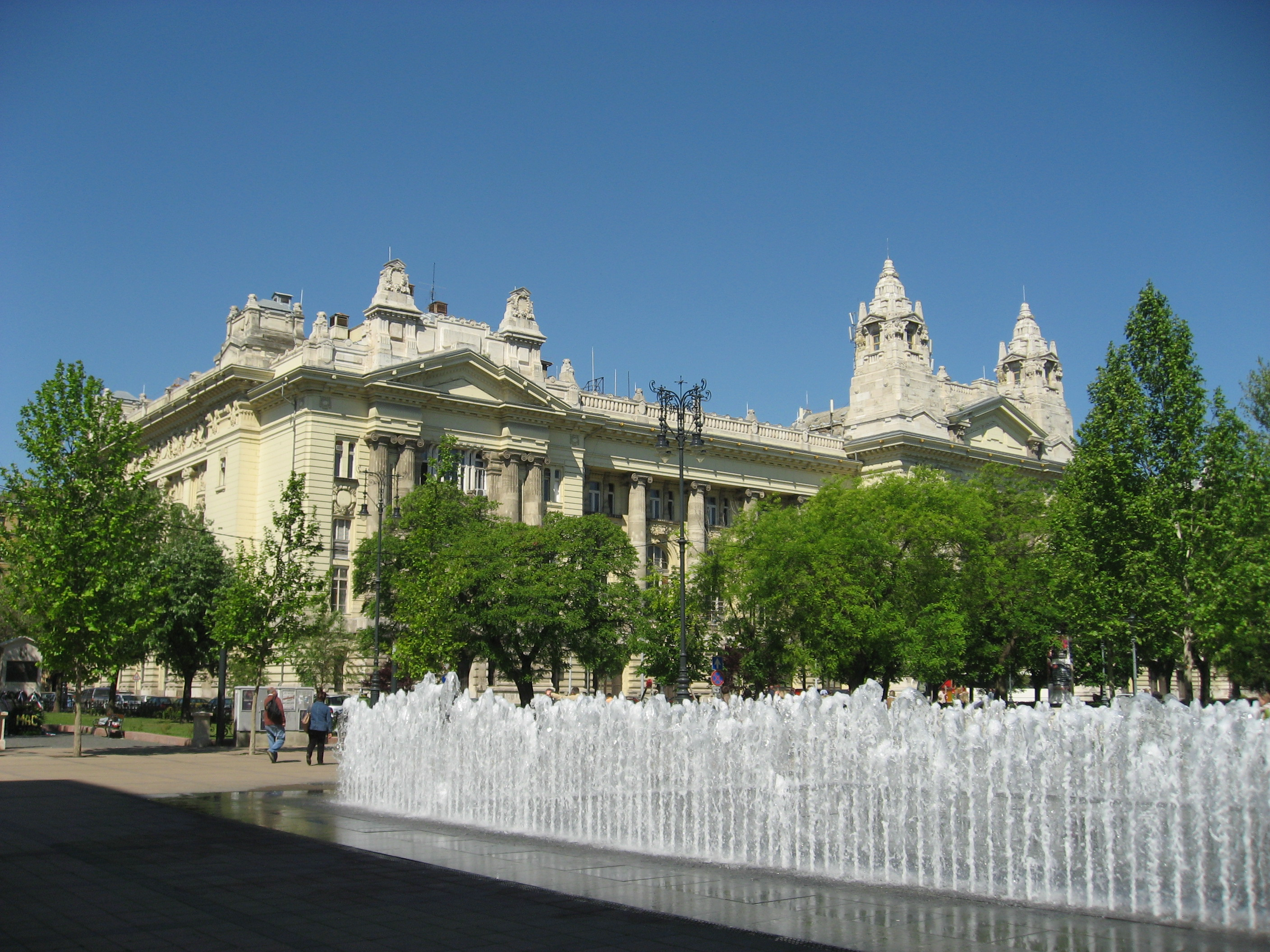
The former home of the Budapest Stock exchange

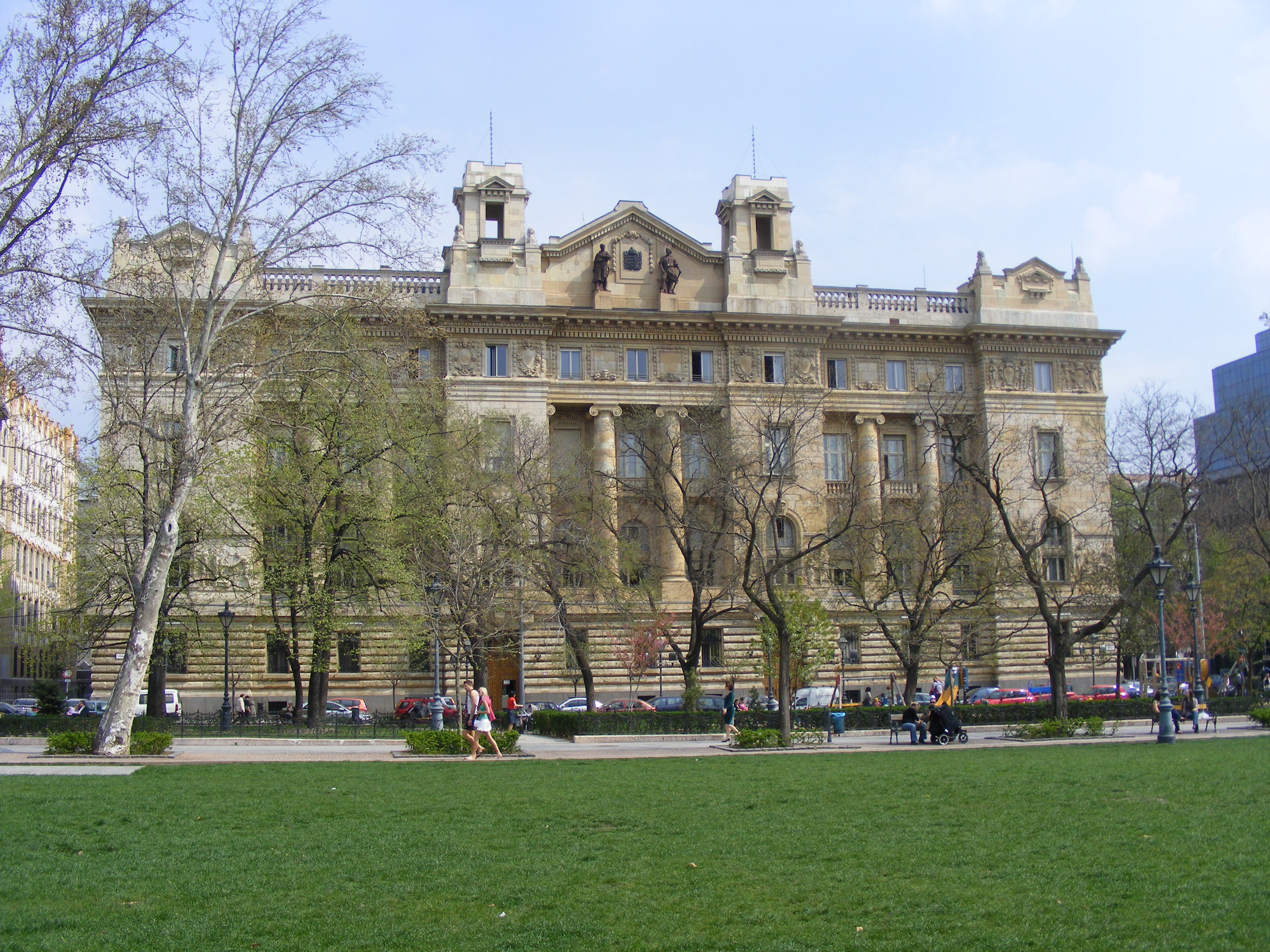
Hungarian National Bank

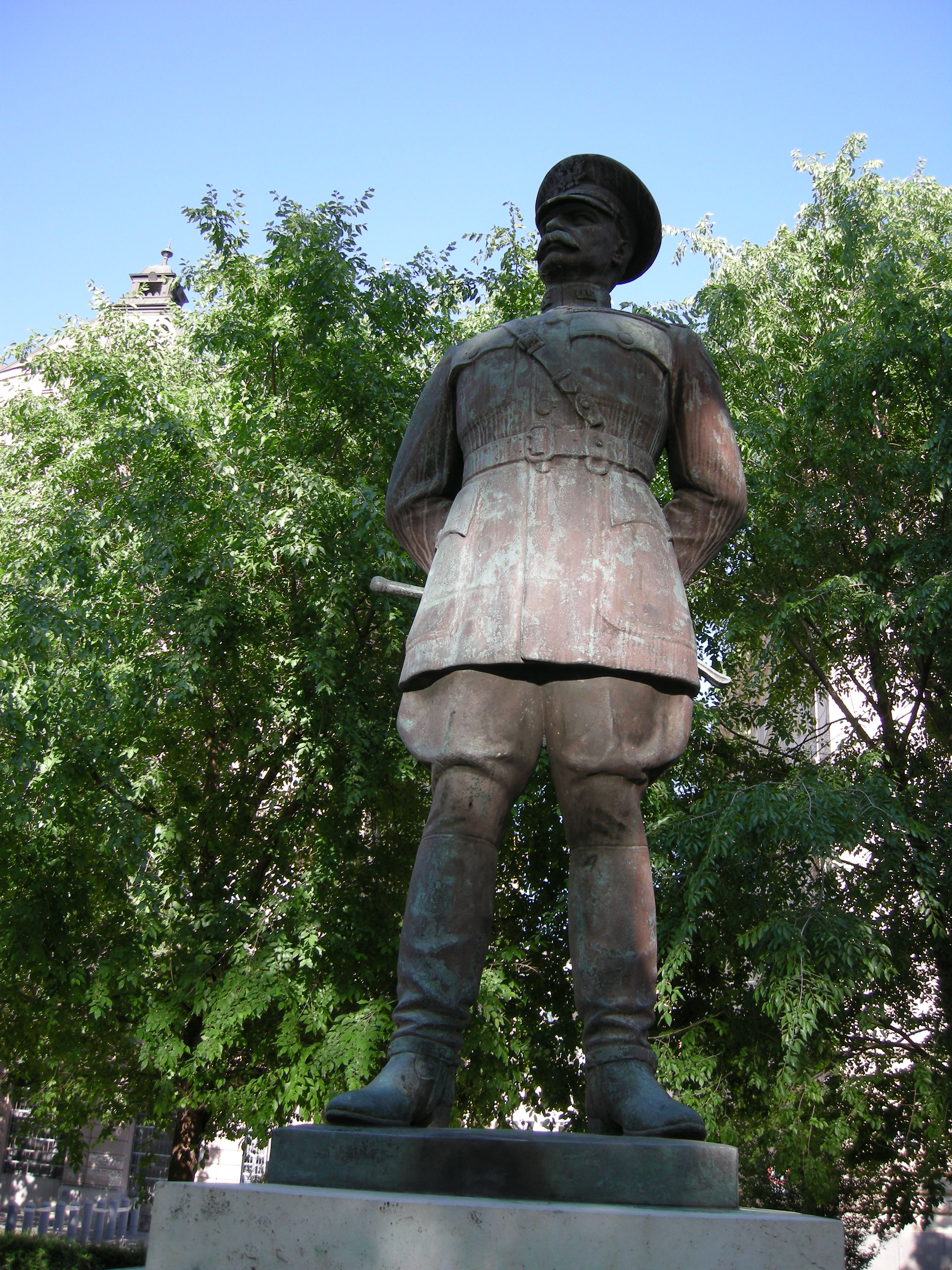
Monument to US General Harry Hill Bandholtz

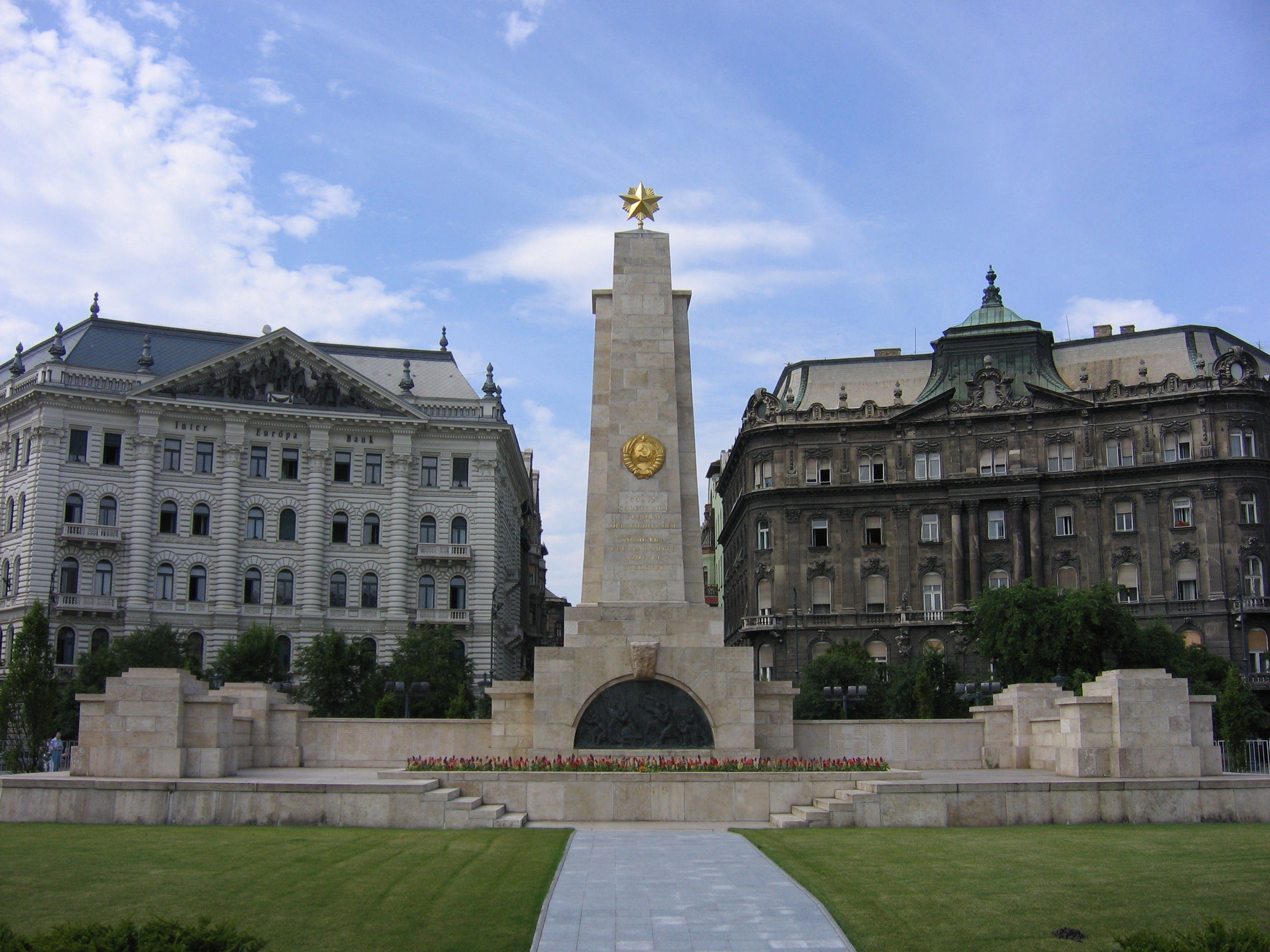
Monument to the Soviet Red Army (1946)

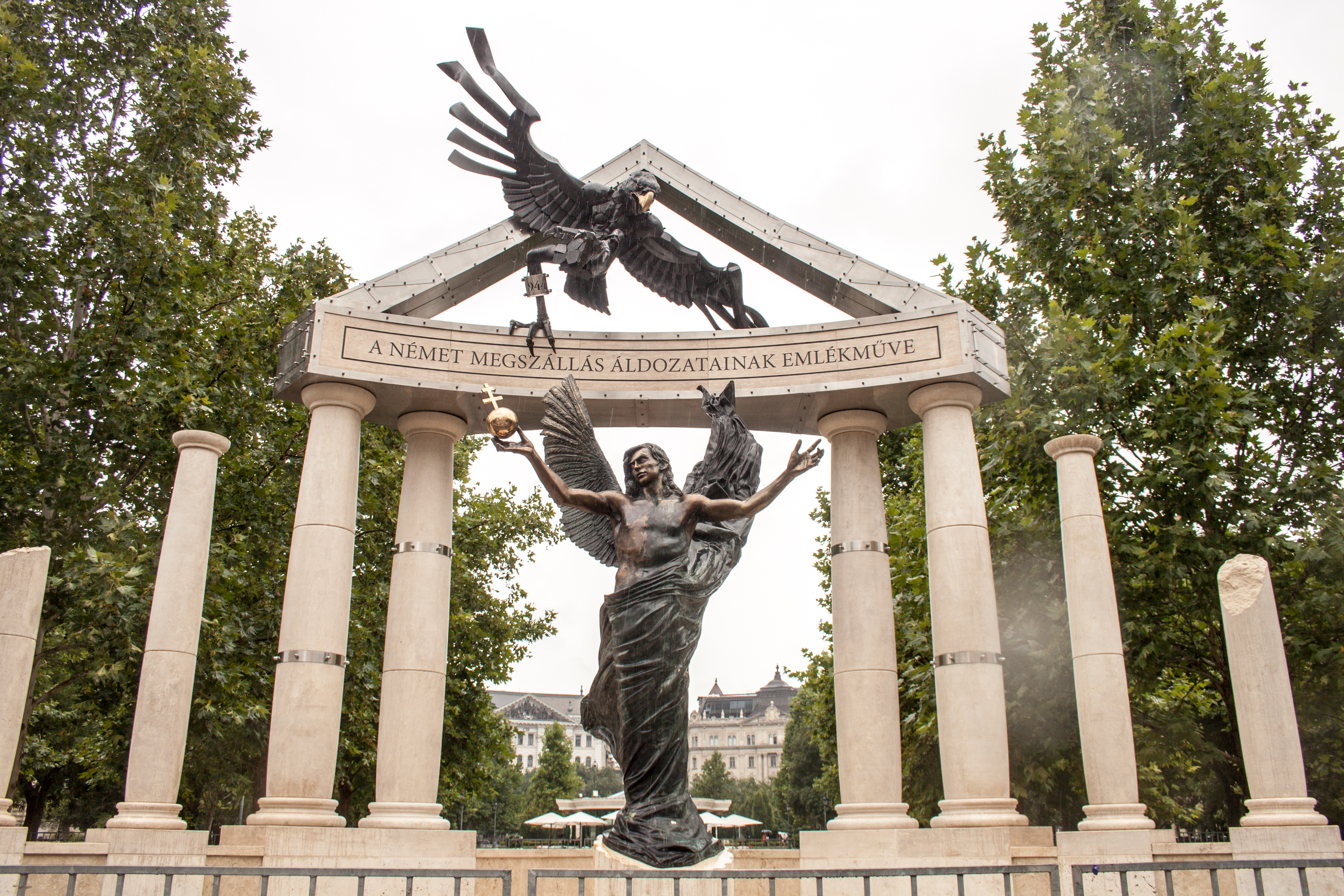
Memorial for Victims of the German Occupation (2014)

== See also ==
- Liberty Square, Łódź, Poland
