= Dénes Szántó =

Hungarian economist

- Occupation: Governor of the Hungarian National Bank

Dénes Szántó was a Hungarian economist, who served as Governor of the Hungarian National Bank after the Hungarian Revolution of 1956, from 20 November 1956 to 30 June 1960.

== See also ==
- National Bank of Hungary

Political offices
Preceded by László Háy	Governor of the Hungarian National Bank; 1956–1960	Succeeded by Béla Sulyok
