= György Surányi =

Hungarian economist

- Born: January 3, 1954 (age 72); Budapest, Hungary
- Education: Corvinus University of Budapest
- Occupations: Chairman, President & CEO at CIB Bank; regional head of Intesa Sanpaolo banking group
- Spouse: Dr Judit Marmoly
- Children: Szilvia; Gábor

György Surányi (born January 3, 1954) is a Hungarian economist the CEO and chairman of CIB Bank and former president of the Hungarian National Bank.

== Career ==
Surányi has been president of the Hungarian national Bank between 1990–1991 and again in 1995-2001. In his second tenure as central banker from 1995 he played a role in the restoration of balance to the Hungarian economy and getting inflation under control. In the same period he co-authored the Bokros package, a series of measures cutting both the budget and current account deficits. Surányi is also the regional head of Intesa Sanpaolo a banking group of Italy. Under Surányi, the Hungarian Forint (HUF), became fully convertible for the first time. In March 2009 his name was mentioned as a possible replacement for outgoing Prime Minister Ferenc Gyurcsány. Hungarian political party SZDSZ announced that Surányi was acceptable to them as a candidate for Prime Minister. Party leader Gábor Fodor said, Surányi is the one who could restore trust, and govern the country free of party influences. Surányi was asked about his possible nomination and said that a new government will need clear support from all parliamentary parties "even if to a different degree".

President of Hungary László Sólyom stated that instead of a short term transitional government ruling only until the 2010 elections, early elections should be held. Surányi himself remained noncommittal declining to say whether he would accept the position of PM if nominated. Hungarian political party Fidesz has said it will not support any new government including one led by Surányi. This not a personal problem, they support only a new, early parliamentary election. Surányi became the frontrunner candidate for the post of prime minister; however, on 26 March he pulled out of the race, saying he would not take the job.

The World Economic Forum titled him to Global Leader of Tomorrow, in 1993. In 1996, Euromoney named Surányi the central banker of the year in Central and Eastern Europe. Surányi reached the academic rank of full professor in 1998. He lectured at the Central European University.

== Personal life ==
He is married. His wife is Dr Judit Marmoly. They have a daughter, Szilvia, and a son, Gábor.

== See also ==
- Alexandre Lamfalussy
- National Bank of Hungary

Political offices
Preceded by Ferenc Bartha	Governor of the Hungarian National Bank; 1990–1991	Succeeded by Péter Ákos Bod
Preceded by Péter Ákos Bod	Governor of the Hungarian National Bank; 1995–2001	Succeeded by Zsigmond Járai
