= Tamás Beck =

Hungarian politician

Minister of Trade
- In office 5 October 1988 – 23 May 1990
- Preceded by: József Marjai
- Succeeded by: Péter Ákos Bod (Industry and Trade)

Personal details
- Born: 26 February 1929 Budapest, Hungary
- Died: 20 August 2014 (aged 85) Budapest, Hungary
- Party: MSZMP (1976–1989)
- Profession: engineer, politician

Tamás Beck (26 February 1929 – 20 August 2014) was a Hungarian politician who served as Minister of Trade between 1988 and 1990.

== Biography ==
Beck joined 1976 the Hungarian Socialist Workers' Party (Magyar Szocialista Munkáspárt – MSZMP). 1985 he was promoted to be a member of the committee for economic policy of his party and on 23 June 1987 he was elected to be a member of the Central Committee of the MSZMP.

On 5 October 1988 Beck became Minister of Trade in the cabinet of Prime Minister Miklós Németh until 23 May 1990.
