= Péter Ákos Bod =

Hungarian politician and economist

Péter Ákos Bod MP
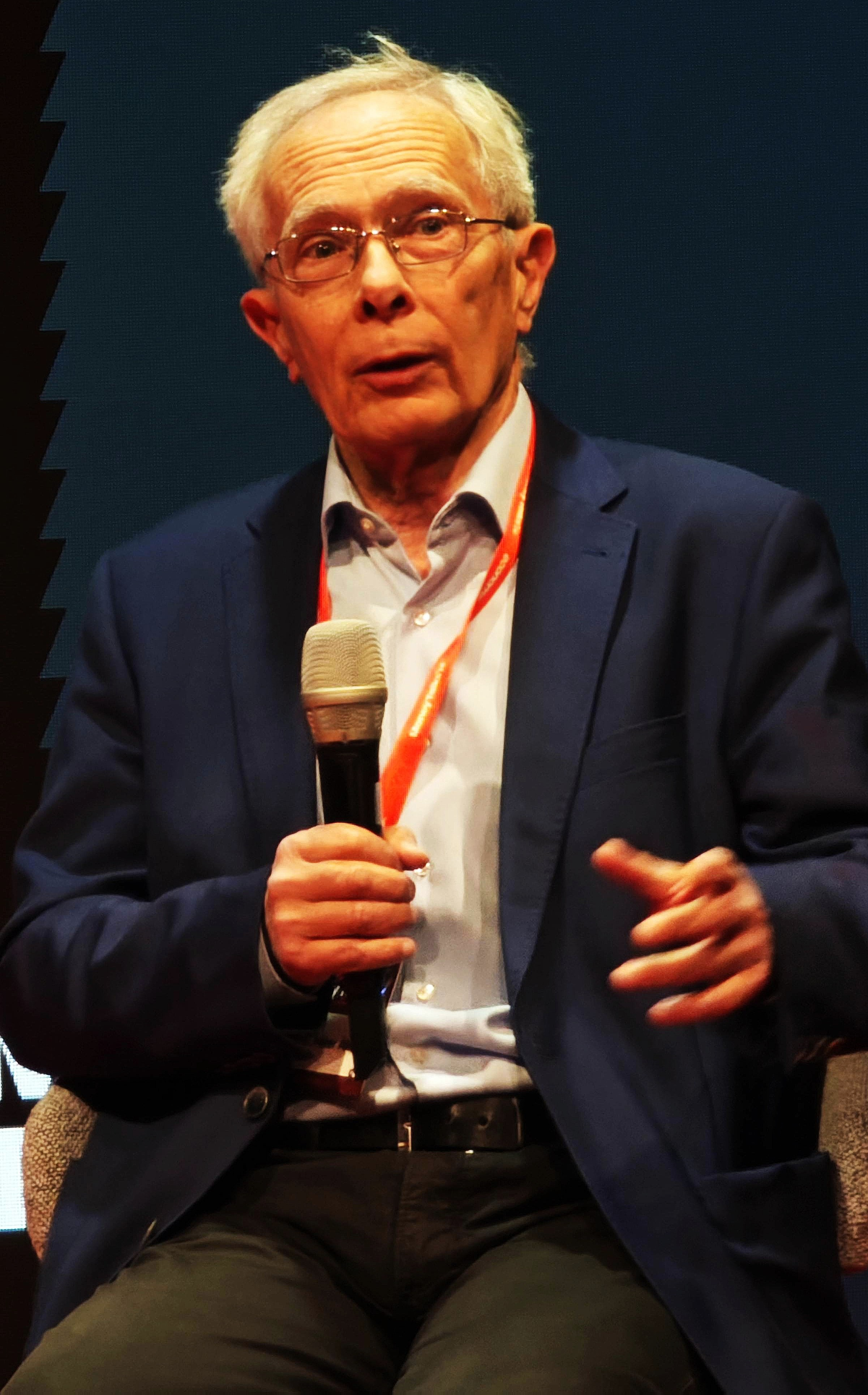
- Péter Ákos Bod in 2026

Governor of the Hungarian National Bank
- In office 9 December 1991 – 14 December 1994
- Preceded by: György Surányi
- Succeeded by: György Surányi

Minister of Industry and Trade
- In office 23 May 1990 – 9 December 1991
- Prime Minister: József Antall
- Preceded by: Ferenc Horváth (Industry); Tamás Beck (Trade)
- Succeeded by: Iván Szabó

Member of the National Assembly
- In office 2 May 1990 – 9 December 1991

Personal details
- Born: 28 July 1951 (age 74) Szigetvár, Hungary
- Party: MDF (1989–1996); MDNP (1996–2001)
- Spouse: Katalin Monostori (m. 1974; div. 2006) Léda Szőnyi (m. 2008)
- Children: Zsófia; Péter; Márton
- Profession: politician, economist

Péter Ákos Bod (born 28 July 1951) is a Hungarian politician and economist, who served as Minister of Industry and Trade in the cabinet of József Antall from 1990 to 1991 then Governor of the Hungarian National Bank from 1991 to 1994, when he resigned under the pressure of the Socialist Gyula Horn cabinet. He was also a Member of Parliament for the Hungarian Democratic Forum (MDF) from 1990 until his resignation in 1991. In 1996, he joined the Hungarian Democratic People's Party (MDNP) and was elected to its leadership.

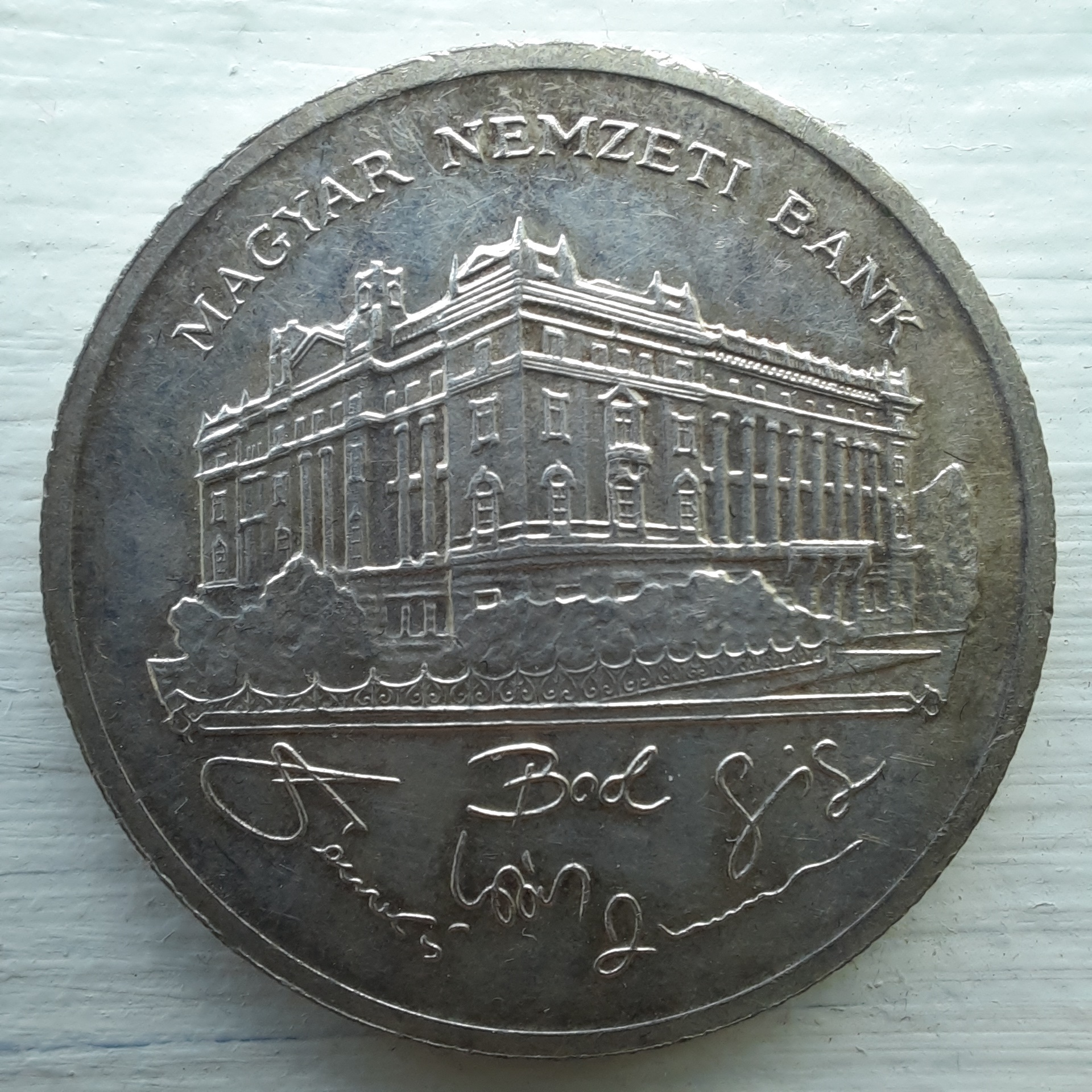
A 200 Forint coin bearing Bod's signature

Before the second round of the 2006 parliamentary election, when MDF made it clear that they would not support Viktor Orbán's Fidesz, Orbán tried to get their support by declaring that he withdrew from Prime Minister candidacy, and sought a compromise candidate, Péter Ákos Bod. However MDF maintains its position and Fidesz lost the election by the ruling left-wing coalition parties.

His ancestor was Péter Bod (1712–1769), a Transylvanian Calvinist pastor, historian, "the greatest Hungarian scientist in the late-Baroque decades."

== Personal life ==
He married Katalin Monostori in 1974. Their daughter, Zsófia was born in 1977. They divorced in 2006. He remarried in 2008 to Léda Szőnyi with whom he has two sons, Péter (born in 2009) and Márton (born in 2011).

Political offices
Preceded by Tamás Beck	Minister of Industry and Trade; 1990–1991	Succeeded by Iván Szabó
Preceded by György Surányi	Governor of the Hungarian National Bank; 1991–1994	Succeeded by György Surányi
