= Memorial for Victims of the German Occupation =

Monument in Budapest, Hungary

Coordinates: 47°30′17″N 19°01′01″E

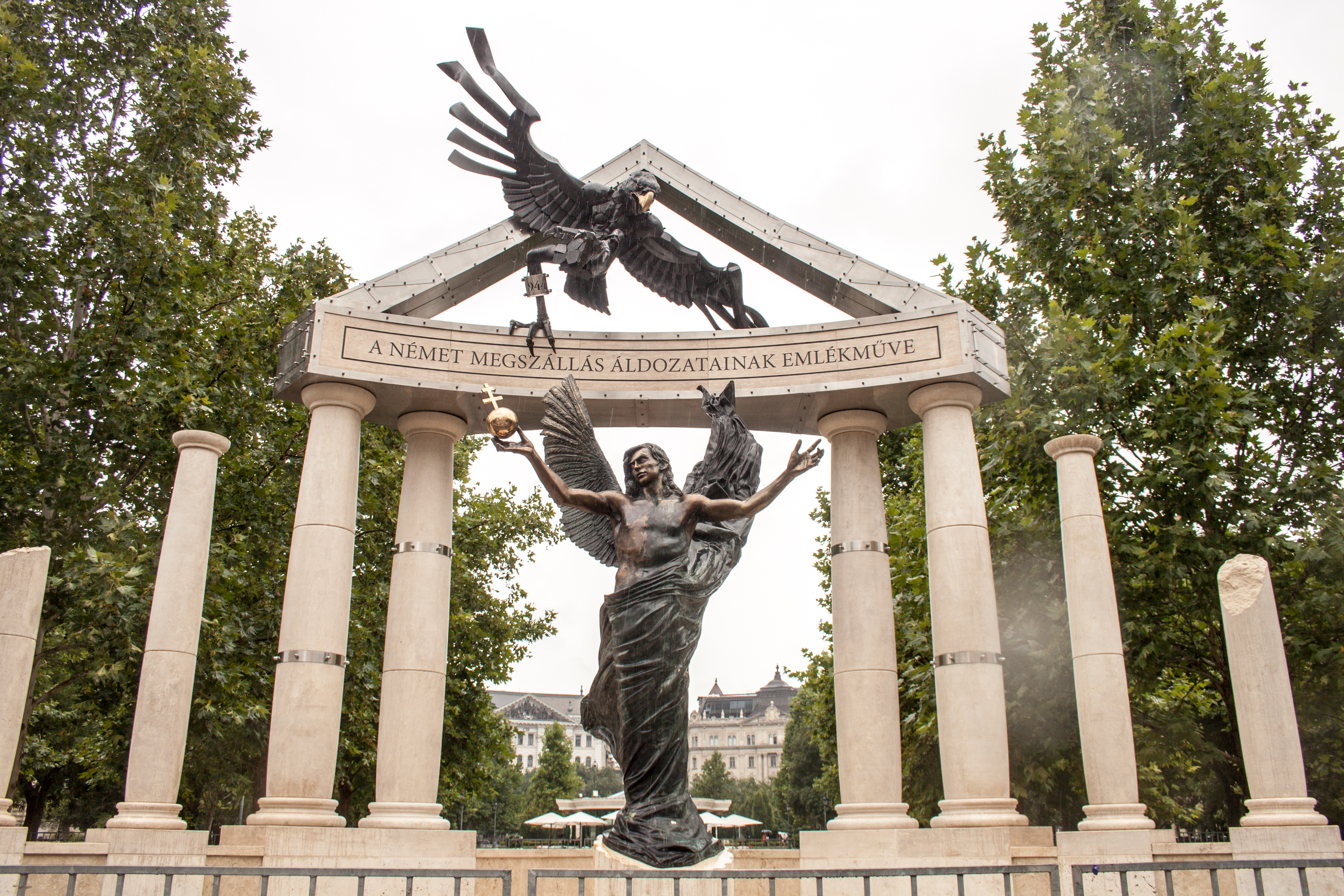
The memorial

The Memorial for Victims of the German Occupation (Hungarian: A német megszállás áldozatainak emlékműve) is a monument created in memory of the German invasion of Hungary, located in Budapest's Liberty Square. The memorial has sparked controversy and angered Jewish community organizations, with critics alleging that the monument absolves the Hungarian state and Hungarians of their collaboration with Nazi Germany and complicity in the Holocaust. Accordingly, many individuals and organizations leave improvised individual tributes to Holocaust victims along the edge of the site.

== Dedication ==
First announced in late 2013 and approved in a closed cabinet session on New Year's Eve of 2013, the memorial was built on the night of July 20/21, 2014.

== Description ==
The memorial features a stone statue of the Archangel Gabriel, holding the globus cruciger of the Hungarian kings, the national symbol of Hungary and Hungarian sovereignty, and this later is about to be grabbed by an eagle with extended claws that resembles the German coat of arms, the eagle representing the Nazi invasion and occupation of Hungary in March, 1944. The date "1944" in on the eagle's ankle. The inscription at the base of the monument reads "In memory of the victims." The statue is the interpretation of the Millenium Monument of the Heroes Square in Budapest.

== Criticism ==
The Holocaust Educational Trust has described the memorial as an example of Holocaust distortion, stating that the memorial "fails to recognise that almost all Hungarian citizens murdered during the Holocaust were Jews" and that the memorial deflects responsibility for the Holocaust by suggesting that "all Hungarians were innocent victims of the Nazi Occupation" without acknowledging that "Hungarian citizens were complicit in the process of rounding up Jews and putting them into ghettos and onto trains to be transported to camps."

== Gallery ==
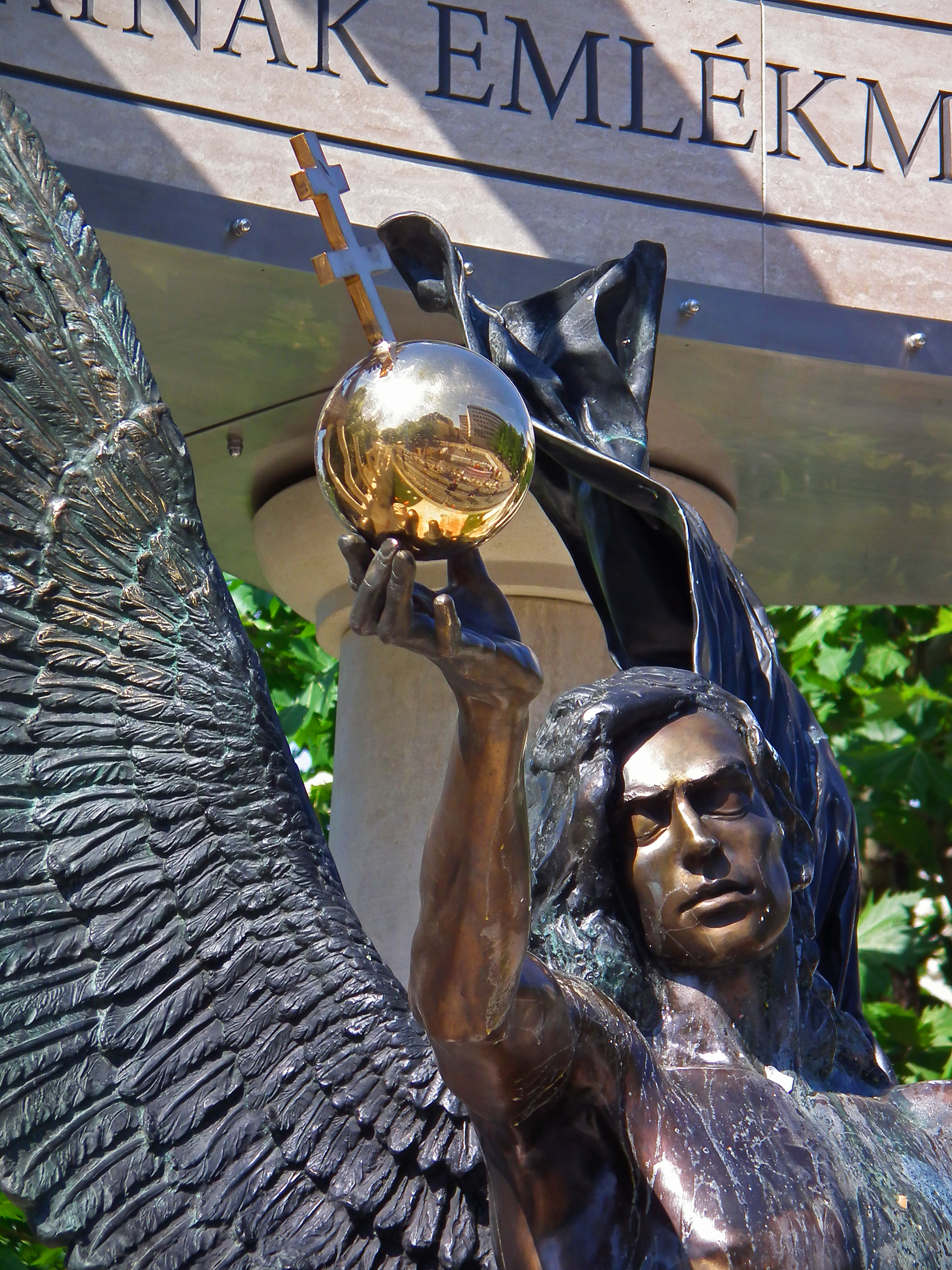

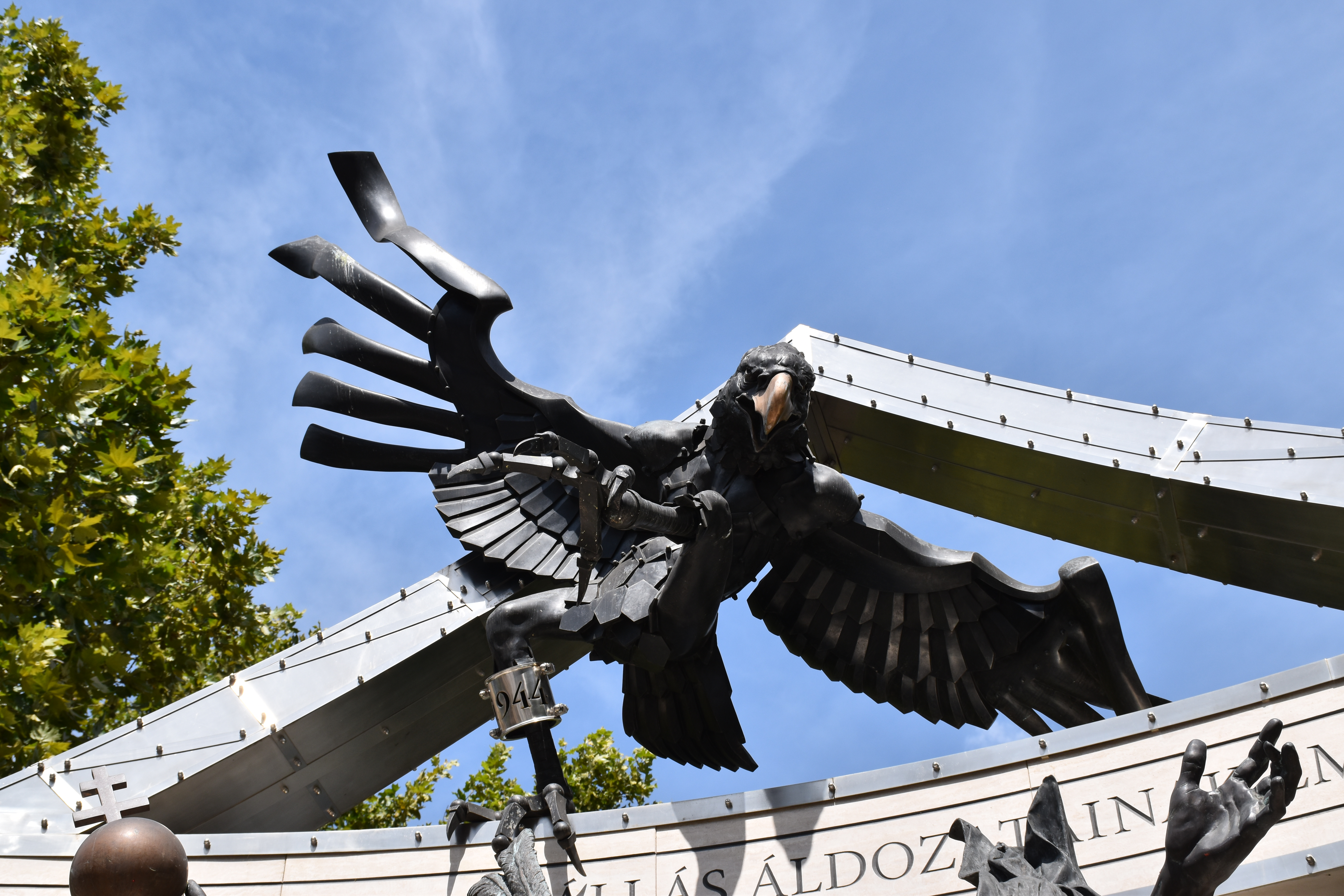
