= Béla Sulyok =

- Born: 21 November 1904; Budapest, Hungary
- Died: 1 March 1977 (aged 72); Budapest, Hungary

Béla Sulyok (21 November 1904 – 1 March 1977) was a Hungarian economist. He served as Governor of the Hungarian National Bank during the Communist regime from 1 July 1960 to 31 October 1961.

Sulyok became an official at the Hungarian General Savings Bank in 1923. He fought in the Second World War. He joined the Soviet Red Army in 1944 and participated in "liberation" of Hungary. He later entered politics and took part in the foundation of Szikra Press, which became the most powerful propaganda tool of the Communist rule. He served as deputy head of the Economics Department of the Hungarian Communist Party (MKP) for a short time beginning in April 1945.

Sulyok was one of the main perpetrators of the nationalization of banks in 1948. He functioned as Secretary of State for Finance until 1951. After 1961 he was appointed Deputy Minister of Finance. He had retired in 1968.

== See also ==
- National Bank of Hungary

Political offices
Preceded by Dénes Szántó	Governor of the Hungarian National Bank; 1960–1961	Succeeded by Andor László
