= Ferenc Bartha =

Hungarian economist

- Born: 6 August 1943; Budapest, Hungary
- Died: 7 May 2012 (aged 68); Tihany, Hungary
- Education: University of Economics (today: Corvinus University of Budapest)
- Occupations: Chairman, President & CEO at TriGranit Development Inc.;

Ferenc Bartha (6 August 1943 – 7 May 2012) was a Hungarian economist who was the last governor of the Hungarian National Bank during the Communist regime.

== Career ==
He was born in Budapest on 6 August 1943. He studied external trade at the University of Economics (today: Corvinus University) until 1965. He became a member of the Institute of Economics at the Hungarian Academy of Sciences (MTA). He was a Deputy Head of Department at the Ministry of Foreign Trade from 1970 to 1980.

He headed Secretariat for International Economic Relations of the Council of Ministers between 1980 and 1987. He was appointed Secretary of State of the Ministry of Trade in 1987. He functioned as Governor of the National Bank from 1988 to 1990. After that he became Chief Executive of the Indosuez Financial Services Ltd., based in Vienna. Then he worked as the President of the Banque Indosuez Hungary.

Bartha was appointed Chairman of the Board of the National Property Agency (ÁVÜ) and also became Government Commissioner for the Privatization. He founded and led Bartha Financial Advisor Ltd. since 1995. He also was Chief Executive Officer (CEO) of the Gránit Pólus Investment and Development Inc. from 1996 to 1998.

He was the CEO of the TriGránit Development Inc. between 1997 and 1999, after that became President of that company until 2003. Since that he was President of the TriGránit Holding Inc. and he was the Chairman of the Board of the Gránit Bank Co. Ltd. He was the Chairman of the Audit Committee of the National Association of Contractors and Employers. He was a member of the Hungarian Economical Society, South Eastern Europe Business Advisory Council, Science Council of the MTA's World Economic Research Institute. He received Chevalier of the French Legion of Honor.

== Death ==
Ferenc Bartha died on 7 May 2012, at the age of 68. According to the Veszprém County Police Department, he committed suicide in his cottage in Tihany. Police spokesperson Viktória Komár said "she [did] not know that Bartha would have left behind a suicide note."

== See also ==
- National Bank of Hungary

Political offices
Preceded by Mátyás Tímár	Governor of the Hungarian National Bank; 1988–1990	Succeeded by György Surányi
