= Statue of Saint George, Prague Castle =

Statue in Prague, Czech Republic

Statue of Saint George
- Socha svatého Jiří (Czech)
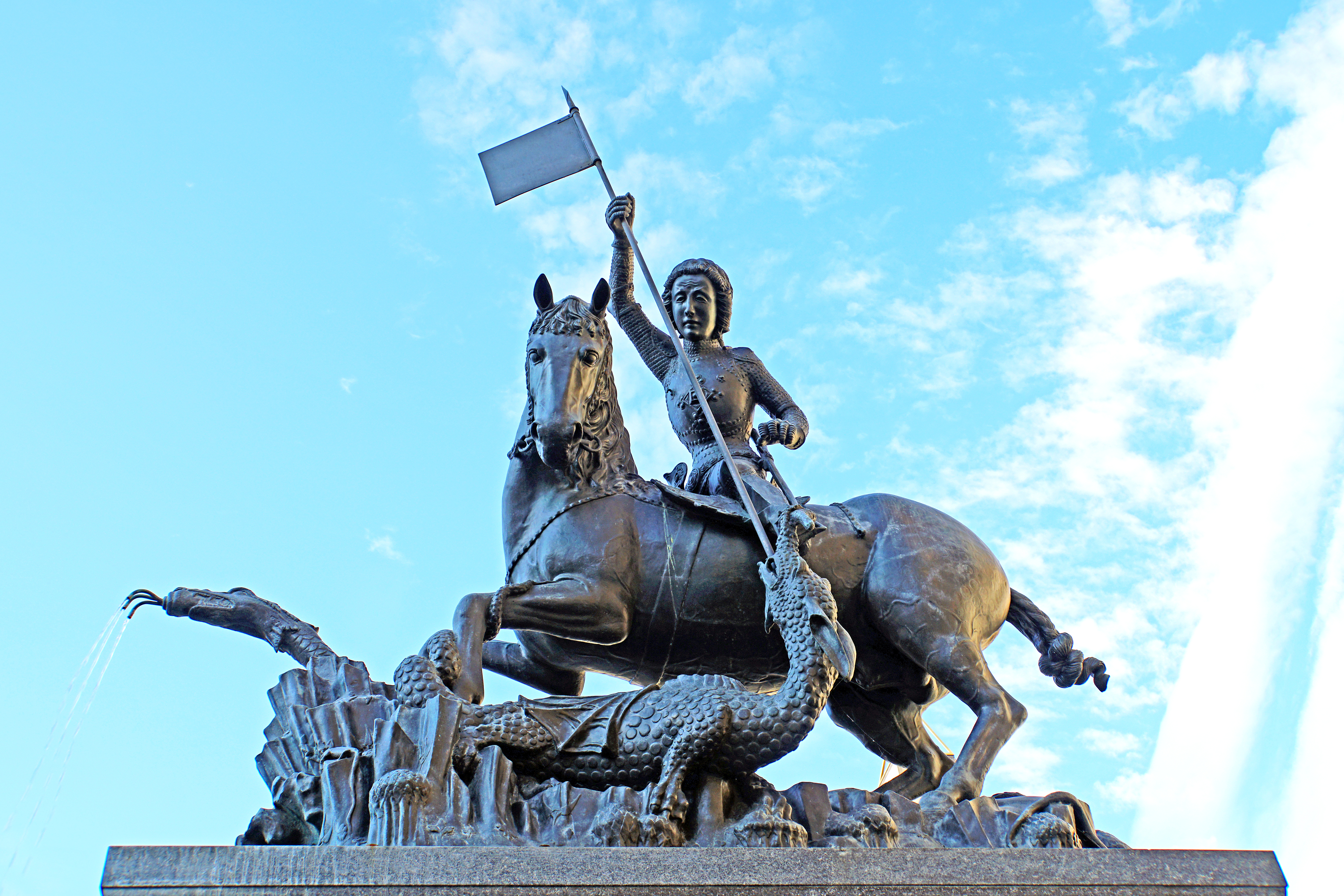
- The statue in 2016
- Artist: Martin & Georg of "Clussenberch"
- Year: 1373
- Medium: Bronze sculpture
- Location: Prague, Czech Republic; 50.0903°N 14.4004°E

The equestrian statue of Saint George (Czech: Socha svatého Jiří) is installed at Prague Castle in Prague, Czech Republic. The bronze sculpture was created in 1373 by Transylvanian Saxon sculptors Martin and Georg of "Clussenberch", today's Cluj (Martinum et Georgium de Clussenberch in the Latin inscription, in which the dialectal Saxon city name is used). The statue was probably cast in Nagyvárad/Großwardein, today's Oradea, where two other works by the two brothers have stood in the dome square until being melted for their metal in the 17th century during the Turkish wars.

According to a Hungarian blog, the statue was first erected in the main church of Bratislava, then moved to Königgrätz, and was only brought to Prague in 1471. It speculates that Louis I (1342–1382) presented it as a gift to Emperor Charles IV.

The statue was made with the lost-wax casting method, and was turned into a fountain statue in the 16th century.
