= Mátyás Tímár =

Hungarian politician (1923–2020)

Minister of Finance of Hungary
- In office 27 November 1962 – 14 April 1967
- Prime Minister: János Kádár; Gyula Kállai
- Preceded by: Rezső Nyers
- Succeeded by: Péter Vályi

Personal details
- Born: 10 July 1923
- Died: c. 16 February 2020 (aged 96)
- Party: MSZMP
- Profession: politician, economist

Mátyás Tímár (10 July 1923 – c. 16 February 2020) was a Hungarian politician and economist, who served as Minister of Finance between 1962 and 1967, and Deputy Prime Minister since April 1967. He also held the office of Governor of the Hungarian National Bank from 10 July 1975 to 15 June 1988.

Political offices
Preceded by Rezső Nyers	Minister of Finance; 1962–1967	Succeeded by Péter Vályi
Preceded by Andor László	Governor of the Hungarian National Bank; 1975–1988	Succeeded by Ferenc Bartha
