= Lovasberény =

- Location of Fejér county in Hungary

- Location of Lovasberény
- Coordinates: 47.31226°N 18.54786°E
- Country: Hungary
- County: Fejér

Area
  - Total: 60.62 km^{2} (23.41 sq mi)

Population (2004)
  - Total: 2,713
  - Density: 44.75/km^{2} (115.9/sq mi)
- Time zone: UTC+1 (CET)
  - Summer (DST): UTC+2 (CEST)
- Postal code: 8093
- Area code: 22
- Website: www.lovasbereny.hu

Lovasberény is a village in Fejér county, Hungary.

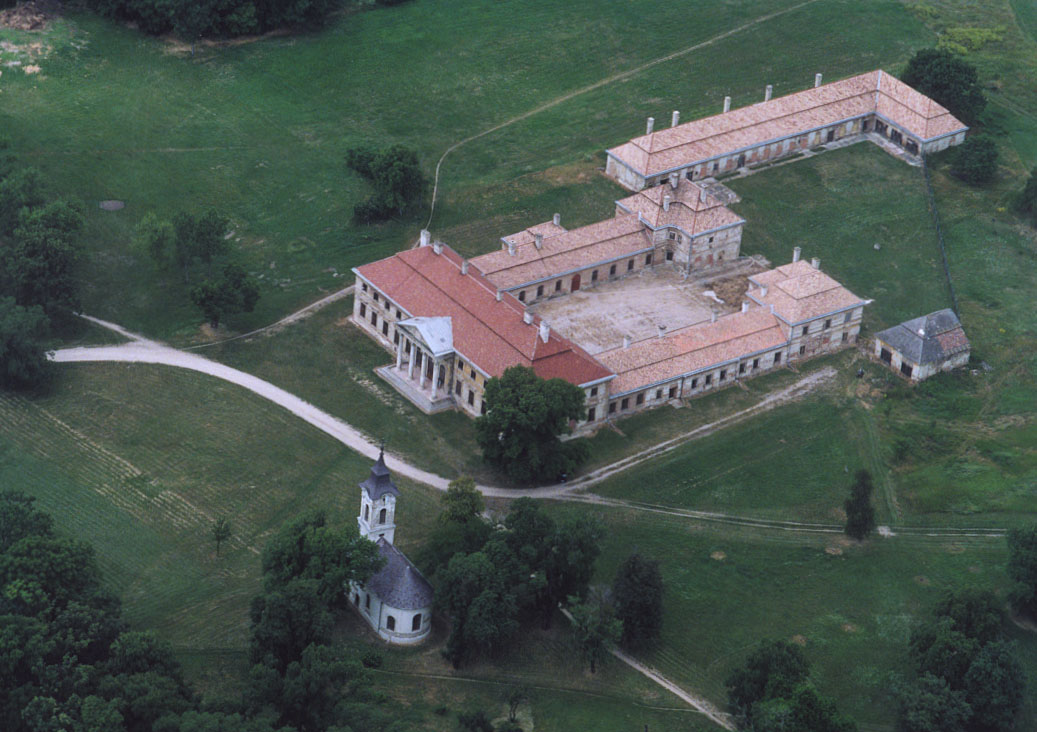
Aerial photography of Lovasberény palace
