= E-flux publications =

e-flux journal
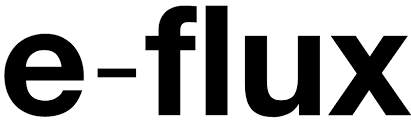
- Editor: Julieta Aranda, Stephen Squibb, Anton Vidokle, Brian Kuan Wood
- Categories: Contemporary art
- Frequency: Monthly
- First issue: 2009
- Country: United States
- Website: www.e-flux.com/journals/

e-flux produces both the e-flux journal and e-flux journal reader series. The monthly art publication e-flux journal features essays and contributions by contemporary artists and thinkers. The e-flux journal reader series was initiated in 2009 as a joint imprint with Sternberg Press.

== History ==
In 2009, e-flux began distributing the printed version of the journal as a PDF-to-print edition designed by Adam Florin at bookshops and art spaces around the world through a network of distributors. The first issue of e-flux journal was published in December 2008. Shortly after The Building, Berlin presented the e-flux journal as exhibition as part of their public programming, producing issues 0, 1, 2 and 3 in the space over the course of the year. As the editorial collective explained, "(t)his first presentation of e-flux journal in Berlin (was) a prototype for what a small art space such as The Building can do with this system."

In 2014 Mark Sladen wrote "e-flux journal focuses primarily on long-form texts, with little effort to style the reading environment or to employ complex audiovisual elements. It could be argued that the journal's simplicity is its strength, as the publication's lack of formatting—and lack of large audiovisual files—means that it flows with greater ease across a multitude of devices. But it does this by making text its unchallenged king."

Since 2010, e-flux journal has regularly produced thematic issues, often guest edited by writers and thinkers such as Irit Rogoff, Boris Groys, Anselm Franke and Carlos Motta. These issues are often accompanied by symposia and events at e-flux on the same theme.

== Reader series ==
In 2009 e-flux journal began publishing a series of paperback readers under a joint imprint with Sternberg Press.

e-flux journal reader 2009 is a selection of essays that sought to highlight ongoing topical threads that ran throughout the first eight issues of e-flux journal in order to give a sense of the varied concerns and urgencies engaged at the time of its publication. The compilation is edited by Julieta Aranda, Brian Kuan Wood, Anton Vidokle, with essays by Boris Groys, Hito Steyerl, Liam Gillick, Monika Szewczyk, Luis Camnitzer, Raqs Media Collective, Sean Snyder, Tom Holert, Irit Rogoff, Dieter Roelstraete, Marion von Osten, Gean Moreno and Ernesto Oroza, Michael Baers.

What Is Contemporary Art? (June 2010) is a book that began as a two-part issue of e-flux journal devoted to the question: What is contemporary art? Critics, curators, artists and writers who were invited to contribute included Julieta Aranda, Brian Kuan Wood, Anton Vidokle, Cuauhtémoc Medina, Boris Groys, Raqs Media Collective, Hans Ulrich Obrist, Hu Fang, Jörg Heiser, Martha Rosler, Zdenka Badovinac, Carol Yinghua Lu, Dieter Roelstraete, and Jan Verwoert.

Boris Groys' Going Public is the third in the ongoing series of books published by e-flux journal with Sternberg Press. The text questions the role of art in a world where all things are understood to be sources of aesthetic experience. Considering the position of the producer, rather than spectator, Groys upends stale aesthetic and sociological analysis of art, instead posing the epistemological question of why art exists in the first place.

Are You Working Too Much? Post-Fordism, Precarity, and the Labor of Art (June 2011) is a collection of texts from e-flux's online and print journal edited by Julieta Aranda, Brian Kuan Wood, and Anton Vidokle with contributions from Antke Engel, Hito Steyerl, Liam Gillick, Tom Holert, Irit Rogoff, Marion von Osten, Diedrich Diederichsen, Lars Bang Larsen, Keti Chukhrov, Franco Berardi, and the Precarious Workers Brigade. As Eva Kenny explains in her review, "Something that comes across strongly from these texts is the notion that capitalism, while very enthusiastic and hardworking, is perhaps not particularly imaginative. Can it think up its own forms of subjugation or does it rely heavily on someone else to do this? A theoretical but nonetheless dramatic standoff is one of the outcomes of this shortcoming: while capitalism in its current incarnation cuts arts funding and starves artists out of their old neighborhoods, watching them fight like gladiators the better to learn even more strategic and cut-throat ways of surviving hard times, art is at the same time pulling the wool over capitalism's eyes with its ridiculous and inexplicable approaches to absolutely everything."

Moscow Symposium: Conceptualism Revisited (May 2012) is based on the conference Revisiting Conceptual Art: the Russian Case in an International Context, which took place at the Central House of Writers in Moscow in April 2011, organized by Boris Groys and the Stella Art Foundation in advance of the 54th Venice Biennale to address the interest of conceptual art of the 1960s and 70s in the international and Russian art scenes. Beyond the view that multiple, globally dispersed conceptual art practices provide a heterogeneity of cultural references, Andrei Monastyrski and Collective Actions propose much more: other dimensions altogether, other spatiotemporal politics, other timescales, other understandings of matter, other forms of life–not only as works, but as a basic condition for being able to perceive artworks in the first place.

Through The Wretched of the Screen (September 2012) we begin to see how Hito Steyerl's writing, even if the hopes and desires for coherent collective political projects have been displaced onto images and screens, it is precisely here that we must look frankly at the technology that seals them in.The Wretched of the Screen collects a number of Steyerl's landmark essays from recent years in which she has steadily developed her very own politics of the image. According to critic Tony Wood, Steyerl's writing explains how "the link between political and cultural representation, never straightforward, has become profoundly unstable in the image-saturated neoliberal era; we live in 'an age of unrepresentable people and an overpopulation of images', in which 'a growing number of unmoored and floating images corresponds to a growing number of disenfranchised, invisible or even disappeared or missing people.'"

Culture Class (September 2013) is a collection of essays written by Martha Rosler between 2010 and 2012 and presents her most extensive update to her consideration of the role of artists in world culture and in urban gentrification since her landmark 1989 project If You Lived Here ... "Writing in direct response to Richard Florida's book The Rise of the Creative Class," Abbe Schriber states that "Rosler problematizes Florida's definition of creative workers as driving urban economic success, exploring the notion that artistic labor 'cannot be conflated with neoliberal urban political regimes,' as sociologist Ann Markusen has put it."

Forthcoming (2014) is the second edition of Forthcoming, a book by the Beirut-based writer Jalal Toufic, published by Atelos Press in Berkeley, California in 2001.

The Internet Does Not Exist launched at Friends with Books: Art Book Fair Berlin. The texts included in this reader address the paradox of our immaterial social fabric in the post-Internet age. This reader is edited by Julieta Aranda, Brian Kuan Wood, and Anton Vidokle and includes texts from Hito Steyerl, Keller Easterling, Bruno Latour, Ursula K. Heise, Gean Moreno, Franco "Bifo" Berardi, Diedrich Diederichsen, Rasmus Fleischer, Jon Rich, Geert Lovink, Brian Kuan Wood and Joana Hadjithomas / Khalil Joreige, Hans Ulrich Obrist and Julian Assange, Metahaven, Benjamin Bratton, and Patricia MacCormack.

== Events and projects ==
e-flux journal began participating in the NY Art Book Fair (NYABF) in 2009. Since then the journal has exhibited and organized events in the 2010, 2011 and 2014 fairs.

=== Art book fairs ===
In 2011 the journal presented the e-flux book coop, "a mobile home for publications" at MoMA PS1 as part of the NY Art Book Fair, hosting the project in a trailer parked in the PS1 courtyard. After the fair closed, PS1 requested to keep the Book Coop on view for a year. Initially presented at Art Basel as part of the e-flux Kopfbau project, the e-flux book coop features art books, magazines, and other types of publications from members of the e-flux journal network. A group of over 200 international art centers, art book stores, and independent publishers self-publish and distribute the print-on-demand e-flux journal. As e-flux explained, "Each member sends us a selection of around 5-8 titles and we sell them on their behalf at the price requested. We return sales less a tiny amount, which the book coop retains for operational costs. So there's a lot of trust involved, especially so when we first began developing the project."

In 2013 e-flux journal also participated in the Los Angeles Art Book Fair, presenting Art Between the Cracks: Sylvere Lotringer in conversation with Anton Vidokle as part of the inaugural edition of the fair's programming. As part of e-flux journal's participation at the 2014 New York Art Book Fair, Brian Kuan Wood and McKenzie Wark held an event to discuss how the consolidation of finance and art asks for an update to the task of what Wark has termed "the hacker class" in "the classroom ... an informal venue for artists, writers and publishers to feature new releases and present their publications." In 2014 the journal joined Friends with Books: Art Book Fair Berlin, launching the 2015 co-publication with Sternberg Press, The Internet Does Not Exist. Taking the form of a mini-symposium with Metahaven, Julieta Aranda and Ana Teixeira Pinto, Hito Steyerl, Diedrich Diederichsen, and others.

=== Venice Bienniale ===
In 2015, e-flux journal was invited to participate in the 56th Venice Biennale, All the World's Futures curated by Okwui Enwezor.

== Logo/design ==
The e-flux journal reader series logo was designed by Liam Gillick in 2009 for the first publication of the series, e-flux journal reader 2009. Gillick says that the three parallel lines that constitute the logo refer to his 2009 text Maybe it would be better if we worked in groups of three? Part 1 of 2: The Discursive. The text addresses how discursive practices "play[s] with social models and present[s] speculative constructs both within and beyond traditional gallery spaces." Gillick goes on to assert that "(t)he site of production today often exists within the text alone."

Issues 0, 1, 2 and 3 of the e-flux journal were designed by Francesca Grassi and Jeff Ramsey, after which the e-flux journal layout generator was developed by Adam Florin, an "automated system to turn blog-like, long-scrolling-column HTML into rich, print-ready PDFs with more a varied visual depth and flow." The layout generator was developed in dialog with Jeff Ramsey who has stayed on as the designer for the e-flux journal.

== Notable contributors ==
The following artists, researchers, curators, historians, and others have contributed writing or images to e-flux journal:

- Mary Walling Blackburn
- Hito Steyerl
- Liam Gillick
- Boris Groys
- Paul B. Preciado
- McKenzie Wark

== See also ==
- e-flux
- SUPERCOMMUNITY
- Accelerationism
- Julieta Aranda
- Anton Vidokle
