= Anton Vidokle =

Russian artist (born 1965)

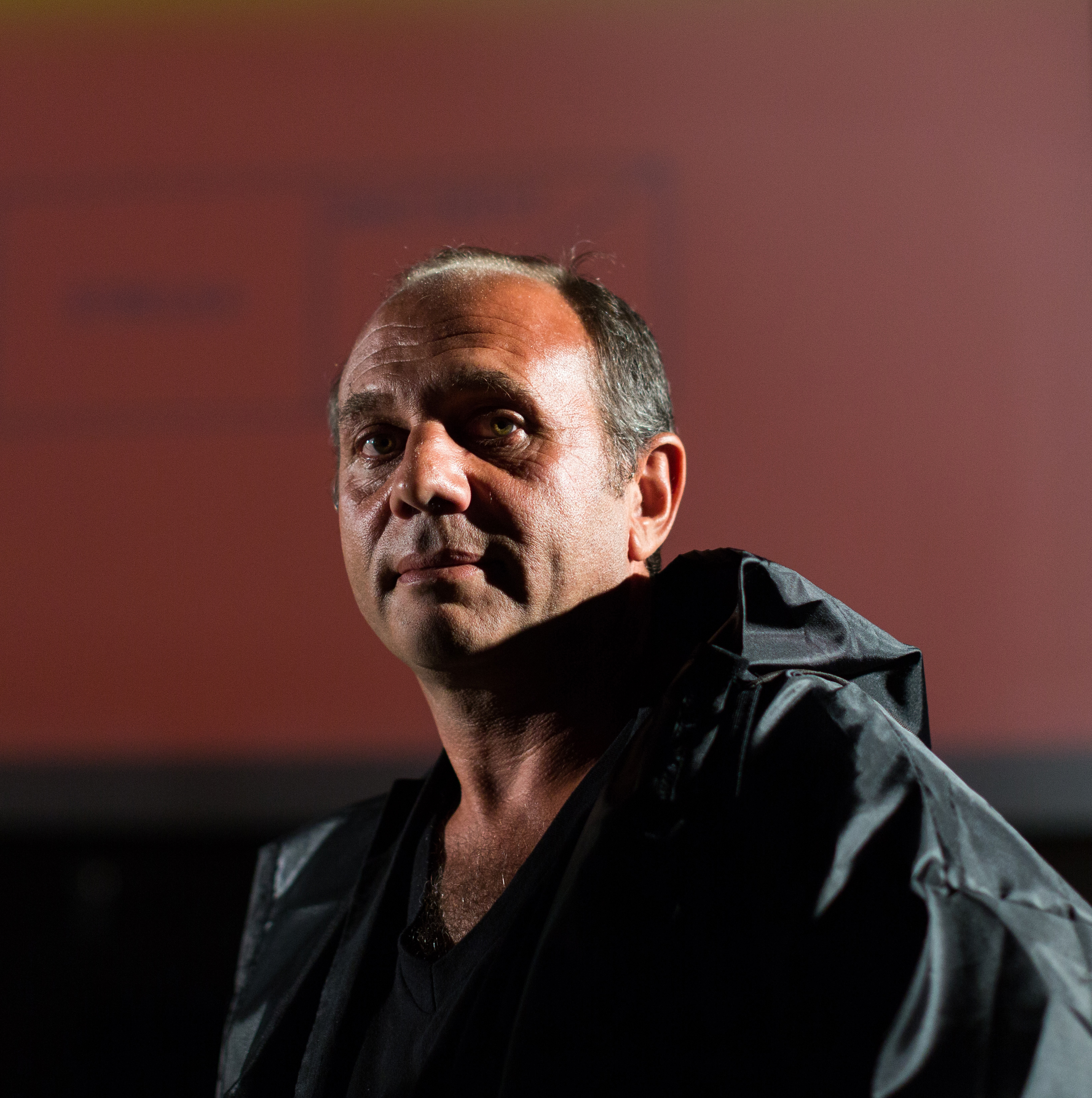
- Born: Антон Видокле; 1965; Moscow, Russia
- Website: http://www.e-flux.com/

Anton Vidokle is an artist and founder of e-flux. Born in 1965, Vidokle lives in New York and Berlin.

== Work ==
In 2004 Vidokle co-organized e-flux video rental with Julieta Aranda, which traveled to Berlin, Frankfurt; Extra City, Antwerp; Carpenter Center, Harvard University and others. As founder of e-flux, he has produced projects such as Next Documenta Should Be Curated by an Artist (curated by Jens Hoffmann), Do it (curated by Hans-Ulrich Obrist), Utopia Station poster project, and organized An Image Bank for Everyday Revolutionary Life (based on the image archive of David Alfaro Siqueiros) and Martha Rosler Library.

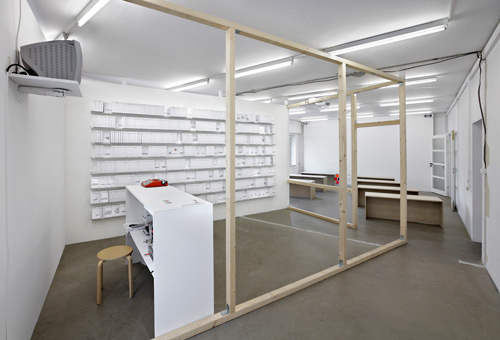
e-flux Video Rental in Berlin, 2008.

In 2005, Vidokle initiated research into education as site for artistic practice as co-curator for Manifesta 6, which was canceled. In response to the cancellation, Vidokle set up an independent project in Berlin called Unitednationsplaza (2006–2007) a twelve-month project involving more than a hundred artists, writers, philosophers, and diverse audiences. Located behind a supermarket in East Berlin, Unitednationsplaza's program featured public seminars, lectures, screenings, performances and various projects. In 2008 Unitednationsplaza traveled to Mexico City and was hosted by PAC, and opened in New York's New Museum for Contemporary Art under the name Nightschool (2008–2009).

In 2008, with Brian Kuan Wood and Julieta Aranda, Vidokle founded the e-flux journal, a monthly online publication on art and critical theory with contributions from writers such as Hito Steyerl, Martha Rosler, Liam Gillick, Boris Groys, Franco Berardi (Bifo), Jalal Toufic, Slavoj Žižek, Raqs Media Collective and others. The journal's international readership has led to the translation and republishing of many of the journal's essays.

Jointly with the Sternberg Press, Berlin, e-flux journal started a new imprint which has put out a series of paperback readers consisting of monographic publications and thematic compilations of essays, including: What is Contemporary Art? (2010); Boris Groys: Going Public (2010), Are You Working Too Much? Post Fordism, Precarity, and the Labor of Art (2011), Moscow Symposium: Conceptualism Revisited (2012), Hito Steyerl: The Wretched of the Screen (2012), Martha Rosler: Culture Class (2013), Jalal Toufic: Forthcoming (2014), The Internet Does Not Exist (2015), Benjamin H. Bratton: Dispute Plan to Prevent Future Luxury Constitution (2015), What’s Love (or Care, Intimacy, Warmth, Affection) Got to Do with It? (2017), and Art Without Death: Conversations on Russian Cosmism (2017). In 2015, e-flux journal initiated a new book series entitled e-flux Classics, distributed by University of Minnesota Press. The first book in the series is Avant Garde Museology (2015), edited by Arseny Zhilyaev.

In 2008, Vidokle and Aranda created a time bank for artistic community. The Time/Bank is a platform where artists, curators, writers and others in the arts can help each other get things done without use of money, but exchanging their time and skills. Time/Bank has nearly 4,000 members from many cities around the world and operates several branches in Den Haag, Moscow, Berlin, Frankfurt and other cities.

At e-flux space in New York, Vidokle directs a program of exhibitions that has included solo shows by Martha Rosler, Gustav Metzger, Adam Curtis, Raqs Media Collective, Mladen Stilinovic, Alan Sekula, Andrei Monastirsky & Collective Actions, Walter Benjamin and Laure Prouvost; as well as group exhibitions such as the Agency of Unrealized Projects, curated jointly with Hans Ulrich Obrist; Animism, curated by Anselm Franke; Out Now, with Paul Chan, Trevor Paglen, Martha Rosler, Natascha Sadr Haghighian, Rirkrit Tiravanija and Jalal Toufic; We, The Outsiders, curated by Chus Martinez; Spectres of Communism: Contemporary Russian Art, curated by Boris Groys; So You Want To See, curated by What, How & for Whom; and Corruption: Everybody Knows…, curated by Natasha Ginwala.

From 2013-2014, Vidokle was a Resident Professor with Jalal Toufic at Ashkal Alwan’s Home Workspace Program in Beirut, Lebanon, under the title "Creating and Dispersing Universes that Work without Working," during which Vidokle organized the exhibition, A Museum of Immortality, curated by Boris Groys.

For the 56th Venice Biennale in 2015, e-flux journal was commissioned to produce SUPERCOMMUNITY, an editorial project that addresses e-flux journal and its readership as the supercommunity and presented a daily piece of writing that often adopted the form of poetry, short fiction or screenplay. It has featured contributions from nearly one hundred authors, anthropologists, artists, philosophers, poets, theorists and writers.

Vidokle frequently lectures and participates in international conferences and symposia and has contributed essays and texts to various publications including October, Frieze and A Prior, as well as numerous books and catalogues. He has also published a number of key texts as part of e-flux journal, including Art Without Artists (2010), Art Without Work (2011), and Breaking the Contract (2012).

In 2023, Vidokle served as chief curator of the 14th Shanghai Biennale titled Cosmos Cinema, collaborating with Hallie Ayres, Lukas Brasiskis, Ben Eastham, and Zairong Xiang to present the nine-part exhibition at Power Station of Art. Inspired by Russian and Chinese philosophy as well as ancient and Indigenous tales of the cosmos, immortality, and space travel in relation to conditions of life on earth, Cosmos Cinema featured a wide range of installation and moving-image work by artists Trevor Paglen, Sung Tieu, Rosalind Nashashibi, Saodat Ismailova, He Zike, Carsten Nicolai with Dorit Chrysler and Ken Niibori, among nearly 80 others. A catalogue of the exhibition was produced in both English and Chinese editions, co-published by Sternberg Press and Power Station of Art.

Citizens of the Cosmos, a monograph on Vidokle’s films in relation to Cosmist philosophy, was co-published by Sternberg Press and Sirius Arts Centre in 2024 featuring contributions by Franco “Bifo” Berardi, Keti Chukhrov, Liam Gillick, Boris Groys, Daniel Muzyczuk, Miguel Amado and Georgia Perkins, Elizabeth Povinelli, and Raqs Media Collective.

== Selected films ==
Anton Vidokle has directed a number of films including A Guiding Light with Liam Gillick (2010), which considered the curatorial premise of the 8th Shanghai Biennale; and New York Conversations (2010), a film based on the collaborative project that took place in 2008 with Nico Dockx and Rirkrit Tiravanija for A Prior magazine. In 2012, Vidokle directed Two Suns with Hu Fang, which was included in the Taipei Biennial (2012). The trilogy 2084: a science fiction show (2012–2014), directed with Pelin Tan, has been included in a number of exhibitions and screenings including Or Gallery, Vancouver (2012); Bergen Assembly (2013); La Biennale de Montréal (2014); Istanbul Biennial (2015); Home Works Forum 7, Beirut (2015); and Museum of Modern Art Warsaw (2016).

Vidokle’s project Immortality For All: A Film Trilogy on Russian Cosmism (2014–2017) probes Russian Cosmism’s influence on the twentieth century and suggests its relevance to the present day. In Part One he returns to the foundations of Cosmist thought (This Is Cosmos, 2014). Part Two explores the links between cosmology and politics (The Communist Revolution Was Caused By The Sun, 2015) and Part Three restages the museum as a site of resurrection, a central Cosmist idea (Immortality and Resurrection for All!, 2017). The trilogy premiered at Locarno Film Festival in 2017. It was also the central work in the exhibition Art Without Death: Russian Cosmism at Haus der Kulteren der Welt, Berlin in 2017.

This Is Cosmos has been exhibited and screened internationally at the Shanghai Biennale (2014); Specters of Communism: Contemporary Russian Art, curated by Boris Groys at the James Gallery, CUNY Center for Graduate Studies, New York (2015); Art In The Age Of...Energy and Raw Material, Witte de With, Rotterdam (2015); 65th Berlinale International Film Festival, Forum Expanded, Berlin (2015); ASTRONOMY. Incursions into the cosmos, La Casa Encendida, Madrid (2015); IndieLisboa Film Festival (2015); LABoral Centro de Arte y Creación Industrial, Spain (2016); Bucharest International Experimental Film Festival 2016 BIEFF (2016); Visual Culture Research Center, Kyiv (2016); and the Stanislavsky Theatre, Moscow (2016).

The Communist Revolution Was Caused By The Sun has been shown internationally at the 6th Moscow Biennale, Moscow (2015); 66th Berlinale International Film Festival, Forum Expanded, Berlin (2016); Beyond the Globe | 8th Triennial of Contemporary Art – U3, Ljubljana (2016); Stedelijk Museum, Amsterdam (2016); 7th Gwangju Biennale, where it was the recipient of the Noon Award (2016); Visual Culture Research Center, Kyiv, (2016); Berlinale Spotlight, India (2016); Far From Moscow Film Festival, Los Angeles (2016); Tate St Ives (2016); Okayama Art Summit (2016); 33rd Kassel Documentary Film and Video Festival (2016); the Centre Pompidou, Paris (2016); and the Stanislavsky Theatre, Moscow (2016).

In 2019, Vidokle made Citizens of the Cosmos, a film comprising tableaus of ritualistic motions in contemporary Japan, paired with a gradual narration of Alexander Svyatogor's 1922 Manifesto of Biocosmism. Shot between Kyiv and Tokyo, and featuring an original soundtrack by Alva Noto, the film screened at the 2020 Berlinale and in 2019 at the Art of the Real Film Festival, New York. It featured in eponymous solo exhibitions at Muzeum Sztuki w Łodzi, Poland (2022); Tretyakov Gallery, Moscow, Russia; Rampa, Porto, Portugal (2021).

Vidokle’s film Autotrofia (2020–23) was produced on-location in collaboration with residents in Oliveto Lucano, Italy. Blending scripted and fictional scenarios with observational footage of a local pagan harvest festival, the film juxtaposes Cosmist writing by painter Vassily Chekrygin and scientist Vladimir Vernadsky with the ancient heritage of the southern Italian town. The script was translated by Franco “Bifo” Berardi, with music composed by Alva Noto.

Vidokle co-directed Gilgamesh: She Who Saw the Deep (2022) with sociologist and art historian Pelin Tan. The film is a re-telling of the story of Gilgamesh, ruler of Uruk, seeking immortality after the death of Enkidu. Russian Cosmism entwines with Sumerian cosmology in scenes shot along the Tigris River on the grounds of ancient cities Mardin, Hasankeyf, and Dara. Musician Alva Noto composed the soundtrack.

Films include:

- A Crime Against Art (2008), directed by Hila Peleg
- A Guiding Light (2010), with Liam Gillick
- New York Conversations (2011)
- Two Suns (2012) with Hu Fang
- 2084: A science fiction show, Episodes 1, 2 & 3 (2012–2014), directed by Anton Vidokle and Pelin Tan
- This is Cosmos (2014)
- The Communist Revolution Was Caused By The Sun (2015)
- Immortality and Resurrection For All! (2017)
- Citizens of the Cosmos (2019)
- AIOU (2019), with Adam Khalil and Bayley Sweitzer
- Autotrofia (2020–2023)
- Gilgamesh: She Who Saw the Deep (2022), with Pelin Tan

== See also ==
- e-flux
- e-flux publications
- SUPERCOMMUNITY
- Julieta Aranda
