= Ekaterina Degot =

Russian art historian

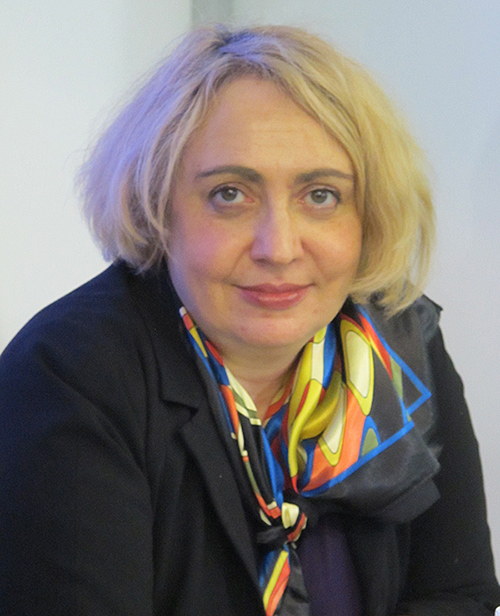
Ekaterina Degot in 2012

Ekaterina Yurievna Degot (Russian: Екатерина Юрьевна Дёготь; born December 2, 1958, Moscow) is a Russian art historian, art writer, and curator based in Graz, Austria.

== Biography ==
A member of the Russian Academy of Fine Arts, she received her doctoral degree in art history, specializing in Russian art of the 20th century and Russian contemporary art. She has worked as a senior curator at the State Tretyakov Gallery, art columnist at the Russian daily newspaper Kommersant, and senior editor from 2008 to 2012 at an independent online magazine dedicated to art news, art criticism, and cultural analysis—www.openspace.ru/art. She is a regular contributor to international art journals and magazines such as Artforum, frieze, and e-flux magazine. She has taught at the European University at Saint Petersburg and the Alexander Rodchenko School of Photography and New Media in Moscow and held guest professorships at various American and European universities. In 2013, she was Artistic Director of the first Bergen Assembly in Norway. In 2014, she was appointed Artistic Director of Academy of the Arts of the World, Cologne. In 2017, she was appointed Director and Chief Curator of Steirischer Herbst, Graz.

== Curated exhibitions ==
- (with Julia Demidenko). 2000. Body Memory: Underwear of the Soviet Era. City History Museum (St Petersburg), City Museum (Helsinki), Volkskundemuseum (Vienna), et al.
- 2001. The Russian Pavilion. The Venice Biennale.
- (with Jürgen Harten et al.). 2003-04. Moscow--Berlin 1950–-2000. Martin-Gropius-Bau (Berlin), the History Museum (Moscow).
- 2005a. The Comedy: the Funny Side of a Moving Image. Central House of Artists (Moscow).
- 2005b. Soviet Idealism. Musee de l’art wallon (Liège).
- 2009. European Atelier: Russian Artists on Europe. Central House of Artists (Moscow).
- (with Cosmin Costinas and David Riff) 2010. Shockworkers of the Mobile Image. First Ural Industrial Biennial (Yekaterinburg).
- (with Joanna Mytkowska and David Riff) 2011. Auditorium Moscow. Fourth Moscow Biennale.
- (with Anton Vidokle and Julieta Aranda) 2012. Time/Food. Stella Art Foundation (Moscow).
- (with David Riff) 2013. Monday Begins on Saturday. First Bergen Assembly.
- (with Yuri Albert) 2013–14. What Did the Artist Want to Say with That? Moscow Museum of Modern Art.

== Books ==
- 1995. Contemporary Painting in Russia. Sidney: Craftsman House.
- 1998. Terroristicheskii naturalizm [Terrorist naturalism]. [In Russian]. Moscow: Ad Marginem.
- 2000. Russkoe iskusstvo XX-go veka [Russian art of the 20th century]. [In Russian]. Moscow: Trilistnik.
- (and Vadim Zakharov). 2005. Moskovskii kont︠s︡eptualizm [Moscow conceptualism]. [In Russian]. Moscow: Izdatelstvo WAM.
- (ed., with Joseph Backstein and Boris Groys) 2010.Glasnost: Soviet Non-Conformist Art from the 1980s. London: Haunch of Venison.
- (ed. with Marta Dziewańska and Ilya Budraitskis) 2013. Post-Post-Soviet? Art, Politics and Art, Politics and Society in Russia at the Turn of the Decade. Warsaw: Museum of Modern Art in Warsaw.
- (ed., with David Riff and Jan Sowa) 2021. Perverse Decolonization? Berlin: Archive Books.

== Distinctions ==
- 1995. “Courant d’Est” Fellowship, Centre Pompidou, Paris.
- 1998. Fulbright Scholarship.
- 1999. Virginia Hanks Distinguished Visiting Curatorship, Duke University Museum of Art.
- 2003. Zentrum für Literaturforschung Fellowship, Berlin.
- 2004. “Post Communist Condition” Fellowship. ZKM Karlsruhe.
- 2004. Visiting Curatorship. Jane Voorhoos Zimmerli Museum of Art, New Brunswick, NJ.
- 2014. Igor Zabel Award for Culture and Theory
- 2020. Power 100: Most influential people in the contemporary artworld, Art Review (place 54)
- 2020 and 2024. Top 100: Most important people in the art world, Monopol (magazine)
