= E-flux =

Publishing platform and archive, artist project, curatorial platform, and e-mail service

Coordinates: 40.714589°N 73.982481°W

e-flux is a publishing platform and archive, artist project, curatorial platform, and e-mail service founded in 1998. The arts news digests, events, exhibitions, schools, journal, books, and art projects produced and/or disseminated by e-flux describe strains of critical discourse surrounding contemporary art, culture, and theory internationally. Its monthly publication, e-flux journal, has produced essays commissioned since 2008 about cultural, political, and structural paradigms that inform contemporary artistic production.

== History ==
In November 1998, curators Regine Basha and Christoph Gerozissis, along with artist Anton Vidokle organized the group exhibition The Best Surprise is No Surprise at the Holiday Inn in Chinatown, Manhattan. Basha, Gerozissis, and Vidokle used e-mail, then a new communication technology, to disseminate the press release for the 12-hour, all-night exhibition. The exhibition featured works by Tomoko Takahashi, Michel Auder, and Carsten Nicolai. The e-mailed press release attracted the attendance of hundreds of guests to the show. Acknowledging the potential of e-mail as a tool for the dissemination of information among arts communities, Vidokle launched e-flux one month later.

As e-flux's readership grew to more than 20,000 international artists, curators, and critics from 1998 through 2003, e-flux was based in a one-room apartment at 344A Greenwich Street, New York City, where work on e-flux was combined with experimental exhibitions such as Infra-Slim. In 2003, the artist Julieta Aranda began collaborating with Vidokle on e-flux.

In 2008, e-flux moved to a storefront at 41 Essex Street in New York, where they hosted New York Conversations. Also in 2008, Brian Kuan Wood joined Aranda and Vidokle as an editor of e-flux journal.

In 2011, e-flux relocated its activities to 311 East Broadway in New York's Lower East Side. The three floors encompassed an exhibition space, offices, and an event space. In addition to the daily operations of e-flux and e-flux journal, the location accommodated a year-round exhibition and programming schedule that was accessible to the public free of charge.

As of December 2021, e-flux operates out of a space in 172 Classon Avenue in Brooklyn. The e-flux Screening Room hosts a series of film screenings.

== Projects ==
In 2003, e-flux launched The Next Documenta Should Be Curated By An Artist, a project curated by Jens Hoffmann, which featured reflections of a group of artists upon the conditions of the relationship between artists and curators.

EVR (e-flux video rental) (2004–present) is a video archive, a projection space, and a free video rental. The project was conceived in 2004 and was subsequently presented at various locations around the world, with the inventory of videos continuously increasing with selections made by local curators, artists, and critics. Currently, the project archive comprises over 950 videos. In 2010, the artists donated e-flux video rental to the permanent collection of the Museum of Modern Art (Ljubljana) where it is on permanent display.

In 2007, Julieta Aranda in collaboration with the unitednationsplaza program in Berlin, invited the artist Ricardo Valentim to present his work Film Festival. This two-month-long screening series (January 19 through March 9, 2007) included a selection of educational films commissioned by the United Nations and the US Department of Education in addition to other agencies in the 1950s through the 1980s. The reels, purchased by Valentim on eBay, included "documentaries about indigenous African peoples, historical figures, and natural phenomena that exemplify Western visions of the world from the postwar period until the `80s, demonstrating how the ideological apparatus of the state builds a biased image of reality."

In 2007, after having seen Donald Judd's library in Marfa, Texas, Vidokle asked Martha Rosler if he could borrow and install her personal library at e-flux as a public reading room. Comprising more than 7,000 volumes selected from the books at Martha Rosler's residence and studio in Brooklyn and academic office in New Jersey, the Martha Rosler Library was accessible for public use at e-flux's Ludlow Street location in New York City and then traveled to art organizations throughout Europe.

Originally established by artists Julieta Aranda and Anton Vidokle in New York in 2008, with an inventory of 60 works by invited artists Pawnshop, which operated as a pawnbroker, but using art as collateral, went bankrupt at the beginning of the world financial crises, only to re-open successfully in Beijing, Art Basel, and at the third Thessaloniki Biennial in 2011. Both an exhibition and an artwork in itself, Pawnshop mediates the complex choreography of art and money. As a functional pawnshop, it has an inventory of over 100 art works, some made specifically for this occasion. Contributing artists include: Armando Andrade Tudela, Michel Auder, Michael Baers, Luis Berríos-Negrón, Marc Bijl, Andrea Büttner, Joseph Grigely, K8 Hardy, Annika Larsson, Ken Lum, Gustav Metzger, Bernardo Ortiz, Olivia Plender, Julia Scher, Tino Sehgal, and Bik Van der Pol, among others.

Initiated in 2010, Time/Bank is a network with branches in eleven cities, where time currency (designed by Lawrence Weiner) can be obtained in exchange for other currencies: biological time, ideas, services, and commodities. Time/Bank proposes an alternative economy in which individuals and groups in the cultural fields can trade time, skills, and commodities to get things done while circumventing money. As critic Jessica Loudis explained, "By sticking 60 indisputably valuable artworks in a pawnshop, e-flux forced a clash between contradictory models of value, momentarily transforming a holding cell for unwanted or useless but valuable goods into a kind of gallery space. With the distance between goods and capital ever increasing—or at least, goods and our ability to value them—Time/Bank picks up where Pawnshop leaves off, creating a nearly closed system that’s pegged entirely to use value.” One iteration of Time/Bank has been Time/Food, which took place at Abrons Arts Center in New York in 2011. Time/Bank has appeared as an exhibition and outpost at dOCUMENTA (13), Portikus, and elsewhere.

After moving to 311 East Broadway, e-flux maintained its exhibition program, inaugurating the new space with shows of work by Hito Steyerl and Adam Curtis and on the topic of animism, among other things.

In 2018, e-flux partnered with MoMA to produce an evening of discussions on cosmism. The event came as a result of a growing interest in cosmism by e-flux founder Anton Vidokle and e-flux journal contributors Boris Groys, Hito Steyerl, Arseny Zhilyaev, and others.

e-flux began hosting exhibitions again in December 2018, with a show organized as part of a years-long project about Hubert Fichte initiated by Haus der Kulturen der Welt and Goethe-Institut. The iteration of the project shown at e-flux was produced in partnership with Participant, Inc. Since 2018, e-flux exhibitions have highlighted work by Metahaven, Goldin+Senneby, the Rojava Film Commune, and others.

== Publications ==
e-flux publications began in 2008 with the first issue of e-flux journal, edited by Julieta Aranda, Brian Kuan Wood and Anton Vidokle. The publishing platform has since expanded to include a joint imprint with Sternberg Press. Select issues of the journal and reader are marked by public events and projects initiated by the editorial collective, including SUPERCOMMUNITY, an editorial project by e-flux journal commissioned by Okwui Enwezor for the 56th Venice Biennale.

e-flux journal celebrated its 10-year anniversary in 2019 with a series of conferences held in Rotterdam, Paris, Berlin, and New York.

== Conversations ==
In 2014, e-flux launched e-flux conversations, "a new platform for in-depth discussions of artistic and social ideas." The shifting team of editorial contributors includes artists, philosophers, journalists, gardeners, documentarians, designers, architects, politicians, and conspiracy theorists. In a telephone interview with Andrew Russeth for ARTnews, Editor/Moderator of e-flux conversations Karen Archey said: "It’s a very experimental platform, and it really came out of us being avid social media users and wanting to talk about art… There are also no archiving tools for conversations about art on Facebook, which actually sometimes are extremely important." She cited the 2014 debate over Donelle Woolford as one prime example. "There’s no way we can get that back now," she said.

Select conversations have featured Hito Steyerl, Mary Walling Blackburn, Coco Fusco, and Charles Esche.

== Podcast ==
Since 2018, e-flux has published a bi-monthly podcast. Episodes have featured artists and writers including McKenzie Wark, Elizabeth Povinelli, Masha Gessen, Eva Díaz, Simone White, Kader Attia, Franco Berardi, and The Wooster Group, among others.
