= Balashov (surname) =

Balashov (masculine, Russian: Балашов) or Balashova (feminine, Russian: Балашова) is a Russian surname. Notable people with the surname include:

- Alexander Balashov (1770–1837), Russian general and statesman
- Alexandra Balashova (1887–1979), Russian ballet dancer
- Andrey Balashov (1946–2009), Russian sailor
- Boris Balashov (1927–1974), Russian magazine editor
- Hennadiy Balashov (1961–2025), Ukrainian businessman and politician
- Roman Balashov (born 1977), Russian water polo player
- Sasha Balashov (born 1960), Russian historian and art critic
- Victor Balashov (1924–2021), Russian radio and television presenter
- Vitaliy Balashov (born 1991), Ukrainian football player
- Yuri Balashov (born 1949), Russian chess player
