= Archey =

Archey is a surname. Notable people with the surname include:

- Gilbert Archey (1890–1974), New Zealand zoologist, ethnologist, and museum director
- Jimmy Archey (1902–1967), American jazz trombonist
- Karen Archey, American art critic and curator
- Lamon Archey (born 1981), American model and actor
