= Supercommunity =

- Categories: Editorial Project
- First issue: 2015; 11 years ago
- Language: English
- Website: http://supercommunity.e-flux.com/

SUPERCOMMUNITY is an editorial project by e-flux journal commissioned for the 56th Venice Biennale and supported by Wuhan Art Terminus (WH.A.T.), Remai Modern Art Gallery of Saskatchewan, and Microclima. Since launching on May 5, 2015, texts are published Tuesday–Sunday at the Biennale and on the supercommunity online platform. All the World's Futures, the 2015 Venice Biennale was curated by Okwui Enwezor.

== Profile and events ==
On May 8 Julieta Aranda, Natasha Ginwala, Brian Kuan Wood, and Anton Vidokle presented the opening event for the supercommunity at the Arena in the Central Pavilion in the Giardini in Venice. In the first text and editorial the supercommunity is defined:

Having no body and no name is a small price to pay for being wild, for being free to move across (some) countries, (some) political boundaries, (some) historical ideologies, and (some) economies. I am the supercommunity, and you are only starting to recognize me. I grew out of something that used to be humanity. Some have compared me to angry crowds in public squares; others compare me to wind and atmosphere, or to software. Some say they have seen me moving through jet-lagged artists and curators, or migrant laborers, or a lost cargo ship that left a trail of rubber ducks that will wash up on the shores of the planet over the next 200 years. I convert care to cruelty, and cruelty back to care. I convert political desires to economic flows and data, and then I convert them back again. I convert revolutions to revelations. I don’t want security, I want to leave, and then disperse myself everywhere and all the time.

Every Tuesday through Saturday, one text from the project is presented in abbreviated form on a billboard located near the entrance to the main exhibition. The supercommunity kiosk in the Serra Dei Giardini also provides back issues of e-flux journal for visitors at the Biennale. Contributions include "poetry, short fiction, plays and screenplays, as well as other epistolary forms." The full version of each supercommunity text is published on the project website designed by Remco van Bladel. Texts are organized according to the following thematics: SUPERCOMMUNITY, CORRUPTION ... EVERYBODY KNOWS, COSMOS, PLANETARY COMPUTING, APOCALYPSIS, POLITICS OF SHINE, THE ART OF WORK, “ART,” THE SOCIAL COMMONS: CITIZENS IN THE SHADE, ALIENS IN THE SUN, and CUBA: THE FADING OF A SUBCONTINENTAL DREAM.

With every text published by the supercommunity, e-flux conversations hosts responses, moderated discussions, and debate by Mohammad Salemy, Jason Adams, Tony Yanick, and other members of the New Centre for Research and Practice. This response, moderated discussion, and debate is hosted on e-flux conversations. In addition Wuhan Art Terminus (WH.A.T.) publishes selected, translated texts in Chinese on the WH.A.T. TEXT online platform and Remai Modern, Saskatchewan posts supercommunity texts on a portion of their gallery's website dedicated to the project.

== Notable contributors ==
Many notable anthropologists, artists, philosophers, poets, theorists, writers contribute to the supercommunity platform. In addition to those already noted these include: Allora & Calzadilla, Benjamin Bratton, Luis Camnitzer, Ted Chiang, Douglas Coupland, Jimmie Durham, Harun Farocki, Coco Fusco, Boris Groys, Tom Holert, Karl Holmqvist, Adrian Lahoud, Pedro Neves Marques, Ahmet Ögüt, Ana Teixeira Pinto, Elizabeth A. Povinelli, Raqs Media Collective Martha Rosler, Jan Verwoert, Working Artists and the Greater Economy (W.A.G.E.), Ala Younis and Arseny Zhilyaev.

== See also ==
- Venice Biennale
- e-flux
- e-flux publications
- Accelerationism
- Julieta Aranda
- Anton Vidokle
