= Balashov =

Balashov (masculine) or Balashova (feminine) may refer to:

- Balashov (town), in Saratov Oblast, Russia
- Balashov Urban Settlement, a municipal formation which Balashov Town Under Oblast Jurisdiction in Saratov Oblast, Russia is incorporated as
- Balashov (air base), an airbase in Saratov Oblast, Russia
- Balashov (surname) (Balashova), Russian last name
