= Association of German Architects =

German architectural organization

- Established: 21 June 1903 (122 years ago)
- Founded at: Frankfurt
- Legal status: registered association
- Country: Germany
- Membership: 5,000 (2017)
- Website: www.bda-architekten.de

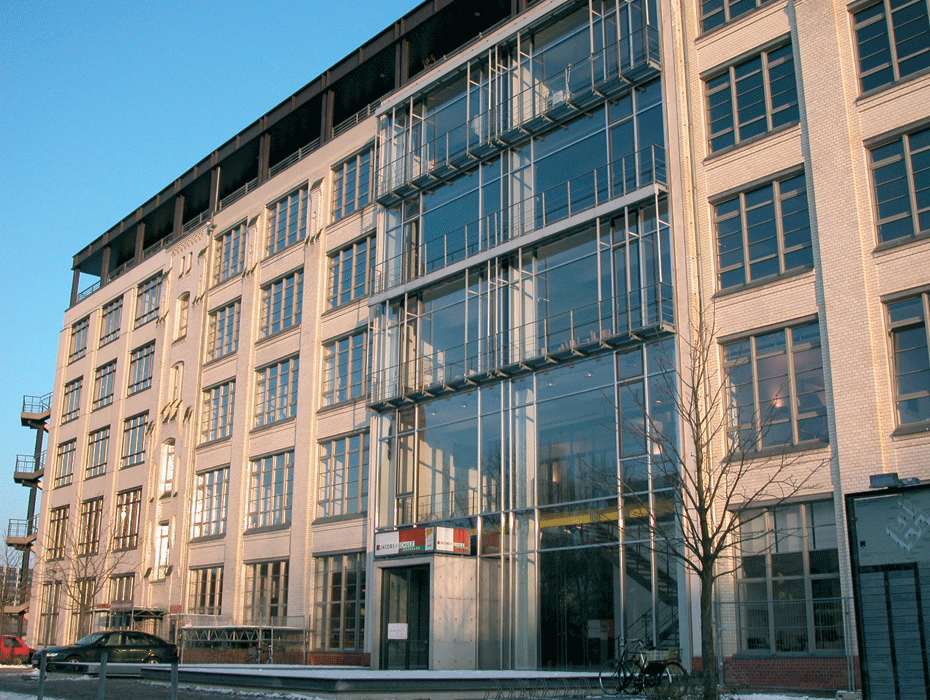
German Architecture Centre, Berlin

The Association of German Architects (German: Bund Deutscher Architekten, BDA) is an association of architects founded in 1903 in Germany. It publishes the bimonthly magazine der architekt. The BDA has over 5,000 members. In 1995, it founded the German Architecture Centre DAZ (current director Matthias Böttger) in Berlin.

== History ==
The association was founded on 21 June 1903 in Frankfurt am Main to protect the interests of freelance architects against real estate speculators and building contractors and to promote the quality of architecture. In addition, the statute stipulated a strict separation between architectural design work and commercial activity. The BDA was initially based in Hanover, since the Hanover Architectural Association provided the initial impetus for its founding, and the local architect Albrecht Haupt held the office of chairman in the early years. The entry in the register of associations also took place in Hanover on 16 September 1907.

Within a few years, the BDA became the most important representative of the interests of independent architects in many regions of Germany. Within its framework, numerous reform architects came together who, in addition to the Deutscher Werkbund, had a major influence on the development of modernism in Germany.

In 1919 the previous BDA, the Deutsche Freie Architektenschaft (DFA) and the Deutsche Architektenschaft (DA) decided to merge to form the new BDA. At the time of its first general meeting in June 1920 in Würzburg, the new BDA had around 2,500 members.

From 1927, during the presidency of Wilhelm Kreis, initially conflicting, more conservative and more progressive architects closed ranks, which was reflected in groundbreaking congresses on the rationalization and optimization of residential buildings.

In 1934, under the presidency of Eugen Hönig, the Association of German Architects was brought into line with the state-supporting professional representation of the architectural profession, namely as a specialist group within the Reich Chamber of Fine Arts, which in turn was a sub-organization of the Reich Chamber of Culture. The loss of organizational independence actually meant the dissolution of the BDA.

In 1948, the BDA was re-established, first in individual states, then throughout the Federal Republic, with the significant participation of architects such as Eugen Fabricius and others who had been BDA members before 1933. Bonn became the new seat. In 1952, as a result of the division of Germany, the Association of German Architects in the GDR was established with its headquarters in East Berlin.

During the presidency of Otto Bartning (1950–1959), the BDA achieved great political influence in the early years of the Federal Republic. During this period, the BDA and the GDR association were admitted to the UIA (Union Internationale des architectes), which was seen as a further step in Germany's return to the community of nations.

In 1969, with the founding of the Federal Chamber of Architects, one of the BDA's main objectives was achieved. The association's crisis of meaning was resolved by a new statute passed in 1972, which formulated "planning and building as a responsibility towards society" as the highest goal of the federal government. In the work of the federal government, there are still overlaps in content with the Federal Chamber of Architects and the State Chambers of Architects, in which employed architects are also organized.

In the course of the accession of the countries of the former GDR to the Federal Republic, the Association of Architects of the GDR (BdA/GDR) dissolved in 1990. As a result, state associations of the BDA were founded in the new federal states. In 1999 the association moved its national office from Bonn to Berlin. At the end of 2020, the BDA Federal Association was renamed the "Association of German Architects BDA".

== Organisation ==
According to their own statements, the state associations currently have around 5,000 members (as of June 2017). The federal office is located in Berlin-Mitte in the German Architecture Center. Acting President is Susanne Wartzeck. The association is present in 16 state associations with regional and urban subgroups in the federal states, regions, municipalities and cities. The regional reference is intended to guarantee that the necessary critical discussion of the construction process can be conducted up-to-date and by well-informed experts.

== Current Occupation ==
The association is the publisher of the magazine "Die Architect", which uses an interdisciplinary approach to address important issues relating to the fundamentals of architecture and building culture. The association is also the sponsor of the German Architecture Center DAZ (artistic director: Matthias Böttger) in Berlin, which presents current trends in architecture and urban planning with exhibitions and accompanying events. The BDA conveys its concerns at the federal level with the annual events "Berlin Talk" and "BDA Day" as well as through numerous other events on current topics, through statements and publications

== Awards ==
The federal association awards the Großer BDA Preis (BDA Grand Award), the BDA Prize for Architectural Criticism and the BDA Nike Architecture Prize in alternating years. In cooperation with the Association of Polish Architects SARP, the bilateral BDA-SARP-Award is awarded to graduates in the field of architecture at German and Polish universities. The German Builders' Prize is awarded by the German Association of Cities, the Association of German Architects and the Federal Association of German Housing and Real Estate Companies. As a cooperation partner, the BDA Federal Association accompanies other architecture prizes. The state associations recognize successful architecture at state level and support students and graduates of architecture faculties who are deemed to be particularly qualified with sponsorship awards.

The Berlin State Association also awards its regional prizes every three years. In 2018, architects competed for a prize with a total of 95 buildings. Anyone can also vote online at www.bda-preis-berlin.de. Buildings were proposed in a wide variety of styles, which, above all, also fit in well with existing buildings or with the environment. These include, for example, the Paragon apartment building on Danziger Strasse, a residential building on stilts that was created from a former water police station in Schöneweide on the Spree, the new Kopernikus school building on Steglitzer Lepsiusstrasse or the house FRIZZ 23 on Friedrichstrasse, a commercial building from model assemblies.

== See also ==
- Architecture of Germany
- List of professional architecture organizations
