= Zdenka Badovinac =

Slovenian writer, museum director and curator

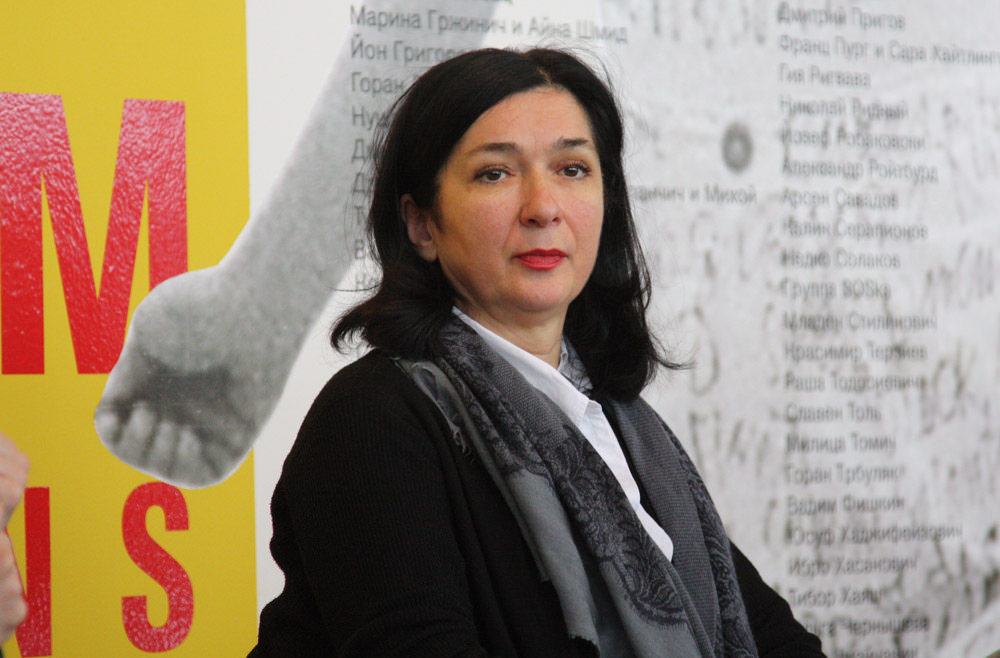
- Badovinac in 2015
- Born: 1958 (age 67–68)
- Occupations: Museum director and curator

Zdenka Badovinac (born 1958) is a curator and writer, was the director of the Museum of Contemporary Art Zagreb, Croatia. She served between 1993 and 2021 as director of the Museum of Modern Art in Ljubljana, comprised since 2011 of two locations: the Museum of Modern Art and the Metelkova Museum of Contemporary Art in Metelkova, an autonomous art, culture, and social center in Ljubljana. In 2022, she was appointed director of the Museum of Contemporary Art in Zagreb. She resigned from her position in autumn 2023 for personal reasons. She returned to Ljubljana, where she currently works as an independent curator, author and international consultant.

== Life ==
Badovinac was born in 1958.

== Career ==
Badovinac is mostly associated with her long tenure at the Museum of Modern Art in Ljubljana, which she directed from 1993 until 2020. Her vigorous curatorial leadership turned the museum into one of Europe's most relevant institutions, generating a dialogue linking the avant-garde traditions with contemporary practices, and promoting a new and complex geopolitical approach to Slovenian art. In December 2020 she was forced to leave by Slovenian's new conservative government.

Badovinac has curated numerous exhibitions presenting both Slovenian and international artists. She initiated the first collection of Eastern European art, Moderna galerija's 2000+ Arteast Collection. In her work, Badovinac addresses the processes of redefining history with the questions of different avant-garde traditions of contemporary art. Furthermore, Badovinac is involved in international dialogue surrounding the geopolitics of art after the fall of communism, believing that museums must face the complex histories of the recent past in conversations about the present. Her recent exhibitions are NSK from Kapital to Capital: Neue Slowenische Kunst – The Event of the Final Decade of Yugoslavia, Moderna galerija, 2015 (Traveled to Van Abbe Museum, Eindhoven, (2016), Garage Museum of Contemporary Art, Moscow (2016) and the Museo Reina Sofía Madrid (2017)); NSK State Pavilion, 5tth Venice Biennale, 2017, co-curated with Charles Esche; The Heritage of 1989. Case Study: The Second Yugoslav Documents Exhibition, Modena galerija, Ljubljana, 2017, co-curated with Bojana Piškur; Sites of Sustainability Pavilions, Manifestos and Crypts, Hello World. Revising a Collection, Hamburger Bahnhof – Museum für Gegenwart – Berlin, 2017; Heavenly Beings: Neither Human nor Animal, Museum of Contemporary Art Metelkova, Ljubljana, co-curated with Bojan Piškur, 2018; Bigger Than Myself: Heroic Voices from Ex-Yugoslavia, MAXXI, Rome. (2020); Sanja Iveković, Works of Heart (1974-2022), Kunsthalle, Vienna, (2022).

Badovinac was Slovenian Commissioner at the Venice Biennale (1993–1997, 2005).

Badovinac was Austrian Commissioner at the São Paulo Biennial in 2002. She worked with the art group monochrom who created an elaborate hoax featuring Georg Paul Thomann. Badovinac discusses her role in the project in a short documentary film called "The Thomann In(ter)vention", created by Hadas Emma Kedar.

Badovinac was a board member of The International Committee for Museums and Collections of Modern Art from 2005 to 2010 and president from 2011 to 2013. She is a founding member of L'Internationale, the European confederation of contemporary art museums.

In 2017, Badovinac served on the jury that chose Agnieszka Polska as winner of the Preis der Nationalgalerie.

In early 2022 it was announced her appointment as Director of the MSU Museum of Contemporary Art of Zagreb, in Croatia.

=== Curated shows ===
==== 2000s ====
Badovinac's first exhibition, Body and the East – From the 1960s to the Present, was staged in 1998 at Moderna galerija, Ljubljana. The exhibit then traveled to Exit Art, New York in 2001. She continued in 2000 with the first public displaying of the 2000+ Arteast Collection: The Art of Eastern Europe in Dialogue with the West at Moderna galerija. In 2003, Badovinac completed a series of Arteast Exhibitions, mostly at Moderna galerija. In 2004, Badovinac co-curated 7 Sins: Ljubljana-Moscow with Victor Misiano and Igor Zabel. In 2006, she worked on Interrupted Histories and Arteast Collection 2000+23. In 2008, Galerija Škuc, Ljubljana, Badovinac was part of the Hosting Moderna galerija! project. Also in 2008, Old Masters (2008) Zavod P.A.R.A.S.I.T.E., Center in galerijaP74, Ljubljana, also part of the Hosting Moderna galerija! project!

==== 2010s ====
In the next decade, Badovinac helped curate Museum of Parallel Narratives: In the Framework of L’Internationale at MACBA, Barcelona, 2011. L'Internationale is an international and cross-institutional organization created in 2009 to foster discussion between institutions whose collections focus on local histories and narratives. The organization takes their name from the left-wing anthem "The International." MACBA's exhibit presented Ljubljana's Moderna galerija's Arteast 2000+ Collection, the foremost and seminal collection of post-war avant-garde Eastern European art.

=== Other major projects ===
Badovinac's other major projects include:

- 2000: unlimited.nl-3, DeAppel, Amsterdam
- 2002: (un)gemalt, Sammlung Essl, Kunst der Gegenwart, Klosterneuburg/Vienna
- 2004: Imagine Limerick, Open&Invited, different exhibition venues, Limerick
- 2005: Democracies/the Tirana Biennale, Tirana
- 2008: The Schengen Women. Badovinac's text where she discusses European identity as it relates to gender and space
- 2016: "Art as a Parallel Cultural Infrastructure / Legacy of Post War Avantgardes from Former Yugoslavia" lecture at Haus der Kunst in Munich.

== Publications ==
- Museums beyond the Crises: CIMAM 2012 Annual Conference Publication, edited by Zdenka Badovinac, Bartomeu Marí
- Comradeship: Curating, Art, and Politics in Post-socialist Europe, Zdenka Badovinac in conversation with Ana Janevski. (published by E-flux publications).
