= Karen Archey =

American art critic and curator

- Education: The School of the Art Institute of Chicago
- Occupations: Curator, writer
- Notable work: Art Post-Internet (2014); After Institutions (2022)
- Website: www.karenarchey.com

Karen Archey is an American art critic and curator based in New York City and Amsterdam. She is the Curator of Contemporary Art and Time-Based Media at Stedelijk Museum in Amsterdam, and the former editor of e-flux.

Archey regularly speaks on issues related to contemporary art, feminism, and technology at venues such as the Museum of Modern Art in New York City and the Institute of Contemporary Arts in London. She has written for publications such as Art in America, ArtReview, frieze, and Spike Art Quarterly, and she has contributed essays to publications of the Whitney Museum of American Art, New York and New Museum of Contemporary Art, New York.

== Biography ==
Archey received a Bachelor of Fine Arts in Visual and Critical Studies in 2008 from The School of the Art Institute of Chicago.

Archey was the Curator-in-Residence at the Abrons Arts Center in New York from 2012 to 2013. She also served as the Editor-at-Large of Rhizome at the New Museum of Contemporary Art, New York. She contributed the essay Bodies in Space: Gender and Sexuality in the Online Public Sphere to the 2015 publication Mass Effect: Art and the Internet in the Twenty-First Century, co-published by the MIT Press and New Museum as part of the series Critical Anthologies in Art and Culture.

In 2014 in Beijing, Archey co-curated the survey exhibition Art Post-Internet at Ullens Center for Contemporary Art with Robin Peckham and edited the freely available publication Art Post-internet: Information/Data. Trevor Smith of Hyperallergic wrote that Archey and Peckham's exhibition and catalog "solidified the term “post-internet art” in our vocabulary". Archey and Peckham describe Internet art as: "post-Internet refers not to a time ‘after’ the Internet but rather to an Internet state of mind — to think in the fashion of the network.” They go on to write in the catalogue:

"Our current historical moment has been postulated as the dawn of the posthuman, at least in the cultural imaginary. Since the advent of the internet, theorists of new media have described the emergent possibilities of a distributed global unconscious, a "next nature" that evolves alongside human society, or an "anthropocene" geological era defined by the human accumulation of carbon. In all of these narratives, what matters is the back-and-forth relationship between ecology and the human. As our bodies are extended and perhaps supplanted by prosthetic devices that mediate our experiences of the world, new forms of being — once known as science fiction — come alive in very real, often prosaic ways."

Archey joined e-flux in 2014. While editor at e-flux, she began the web publishing platform Conversations. She remained the editor of Conversations until 2017.

She has contributed reviews to numerous contemporary arts publications, such as ArtReview and Art-Agenda. In 2015, Archey received a Creative Capital grant from the Andy Warhol Foundation for the Visual Arts for short-form writing.

In 2017, Archey was appointed the Curator of Contemporary Art for Time-Based Media of Stedelijk Museum.

Archey founded Women, Inc. a group that supports women in the arts at the early stages of their careers.

== Exhibitions ==
- Images Rendered Bare. Vacant. Recognizable, Stadium, New York City, 2012
- Bcc #7, Stadium, New York City, 2012
- Deleuze & Co., Stadium, New York City, 2012
- How to Eclipse the Light, Wilkinson, London, 2012
- Deep Spaces (Insides), Joe Sheftel Gallery, New York City, 2012
- Harm van den Dorpel, Abrons Art Center, New York City, 2013
- Hymns for Mr. Suzuki, Abrons Art Center, New York City, 2013
- Art Post-Internet, Ullens Center for Contemporary Art, Beijing, China, 2014
- Sharing Love, Institute of Contemporary Art at Maine College of Art, Portland, 2016

== Selected writings ==
- Hack Life, Art Papers, November/December 2013
- "Hyper-Elasticity Symptoms, Signs Treatment: On Hito Steyerl's Liquidity Inc." within Too Much World: The Films of Hito Steyerl, edited by Nick Aikens; Sternberg Press, Van Abbemuseum and Institute of Modern Art, 2014
- Art Post-Internet: Information/Data, edited with Robin Peckham, 2014
- Bodies in Space: Gender and Sexuality in the Online Public Sphere, within Mass Effect: Art and the Internet in the Twenty-First Century, edited by Lauren Cornell and Ed Halter; MIT Press and New Museum, 2015
- Embodied Differences: New Images of the Monstrous and Cyborg in Contemporary Art, within Dreamlands: Immersive Cinema and Art, 1905–2016, edited by Chrissie Isles; Whitney Museum of American Art, 2016
- Archey, Karen; Metahaven, eds. (2018). Metahaven, PSYOP. Köln: König, Walther. ISBN 9783960983620.
- Archey, Karen (2022). After Institutions. Floating Opera Press. ISBN 9783981910889.
