= Sasha Balashov =

Russian historian of soviet painting art

Alexander V. Balashov
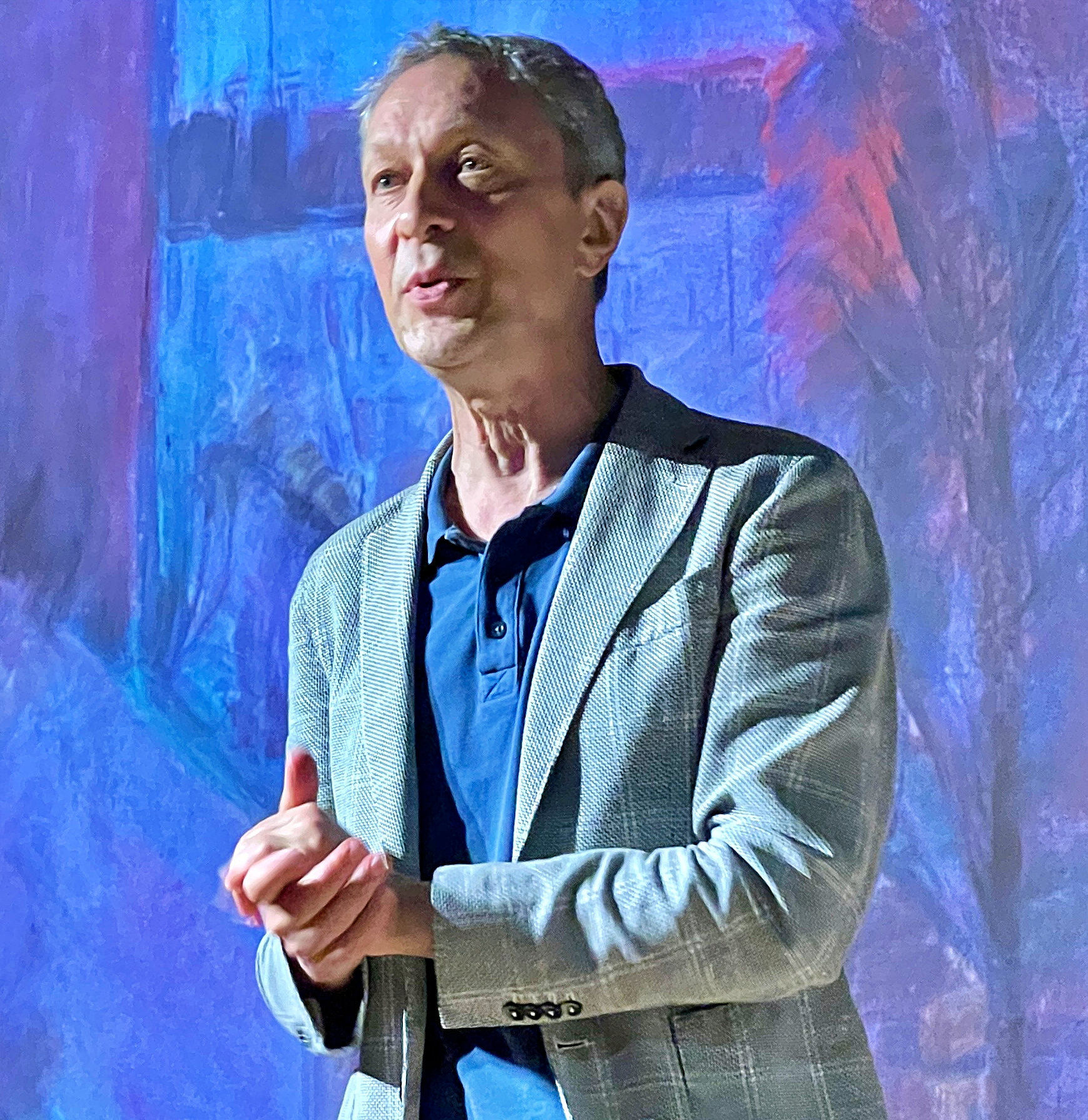
- Sasha Balashov at a lecture in 2024
- Born: 1960 (age 65–66); Moscow, USSR
- Education: Damascus University, Moscow State University
- Known for: Russian painting art study 1910-1940
- Scientific career
- Fields: History of Art; Art critic

Sasha Balashov (Alexander Vladimirovich Balashov; Russian: Саша Балашов) ― Russian historian of painting art, art critic and theorist of contemporary art, he is an expert on museum and exhibition collections of Soviet paintings, a lecturer and curator of art projects and painting collections. He is also known as a collector, the author of articles, books and art albums. He specializes in the field of Russian art of the twentieth century. Balashov is the curator of the painting collection of "UniCredit Bank" in Moscow.

== Biography ==
Sasha Balashov was born in 1960 in Moscow.

He graduated from Moscow State University (Institute of Asian and African Countries), where he specialized in the history of Eastern culture. Balashov also studied at Damascus University. He currently resides in Moscow, Russia.

== Career ==
Since 2004, he is the author of books in the "New History of Art" series published by “Agey Tomesh” under the program of publishing materials covering little-known pages in the history of Russian art of the 20th century.

In 1990-1992, he worked for the "Creativity" magazine as the editor-in-chief of the almanac “Art Subject”. He was a member of the editorial board of the Art Journal (Moscow, Russia).

Balashov is a curator of a number of exhibitions and corporate meetings (International Moscow Bank → UniCredit Bank), including the Moscow Forum of Art Initiatives (1997).

Since 2010, he has been the host of the website of the publishing program “New History of Art” — Arteology.

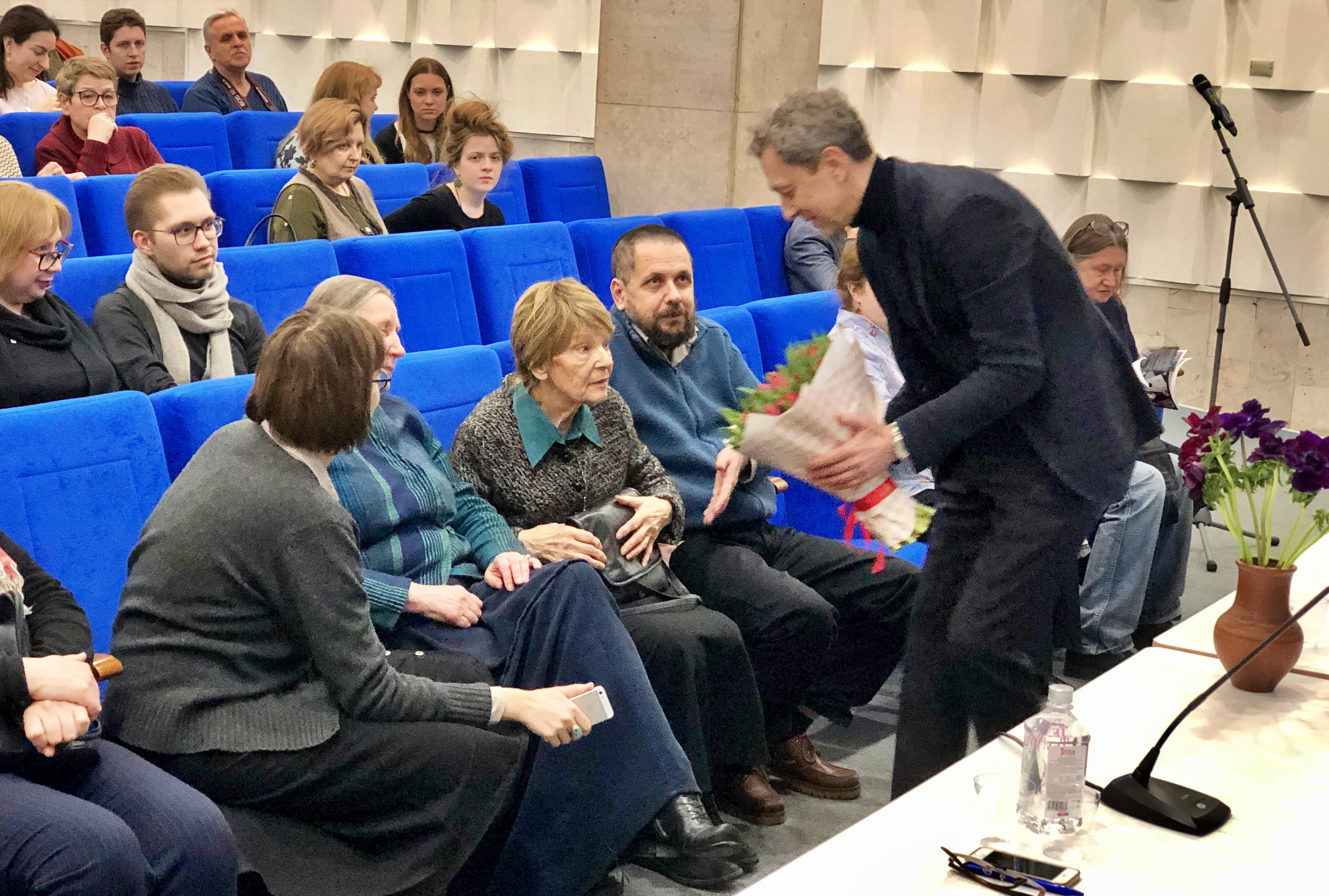
At the memorial evening of Sergey Romanovich, 2020

In 2018-2020, he taught at the Higher School of Economics School of Design. He is also the author of the course: “Russian Art of the 20th Century between the Avant-garde and Postmodernism” (36 lectures).

Since 2023, he has been a member of the editorial board of the serial publication: Higher School of Economics University Journal of Art & Design (HSE University Journal of Art & Design).

In 2024, he was a scientific consultant for the exhibition of paintings by Alexander Labas "Weightlessness".

Since 2024, Balashov began his own course of lectures at the Moscow Voznesensky Center on the topic "Russian Art of the 1920s - 1930s as an Experience of World Creation. A Generation of Artists of the Twentieth Century's Peers: from the 1920s to the 1960s", where he tries to answer the questions: How relevant and valuable is the art of the 1920s? Why do we look so closely today at works of art that are turning 100 years old? Why do we study architecture, drama, read novels and poems, watch photographs and films from the 1920s and 1930s with a special interest? Maybe in this art we find something that postmodern or modern culture have lost? And who are they - the main characters of the art of that time? What is this phenomenon? What are its origins, main features and how significant is it in the history of national and world culture? Maybe, speaking about the art of the 1920s - 1930s, we are talking not so much about the past, but about the experience of designing the future?

== Research works ==
He is a historian and theorist of modern art. Balashov studies Russian art of the 1920s and 1940s, and artistic associations of the first half of the 20th century. Post-Avant-garde in the USSR (1920-1940) — authors, sources, phenomenon and reflection in life.

Art as a method and source of time assessment for the work of historians and philosophers. Limits of imagination, our time and place.

== Publications ==
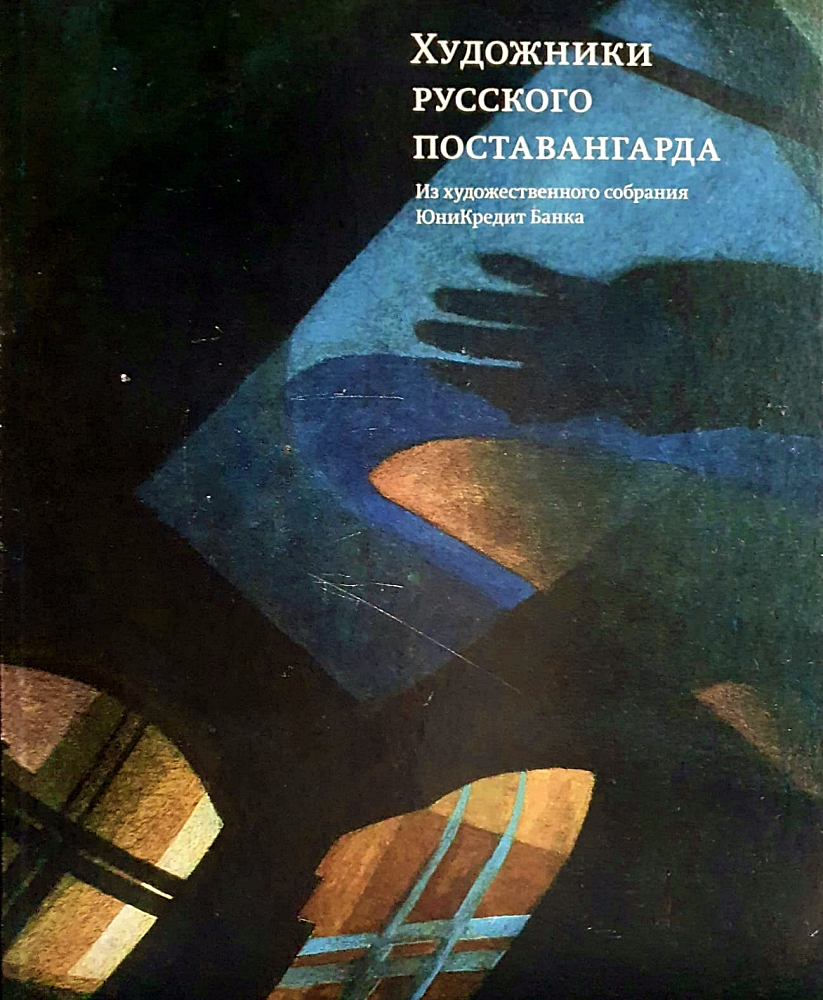
His book about Leonid Chupyatov, 2015

Balashov is an author of art albums and books about artists (most of them in Russian):

- 2005 — Expressionism. Aesthetics of the marginal аrt in Russia in the 20th Century. (Series: New History of Art)
- 2005 — Semenov-Amursky.
- 2006 — Barto
- 2007 — Kamensky
- 2012 — Koroteev
- 2015 — Artists of the Russian Post-Avant-Garde: from the Art Collection of UniCredit Bank. Moscow: Agey Tomesh; WAM. 308 p.
- 2015 — Vladimir Semensky. Painting, 2010-2015 / Petrovichev A., Balashov A. 104 p. (New History of Art)
- 2016 — Georgy Shchetinin. Moscow: Arteology. 304 p.
- 2018 — Schultz : Arseny Schultz. Catalog-album. Moscow: Arteology. 248 p. (and the project: Artist Arseny Schultz. Little-known art of the early 20th century.)
- 2022 — Zusman. Moscow: Arteology (August Borg). 288 p. ISBN 978-5-906999-86-3. — a book about the works of the artist L. P. Zusman.

Balashov is the author of papers, essays and art reviews, including:

- Articles in Art Magazine (1993-1998)
- Balashov A. In the Face of Time // Academia. 2010. No. 1. P. 96-100.
- Balashov A. The Path of Painting // Academia. 2010. No. 2. P. 99-102.
- Balashov A. The Open Set of Alexey Kamensky // Dialogue of Arts. 2011. No. 1. P. 92-97.
- Balashov A. Outside the Zone of Recognition: [100th Anniversary of the Birth of Arseny Leonidovich Schulz] // Dialogue of Arts. 2012. No. 1. P. 86-93.
- Balashov A. Pencil, Space, Light: [on the exhibition of works by V. Favorsky, A. Bill, A. Livanov, O. Burykina, O. Iordan, D. Filatov and others] // Dialogue of Arts. 2012. No. 1. P. 134-135.
- Balashov A. People and the City: [on the exhibition from the collection of the Unicredit group at the Winzavod Contemporary Art Center] // Dialogue of Arts. 2012. No. 1. P. 124-126.
- Balashov A. Travels of the Winged: [Georgy Shchetinin is a book artist, industrial graphics master, teacher] // Dialogue of Arts. 2012. No. 2. Pp. 82-87.
- Balashov A. Allegoria Sacra, or Coma of Culture: [On the occasion of the exhibition at the Triumph Gallery] // Dialogue of Arts. 2012. No. 2. Pp. 116-119.
- Balashov A. Avant-garde — a national resource? // Dialogue of Arts. 2014. No. 4. Pp. 68-71.
- Balashov A. Corporate collection as personal experience // Russian art. 2014. No. 3. Pp. 36-45.
- Alexander Balashov: Finding polyphony: [interview with L. Kovalenko about assembling a collection at UniCredit Bank] // Banks and the business world. 2016. February 9.
- Balashov A. Georgy Shchetinin: A different language sounds there // Dialogue of Arts. 2016. No. 1/2. pp. 146-153.
- Balashov A. Yuri Savelievich Zlotnikov. Direct speech // Dialogue of Arts. 2016. No. 4. P. 106-113.
- Balashov A. Mikhail Sokolov's Graphic Cycles of the 1910s-1920s // Mikhail Sokolov. Vol. 1. Graphics. Easel Works. Moscow: 2K, 2018.
- Balashov A. The Return of Painting // Antonina Sofronova. Vol. 1. Painting. Moscow: ModernArtConsulting, 2020.
- Balashov A. Another Present // Dialogue of Arts. 2021. No. 1. Pp. 78-85.
- Balashov A. What's in a Name? 20th Century: An Unfinished Project // Tramway of Arts, 2021.
- Balashov A. "If we talk about the "great Silver Age", for me it is the peak of civilization" // Art News. No. 117. 2024.
- Balashov A. The Man Who Wanted to Create the World: for the exhibition "Weightlessness. Alexander Labas on Speed, Progress and Love." Moscow: New Jerusalem Museum, 2024.

== Lectures ==
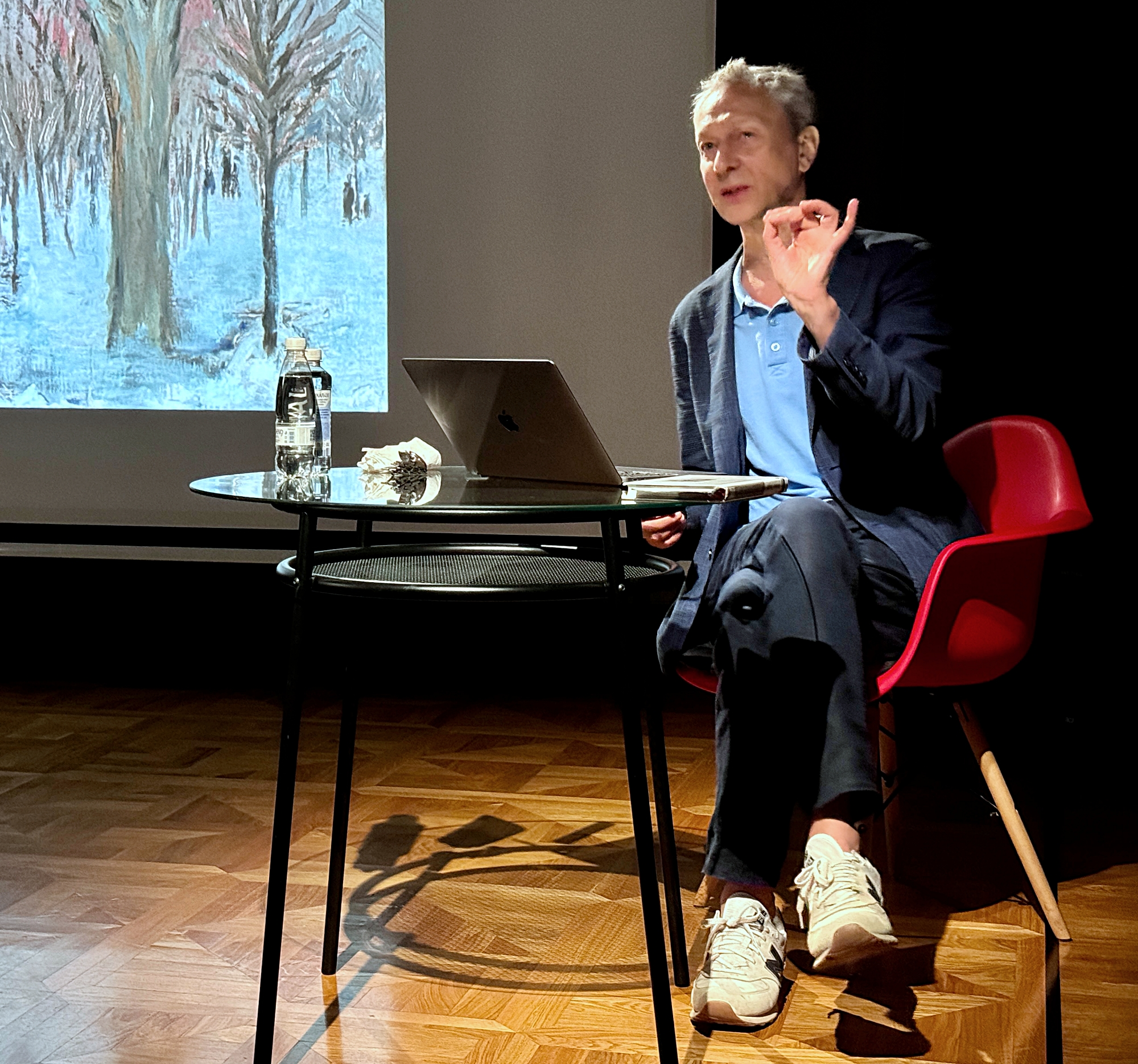
Lecture, 2024

Host of thematic author's lectures, educational and scientific seminars, including:

- 2010 — Lecture course "Russian art of the 20th century: unknown history".
- 2012 — Lecture on the little-known association of artists "Fire-Color".
- 2016 — Interview: Finding polyphony, Banks and the business world.
- 2021 — First student interdisciplinary debates “Law influences art vs. Art influences law”
- 2022 — Art and Time (Higher School of Economics) — art as a picture of the future world. The experience of Russian art of the twentieth century and the formation of a picture of the world. Soviet art of the Avant-garde and after the Avant-garde — a prologue and project for the future.
- 2022 — Law and Art
- 2023 — Lecture-tour of the exhibition "Dreamer's Walk". About the difficult life of Fyodor Semenov-Amursky, his work and the influence of the French school, his studies at VKHUTEMAS and much more.
- 2024 — Interview: “If we talk about the “great Silver Age”, for me it is the peak of civilization”, The Art Newspaper Russia.
- 2024 — “Post-Avant-Garde — Art of the Future” — lecture at the New Jerusalem Museum
- 2024—2025 — Open lectures at the Moscow Voznesensky Center on Russian artists of the 1920s — 1930s, the lecture “Women and the Female View of the World in the Art of the 1920s” was the most successful:

Introduction to the problems of Post-Avant-garde

- Polyphonic art of the 1920s: a history with many unknowns and a generation of peers of the century. Faces and voices of the time. Artistic associations of the 1920s. Avant-garde and Post-Avant-garde. The Great Silver Age.
- Painting and Metaphysics: Russian Cosmism in the Art of the 1920s and Its Transformation in the 1960s. The Society of Artists and Poets "Makovets". Vasily Chekrygin and the Philosophy of the Common Cause of Nikolai Fyodorov. Sergei Romanovich: Art after Larionov.
- Painting between Aestheticism and Existence: The Romantic Passeism of Mikhail Sokolov. Art Criticism in the 1920s and the Problem of Describing Post-Avant-garde Art. Antonina Sofronova and "Group 13". Anatoly Shugrin and the logic of painting in the 20th century: resurrection through non-objectivity.
- The artist's biography as a metaphor for time: art of the 1920s as a space for research and discovery. Arseny Shulz, his drawings of 1928-1932 and M. A. Bulgakov's novel The Master and Margarita.

The Paths of Russian Cosmism in the Art of the Twentieth Century

- Art on the Other Side of History: Three Exhibitions of the Path of Painting Association. Lev Zhegin and His Students. Tatiana Aleksandrova, Grigory Kostyukhin. Vasily Korotyevv: Painting as Rhythm, Space, and Meditation:
- Artist and Book. Georgy Shchetinin: Text, Illustration, Existence. "People from the Backwoods." "Martha and Maria." Black Paintings. Francois Villon. Social Circle.
- "Amaravella." Intuitionism or Art between Cosmism and Hermeticism. The creative path of Pyotr Fateev. Memories of Boris Smirnov-Rusetsky.
- Artists of the same age in the culture of the 1960s. Art of the space age or the art of an adult. Fyodor Semyonov-Amursky, Rostislav Barto

Russian art of the 1920s. Return to the idea of the future

- Art of the 1920s and "socialist realism". OST and AKhRR: a conflict that determined the content of the time.
- Russian art of the 1920s as a territory of research and discovery. New history and new names: Viktor Smirnov, Konstantin Kuznetsov, Andrei Galkin, Fyodor Konstantinov.
- Women and the female view of the world in the art of the 1920s. Alexandra Koltsova-Bychkova, Varvara Bubnova, Magdalina Verigo, Tatyana Mavrina, Alexandra Korsakova, Maria Myslina.
- Soviet art of the 1920s as a project of the future and an alternative to modernity. A view from the 21st century: the problem of understanding and interpretation.
