= Luis Berríos-Negrón =

Puerto Rican artist working in Berlin (born 1971)

- Born: 15 May 1971 (age 55)
- Education: Massachusetts Institute of Technology; Parsons New School for Design
- Occupation: Artist
- Known for: ssculpture and installation, in public and environmental art

Luis Berríos-Negrón (born 15 May 1971 in San Juan, Puerto Rico) is a Puerto Rican artist working with sculpture and installation, in public and environmental art.

He has an independent practice, as well as is the founder of the Anxious Prop art collective and the Paramodular environmental design group. Berríos-Negrón lives and works in Berlin, Germany, since 2006.

== Education ==
He currently is candidate for doctor of philosophy at the Konstfack College of the Arts and the Royal Institute of Technology (KTH) in Stockholm. He holds a Master of Architecture from the Massachusetts Institute of Technology (M.I.T.) and a Bachelor of Fine Arts from the Parsons New School for Design.

While at the New School, he was teaching assistant to urban ecologist Jean Gardner, assistant editor/curator to conceptual artist Silvia Kolbowski, and studio assistant to photographer Larry Clark. While at M.I.T., he was teaching assistant to Joan Jonas, Antoni Muntadas and Krzysztof Wodiczko. His master's thesis was co-advised by then Dean of the School of Architecture Adèle Naudé Santos, and director of the Center for Advance Visual Studies, Krzysztof Wodiczko, and was co-read by Mark Jarzombek, Nader Tehrani, and William J. Mitchell, then head of the M.I.T Media Laboratory.

== Teaching ==
From 2011 to 2013, he was Assistant Professor and Researcher at the Institute for Design and Architecture Strategies at the Architecture, Civil Engineering, and Environmental Sciences Department of Technische Universität Braunschweig. From 2013 to 2014 he was Visiting Lecturer at the University of Münster for Applied Sciences, and now as part of his doctoral candidacy, he is lecturer at Konstfack offering the fine-arts courses “Instance Notation Sensation” (Fall 2015) and “Immediate Archaeologies” (2016–17).

== Exhibitions ==
In 2012, he was core collaborator with Paul Ryan exhibiting in the Threeing project at Documenta 13, and in Ute Meta Bauer's Future Archive at the Neuer Berliner Kunstverein. In 2013, he represented Germany with curator Matthias Böttger in the São Paulo International Biennial for Architecture, and was in residence at the Zürcher Hochschule der Künste. In 2014 he was commissioned artist in the 3rd Biennial of Art of Bahia, and in 2015 he showed in Remote Control 2 at Lothringer 13 Kunsthalle in Munich, and was commissioned artist for Experiment Stockholm at Färgfabriken.

== Awards ==
He has received various awards, including first prize of the Parsons-Kalil Award for Smart Design 2002, first prize of the M.I.T.-Schnitzer Award for the Visual Arts 2004, and most recently the 2013 Royal Danish Council for the Arts International Visiting Artist stipend, and the 2015–19 Art, Technology and Design Doctoral Stipend from the Konstfack & Royal Institute of Technology (KTH).

== "Social pedestals" ==
Berríos-Negrón defines a social pedestal as an art form that looks to make visible the dematerialisation of sculpture. He does not see it as a singular, physical thing, but a time-based form of displaying art that is characterised by multiple types of visible and invisible sculptural objects and experiences. Berríos-Negrón argues that the social pedestal does evolve from the "Social sculpture" in that it also looks to contribute to the understanding of art's potential to shape, structure and transform society and the environment. In that regard, Berríos-Negrón intends his social pedestals to go beyond the body and agency of the artist, aspiring to condition the transformative potential of art by making environments that operate by themselves, without the direct intentionality of the artist. As such, Berríos-Negrón deploys these environments with the intention of facilitating a social experience that is often contemplative and participatory, one that displays affirmative intersections between artistic, curatorial, political, and scientific practices.

Berríos-Negrón argues that these environments rely on objects of collective experience rather than on individual agency. He roots these experiences in the conceptual objects of the "relational circuit" by Paul Ryan, the “boundary object” by Susan Leigh Star and James R. Griesemer, the "epistemic thing" (from the “Experimental System”) by Hans-Jörg Rheinberger, and “abstract machines” as defined by philosopher Gerald Raunig.

Berríos-Negrón states that "most of these works, as temporary, cultural things, abstract or concrete, may simply seem to be either scenographies, recalcitrant props, or semi-functional things. But, when situated, they give manifold, human and non-human access to a more ample social and sensational reality that does not necessarily privilege the visual sense. This mental and sensational architectonic primarily looks to reform temporary space through multidimensional probability, not necessarily as social sculptures, but through social pedestals."

Berríos-Negrón's social pedestals take environmental form as their medium. In parallel to the works of contemporary artists such as Mark Leckey that take the dematerialisation of sculpture as part of the digitalisation of life, in the case of Berríos-Negrón’s work, his temporary works often contend with dematerialisation as part of the geopolitics of climate change or forced migration. These time-based works are conditioned by things that at first glance could be dispassionately thought of as ordinary things, such as ropes, tables, chairs, carpets, book shelves, archives, and so forth. Berríos-Negrón believes that these things only begin to work as social pedestals when activated by collective engagement. As part of his own culture and education, Berríos-Negrón points to Brazilian and Latin American Neo-concrete art and to "transculturation", as well as to North American Interrogative Design and Second-Order Cybernetics.
