= Viktor Balashov =

Soviet announcer (1924–2021)

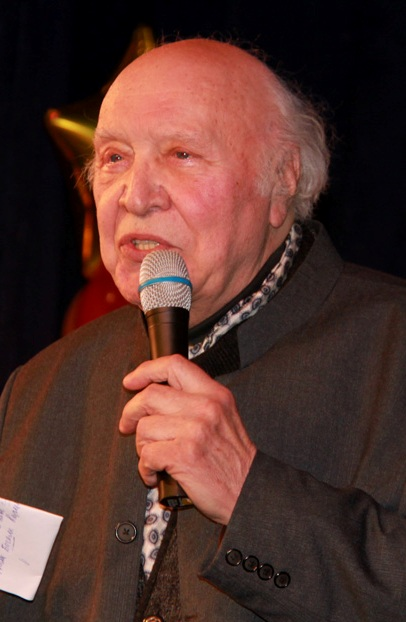
- Born: Viktor Ivanovich Balashov; 24 December 1924; Moscow, Russian SFSR, Soviet Union
- Died: 23 June 2021 (aged 96); Moscow, Russia
- Occupations: TV presenter; journalist; actor; radio host
- Years active: 1944–2021

Viktor Ivanovich Balashov (Russian: Виктор Иванович Балашов; 24 December 1924 – 23 June 2021) was a Soviet and Russian radio and television presenter. He was best known as the host for the USSR Union Radio, from 1944. From 1947 to 1991 he worked for the Soviet Central Television and its Russian successor. In 1997 he was awarded the People's Artist of Russia. Balashov was a veteran of the Second World War and was a member of the Red Army.

Balashov was also the Master of Sports of the USSR in Sambo and coached Anatoly Kharlampiyev. He also performed as a voice actor in documentaries and feature films.

He died on 23 June 2021 at the age of 96.

== Family ==
His first wife, a physician, died when their daughter was two years old.

His daughter, Margarita Viktorovna, is a pensioner.

His granddaughter, Anastasia, lives in France.

He has three great-grandchildren: Alexander (b. 2008), Maksim (b. 2016), and Irina (b. 2011).

His second wife was Nelli Semyonovna Krylova (1927–2014), an actress at the Moscow Operetta Theatre (1948–1985). She died of a stroke.

His son, Viktor Viktorovich Balashov (1964–2024), died in a fire in his apartment.
