= Matthias Böttger =

German architect

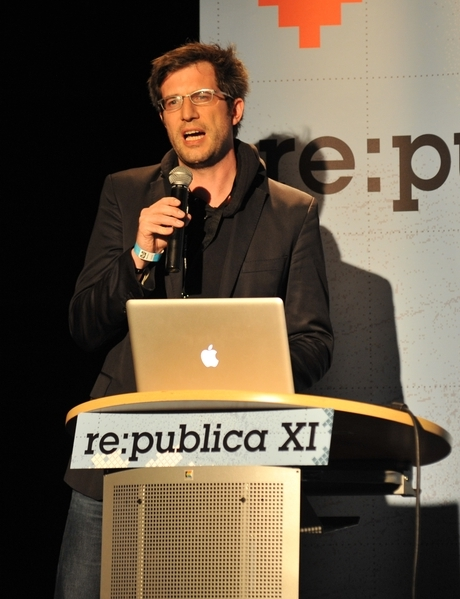
Matthias Böttger, 2011

Matthias Böttger (born February 7, 1974) is a German architect and curator.

Matthias Böttger studied architecture and urban planning at the University of Karlsruhe and the University of Westminster, London. He worked as an architect in Cologne, Berlin and Paris. His scientific activity began at the Bauhaus Dessau Foundation, followed by the University of Stuttgart and the ETH Zurich, where Böttger taught art and architecture.

In 2007–08 he was a visiting professor of art and public space at the Academy of Fine Arts, Nuremberg. From 2012 to 2017, he was Professor for Sustainable Architecture + Future Tactics (SAFT) at Kunstuniversität Linz. Since 2017 he is Professor and Head of the Institute HyperWerk at the Academy of Art and Design of FHNW Basel.

Together with Friedrich von Borries, Matthias Böttger was 2008 the general commissioner and curator for the German contribution "Updating Germany – 100 Projects for a Better Future" to the XI. International Venice Biennale of Architecture. He was a fellow of the Akademie Schloss Solitude in Stuttgart and in 2010 took over the direction of the “aut architektur und tirol”, an Art Association of Architecture in Innsbruck. Since 2011 Matthias Böttger is the artistic director of the German Center of Architecture (DAZ) an initiative of the Association of German Architects (BDA) in Berlin. In 2013 he was the curator for the German contribution "Nos Brasil! We Brazil!" at the X. Bienal de Arquitetura de São Paulo.

== Curatorial activity ==
- 2016: Neue Standards. Zehn Thesen zum Wohnen, DAZ Berlin, KAZ im KuBA Kassel, Neues Museum Nürnberg, ait-Salon Köln, Baukulturzentrum Sachsen, afo Linz, etc.
- 2013: Nós Brasil! We Brazil!, Casa do Povo, a German contribution to the X Bienal de Arquitetura de São Paulo on behalf of the Goethe-Institut and the German Federal Ministry of Transport, Building and Urban Development BMVBS.
- 2012: Why Architecture, German Center for Architecture DAZ, Berlin.
- 2011: Raumproduktion, Seitenlichtsaal, Kunsthalle Düsseldorf.
- 2010: aut.raumproduktion, exhibition series with the conditions of the production of space, aut architektur und tirol, Innsbruck.
- 2009: TV towers. 8,559 Meters of Politics and Architecture, German Architecture Museum (DAM) in Frankfurt.
- 2008: Updating Germany. 100 projects for a better future, German contribution to the Venice Biennale of Architecture, commissioned by the Federal Ministry of Transport, Building and Urban Development BMVBS.
- 2006: Fanshop of Globalization. A traveling exhibition shown in Germany's fan zones during the football World Cup in cooperation with the Federal Agency for Civic Education.

== Writings ==
- with Friedrich von Borries (ed.): Fanshop of Globalisation . Federal Agency for Civic Education, Bonn 2006, ISBN 3-89331-684-1.
- with Friedrich von Borries, Steffen P. Walz (Ed.): Space Time Play – Computergames, Architecture and Urbanism: The Next Level. Birkhäuser, Boston Basel Berlin 2007, ISBN 978-3-7643-8414-2.
- with Friedrich von Borries (ed.): Updating Germany. 100 Projects For a Better Future. Hatje Cantz, Ostfildern -Ruit 2008, ISBN 978-3-7757-2262-9.
- with Friedrich von Borries and Florian Heilmeyer (eds.): Better Future? Searching for the Spaces of Tomorrow. Merve, Berlin 2008, ISBN 978-3-88396-255-9.
- with Friedrich von Borries and Florian Heilmeyer (ed.): TV Towers. 8,559 Meters Politics and Architecture. Jovis, Berlin 2009, ISBN 978-3-86859-024-1.
- with Ludwig Engel and Juliane Otterbach (ed.): Talking futures. A miniature book about utopias and futures. Lost Books, Stuttgart 2010, ISBN 978-0-95676-410-2.
- with Angelika Fitz (ed.): WELTSTADT – Nós Brasil! We Brazil. Goethe Institute, Munich, 2013, ISBN 978-3-939670-93-3.
- with Stefan Carsten and Ludwig Engel, Speculations Transformations – Thoughts on the Future of Germany's Cities and Regions, Zürich 2016, ISBN 978-3-03778-478-5.
- with Olaf Bahner, Neue Standards. Zehn Thesen zum Wohnen, Berlin 2016, ISBN 978-3-86859-454-6.
