= Julieta Aranda =

Mexican artist (born 1975)

- Born: 1975; Mexico City, Mexico
- Education: BFA in filmmaking at School of Visual Arts NYC MFA Columbia University

Julieta Aranda (born in 1975 in Mexico City, Mexico) is a conceptual artist that lives and works in Berlin and New York City. She received a BFA in filmmaking from the School of Visual Arts (2001) and an MFA from Columbia University (2006), both in New York. Her explorations span installation, video, and print media, with a special interest in the creation and manipulation of artistic exchange and the subversion of traditional notions of commerce through art making.

== Biographical timeline ==
- 1975 Born in Mexico City
- 1995–1996 2-year grant from the National Foundation for the Culture and the Arts (FONCA), Mexico
- 1996–1998 Merit scholarship awarded by the School of Visual Arts, (SVA), New York
- 1995–1999 Silas H. Rhodes merit scholarship awarded by the School of Visual Arts, (SVA), New York
- 1996–1999 Merit scholarship for young film-makers awarded by the National Board of Review, New York
- 2001 BFA, School of Visual Arts, New York
- 2002 Production grant from the Gulbenkien Foundation, Portugal
- 2002 Jovenes Creadores, 1 year production grant, Mexico
- 2004 Merit award, Columbia University, New York
- 2005 Curatorial fellowship, Columbia University, New York
- 2005 Member of "The Generals", a new advisory board of Art in General, New York
- 2005 Kantor / Zach Feuer Gallery Curatorial Fellowship, Columbia University, New York
- 2006 MFA, Columbia University School of the Arts, New York
- 2006 UNIDEE in Residence – International Program 2006 (Fondazione Pistoletto) – Biella, Italy
- 2007 IASPIS – International Studio Program 2007 – Stockholm, Sweden
- 2007–2008 Art in General new commissions program, New York
- 2008 International Residence Recollets, Paris
- 2009 Art in General new commissions program, 2007–2008, New York

== Work ==
Aranda's complex body of work exists outside the boundaries of the object, and is characterized by the struggle of catching sight of elusive concepts such as time, circulation, and imagination. Her installations and temporary projects, which often examine social interactions and the role that the circulation of objects plays in the cycles of production and consumption, are intensely site-specific. Much of her work takes up the concept of time, sometimes to consider alternative notions of the temporal experience, and other times to approach the arbitrariness of time and freedom from time.

=== You had no ninth of May ===
In You had no ninth of May! (2006), Aranda addresses the artificiality of the homogeneous construction of time through the case of Kiribati, an archipelago in the Pacific that, in 1995, changed the position of the International Date Line (IDL). Through a series of installation pieces that conceptually and formally map the international date line at Kiribati, the artist investigates officially assigned time and calls into question concepts such as "today" or "tomorrow".

=== There has been a miscalculation ===
Aranda's 2007 work There has been a miscalculation (Flattened Ammunition) is an experiment on the functioning of time. This work consists in a transparent Plexiglas cube containing approximately 100 science-fiction novels with a story line taking place before 2007 (the year in which the work was first produced), which have been shredded, almost pulverized. It also contains a hidden computerized air compressor that unexpectedly and violently blows the dust around at random intervals, recalling a sudden sandstorm. This way, Aranda's work makes books endlessly circulate and swirl in an empty cube, leaving them incessantly suspended in a past future.

=== Intervals ===
For Intervals (2009), a solo presentation of four works installed in the Solomon R. Guggenheim Museum, Aranda explored and inverted the notion of time as a strictly assigned linear designation marked by clocks and calendars. In this exhibition, all the works were proposed to partially describe, in the artist's words "a sense of time's passage according to subjective experience, rather than subscribed to a strict system of measurement that assigns a fixed duration to any given event". Each piece captures time's passage in an individualized sense, addressing what the artist conceives as "subject formation" and the assertion of one's dominion over one's own time as a condition for individualism.

== E-Flux ==
Julieta Aranda has been actively collaborating on e-flux since 2003, which is a publishing platform, archive, artist project, curatorial platform, and cultural enterprise founded by Anton Vidokle in 1998. Aranda is both a contributor and editor of e-flux journal, and in collaboration with Vidokle, has produced several e-flux art projects that explore unusual models for the circulation and distribution of art.

=== E-flux video rental ===
Conceived in 2004 in collaboration with Anton Vidokle, e-flux video rental (EVR) comprises a free VHS video rental store, a public screening room and an archive. Its collection is selected in collaboration with a large group of international curators, and consists of over 500 art films and video works that are available to the public for home viewing free of charge. The project was originally presented in a storefront in New York, and has been presented at various locations around the world, with the inventory of videos continuously increasing. After seven years as a traveling project, EVR was donated to the Moderna Galerija in Ljubljana in 2011 for its permanent display, which is a reconstruction of the original storefront at 53 Ludlow Street, New York. As a video rental store entering a museum collection, EVR will preserve and make available for future study not only the videos that comprise it, but also the social form of video rental stores, and the technology that originally made it possible.

=== Pawnshop ===
Released in 2007, Pawnshop is an e-flux project by artists Liz Linden, Julieta Aranda, and Anton Vidokle. Both an exhibition and an artwork in itself, this project was originally located in e-flux's 53 Ludlow Street storefront, which temporarily became a pawnshop dedicated to the pawning of artworks. Its initial inventory consisted of over 60 pawned works from a group of artists invited to participate in the project, and after it was opened for business, further artists were able walk in with a work they wanted to pawn. After the initial 30 days, the artworks that have not been retrieved by their original owners became available for sale.

=== Time/bank ===
An online platform initiated by Aranda and Vidokle, Time/Bank is based on the premise that everyone in the field of culture has something to contribute and that it is possible to develop and sustain an alternative economy by connecting existing needs with unacknowledged resources. On a practical level, it is a platform where artists, curators, writers and other people in the field, can exchange time and skills—help each other get things done without using money. Idealistically, Time/Bank can become a place where certain types of actions and ideas, that seem to have no value in our market-driven society, can gain a sense of worth.

It is possible to open a time bank account at e-flux.

=== Supercommunity ===
SUPERCOMMUNITY is an editorial project by e-flux journal commissioned for the 56th Venice Biennale, which was run from May to August 2015. Julieta Aranda, Anton Vidokle, and Brian Kuan Wood have been co-editors of this project, which addresses e-flux journal and its readership as the supercommunity and presents a daily piece of writing that often adopts the form of poetry, short fiction or screenplay. It has featured contributions from nearly one hundred authors such as anthropologists, artists, philosophers, poets, theorists and writers.

== Awards and recognition ==
Aranda has been awarded numerous grants and merit scholarships, from institutions such as FONCA, the National Foundation for the Culture and the Arts in Mexico (1995–1996), and both the School of Visual Arts (1995–1999), the National Board of Review (1996–1999) and Columbia University (2004) in New York. She has also been an artist in residence at UNIDEE, the International Program by Fondazione Pistoletto in Biella, Italy (2006), the International Artists Studio Program in Stockholm (2006), the International Residence of Recollets in Paris (2008) and Arts at CERN (2017). Her work has been shown in internationally renowned institutions such as the Museum of Contemporary Art, North Miami (2009); the Solomon R. Guggenheim Museum, New York (2009); the National Museum of Art, Architecture and Design, Oslo (2010); and Museo de Arte Contemporáneo de Castilla y León, Spain (2010), as well as at international art festivals such as the Liverpool Biennial (2010); the Kassel Documenta, Germany (2012); and the Shanghai Biennale (2012).

== See also ==
- Venice Biennale
- e-flux
- e-flux publications
- SUPERCOMMUNITY
- Accelerationism
- Anton Vidokle
