= Keti Chukhrov =

Russian philosopher

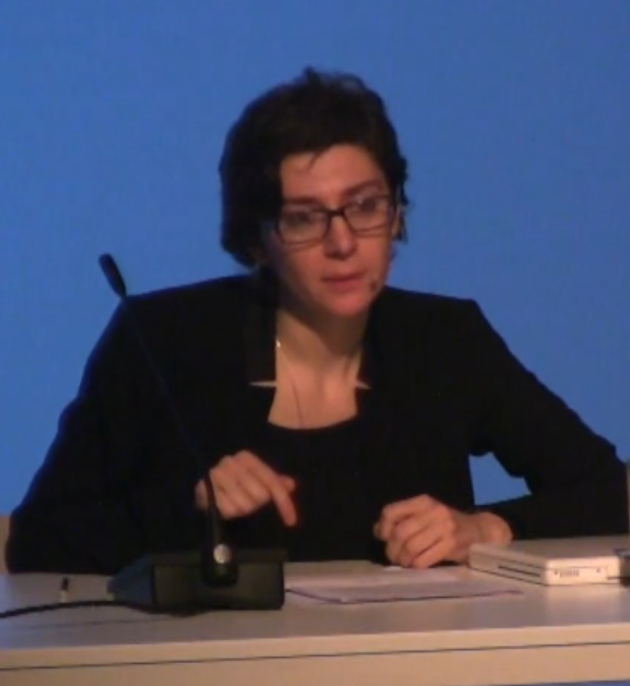
- Born: July 26, 1970
- Education: Moscow State University
- Occupations: Philosopher, art theorist
- Employers: Higher School of Economics (2016–); Russian State University for the Humanities (2010–2016)

Keti Chukhrov (Ketevan (Keti) Chukhrukidze (Chukhrov), Russian: Кетеван (Кети) Чухрукидзе (Чухров); born 26 July 1970 in Georgian Soviet Socialist Republic) is a philosopher, art-theorist and play-wright. She was an associate professor and then a professor at the School of Philosophy and Cultural Studies at the Higher School of Economics (Moscow) in 2016-2022. Since 2022 she is a guest professor at the Karlsruhe University of Arts and Design. In 2012-2017 she was the head of Theory and Research department at the National Center of Contemporary Art, Moscow. In 2017-2019 she has been a Marie Sklodowska Curie fellow in UK, Wolverhampton University. She has authored numerous texts on art theory, philosophy and cultural anthropology. Her latest book Practicing the Good. Desire and Boredom in Soviet Socialism (University of Minnesota Press, 2020) deals with the impact of socialist political economy on the epistemes of historical socialism. Her full-length books include: To Be—To Perform. ‘Theatre’ in Philosophic Critique of Art (European Un-ty, 2011), Pound &£ (Logos, 1999), and a volume of dramatic poems: Merely Humans (2010). Her research interests and publications deal with 1. Philosophy of performativity 2. Impact of political economics on the epistemologies of capitalist and non-capitalist societies respectively. 3. Art as the Institute of global Contemporaneity. She authored the dramatic video-poems Afghan-Kuzminki (2013), Love-machines (2013), Communion (2016), Undead (2022) based on her plays and featured at the Bergen Assembly (2013), the Specters of Communism show (James Gallery, NY, 2015), the Ljubljana Triennial U-3 (2016, cur. Z. Badovinac, B. Groys), Steirischer Herbst, the show “War in the Distance” (2022, cur. E. Degot).

== Career ==
She graduated from Philological Faculty of Lomonosov Moscow State University in 1994.

From 1998 to 2005, she worked as an editor and translator for Logos-Altera Publishers.

In 2007, she lectured at Humboldt University in Berlin.

From 2010 to 2016, she worked as a Docent at the Department of Art Theory and Cultural Studies at the Russian State University for the Humanities.

From 2012 to 2017, Chukhrov headed the department at National Center for Contemporary Art, Moscow.

She was a Marie S. Curie fellow (2017-2019) at the University of Wolverhampton.

She published in Voprosy Filosofii, Moscow Art Magazine, New Literary Review, Logos, and others.

She lived and worked in Moscow., but since 2022 has been residing mainly in Germany. Chukhrov speaks Georgian, Russian, English, French and German languages.

She was longlisted for the 2017 Kandinsky Prize. She was shortlisted for the 2011 Andrei Bely Prize.

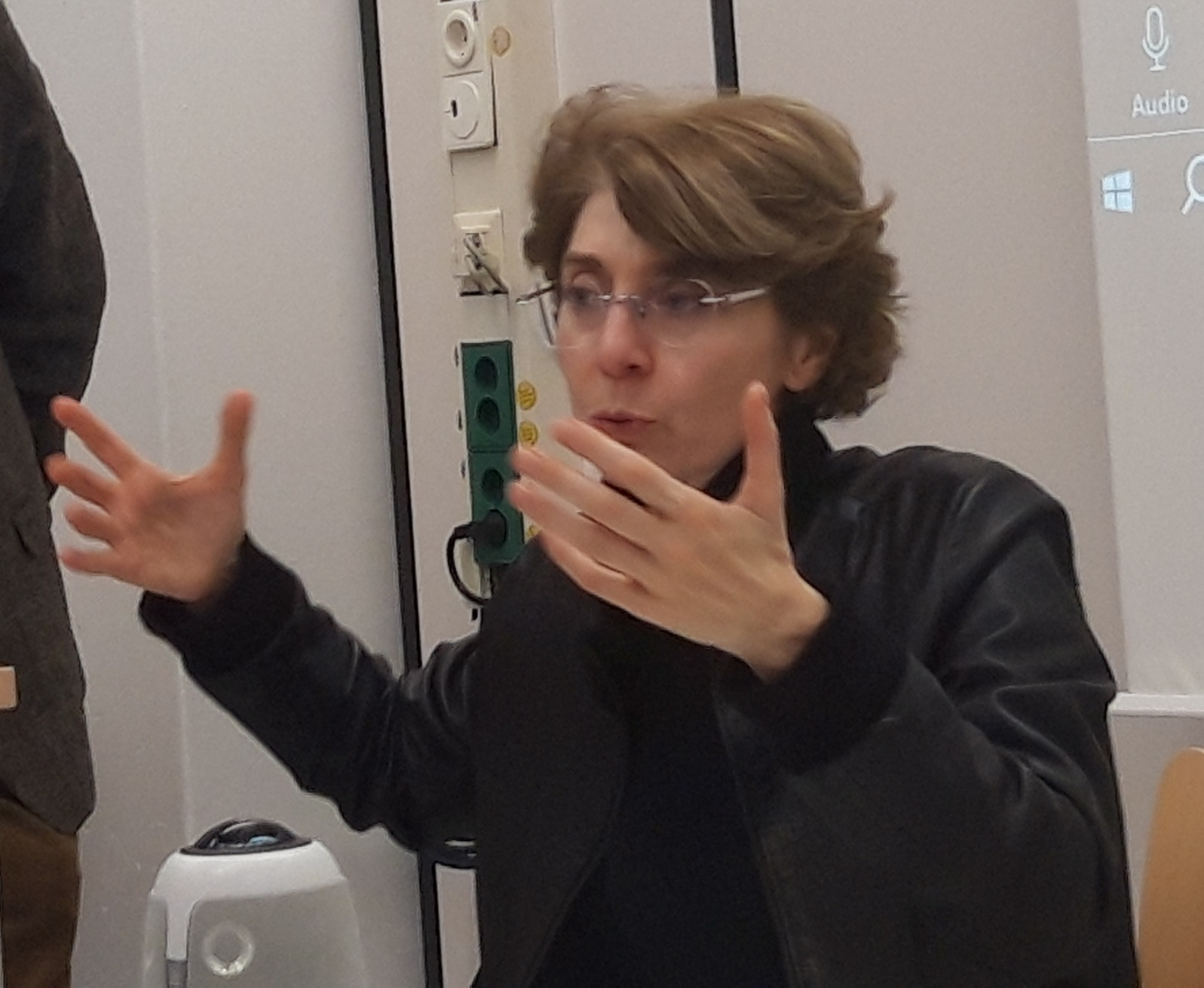
Keti Chukhrov delivers a lecture, November 2025
