= Hu Fang =

Chinese writer

Hu Fang (Chinese: 胡昉; born 1970) is a fiction writer, art critic and curator. He lives and works in Guangzhou and Beijing. He is the co-founder and artistic director of Vitamin Creative Space in Guangzhou and the Pavilion in Beijing. He has been involved in various international projects including documenta 12 magazines as coordinating editor and Yokohama Triennale 2008 as co-curator.

Hu Fang was born in Zhejiang Province, China, and studied at the Chinese Literature Department of Wuhan University. Fiction writing is a parallel with his curatorial practice, his published novels include Garden of Mirrored Flowers (Sternberg Press and Vitamin Creative Space, 2010), Pavilion to the Heart's Insight (Vol. I, Vitamin Creative Space, 2008), New Arcades (Survival Club, Sensation Fair, and Cool Shanshui) (MAP BOOK PUBLISHERS, 2006), Shopping Utopia (Bleu de Chine, Paris, 2003), and Exercises in Sensation: Theory and Practice + Sex History (Huacheng Publishing House, 1998).
