= Vasily Chekrygin =

Russian painter

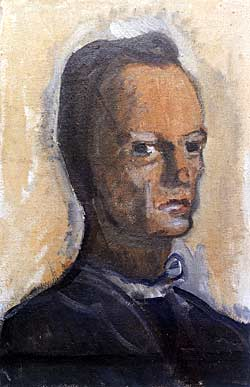
Vasily Chekrygin, self-portrait

Vasily Nikolaevich Chekrygin (Russian: Василий Никoлаeвич Чeкpыгин; January 19, 1897, Zhizdra, Kaluga Oblast - June 3, 1922, the station Mamontovka, Moscow region) was a Soviet painter, graphic artist.

== Biography ==
He spent his childhood in Kiev. He studied at the school of icon painting at the Kiev-Pechersk Lavra and urban school (course of 6 years). At thirteen he entered the Moscow School of Painting, Sculpture and Architecture.

The first illustrated and printed in lithography poetry of Mayakovsky.

Creative and the life of the artist broke very early. At the age of twenty-five years Chekrygin died after being hit by a train.
