= Mary Walling Blackburn =

American artist

- Born: 1972 (age 53–54); Orange, California, U.S.
- Education: University of New Hampshire
- Awards: Art Matters Award 2011
- Website: welcomedoubleagent.com

Mary Walling Blackburn (born 1972) is an American artist, writer, and feminist who is the director of the Anhoek School and its sister radio station WMYN. She teaches art at Southern Methodist University. She has been described as "“a singer, a tutor, a choreographer, a documentary filmmaker, a tourist, a critic and a translator” with a strong but politically uncategorizable activist streak."

== Anhoek School ==
Blackburn created the Anhoek School as an educational experiment, an alternative to the GRE system. It is an all-women's graduate school that bases its curriculum on cultural production. Tuition is based on a barter system where student labor is exchanged for classes. Its name is a "purposeful malappropriation" of the name Ann Hutchinson, a midwife in the Massachusetts Bay Colony, who was expelled from the colony on charges of heresy, witchcraft and political anarchy.

== Publications ==
- Sister Apple, Sister Pig, 2014.
- Art in America, After Glenn Beck’s Blast, a Conversation with Mary Walling Blackburn, Vogel, Wendy, 2015.
- E-flux Journal #92: Sticky Notes 1–3, 2018.
