= Hito Steyerl =

German filmmaker (born 1966)

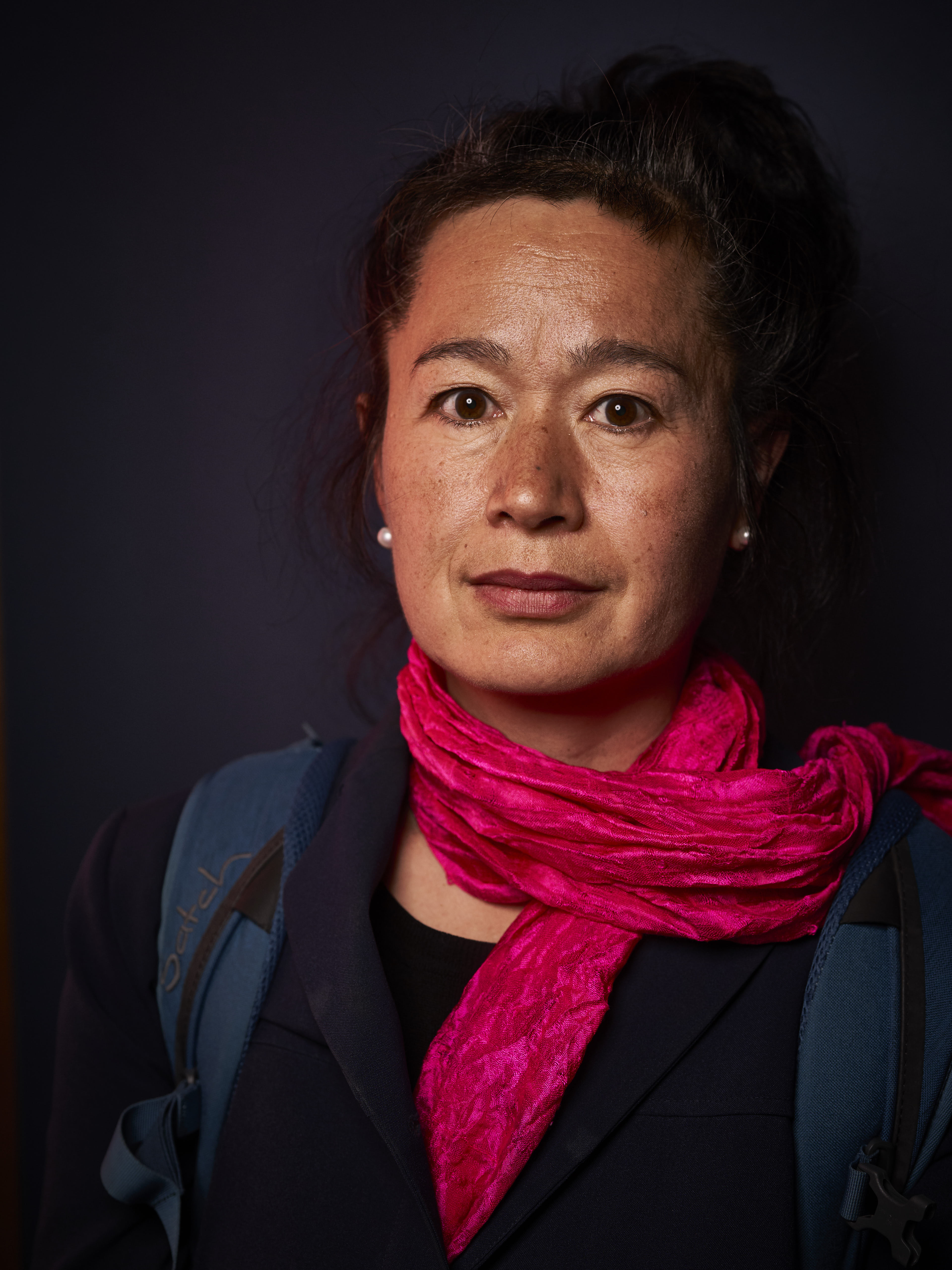
- Steyerl in 2019
- Born: Hito Steyerl; 1 January 1966 (age 60); Munich, West Germany (now Germany)
- Education: Japan Institute of the Moving Image; University of Television and Film Munich; Academy of Fine Arts Vienna
- Known for: Filmmaker; visual artist; writer
- Notable work: How Not To Be Seen. A Fucking Didactic Educational.MOV File (2013); Factory of the Sun (2015)
- Movement: Conceptual Art
- Awards: Yanghyun Prize; Käthe Kollwitz Prize

Hito Steyerl (born 1 January 1966, Munich) is a German filmmaker, moving image artist, writer, and innovator of the essay documentary. Her principal topics of interest are media, technology, and the global circulation of images.

She has been a professor of Current Digital Media at the Academy of Fine Arts in Munich since 2024. Until 2024, she was a professor of New Media Art at the Berlin University of the Arts, where she co-founded the Research Center for Proxy Politics, together with Vera Tollmann and Boaz Levin.

== Early life and education ==
Steyerl holds a PhD in Philosophy from the Academy of Fine Arts Vienna. She later attended the Japan Institute of the Moving Image. She later studied at the University of Television and Film Munich. Steyerl was deeply influenced by Harun Farocki, although she has cited her former professor, the film historian Helmut Färber, as having a more direct influence on her work.

== Work ==
In 2004 Steyerl participated in Manifesta 5, The European Biennial of Contemporary Art. She has also participated in the 2008 Shanghai Biennale and the 2010 Gwangju and Taipei biennials. In 2007, her film Lovely Andrea was exhibited as a part of documenta 12 in Kassel, Germany. In 2013 her work was included in the Venice Biennale and the Istanbul Biennial. In 2015, her work was included in the German pavilion at the Venice Biennale. In 2019, it was featured in the Arsenale of the Venice Biennale.

Steyerl's work pushes the boundary of traditional video, often obscuring what is real beneath many layers of metaphors and satirical humor. She referred to her piece, Red Alert, as "the outer limit of video". Red Alert consists of three monitors playing a video of pure red, and was commissioned to be a static representation of Steyerl's film Lovely Andrea. The color red was chosen for its connotations to terror alerts and red-light districts, referencing the themes of military violence and pornographic exploitation present in Lovely Andrea.

Her work concerns topics of militarization, surveillance migration, the role of media in globalization, and the dissemination of images and the culture surrounding it. Steyerl has pushed both the role and the label of fine artist, which is demonstrated through her tendencies and interests in engaging the presentational context of art. Her work is developed from research, interviews, and the collection of found images, culminating in pedagogically oriented work in the realm of forensic documentaries and dream-like montages.

In recent years, Steyerl's work has expanded to confront the status of images in an increasingly digital world, institutions (including museums), networks, and labor. Her work has addressed the topic of corporate sponsorship by engaging with institutions, including Drill in 2019 at the Park Avenue Armory in New York, for which Steyerl revealed histories connecting the building hosting the exhibition with the founding of the National Rifle Association. On the topic of private funding, Steyerl has expressed: 'Ultimately, it will be important to move beyond protests against individuals and try to frame the problems more generally in terms of a new charter for the art world: a set of principles that include different aspects, like pay, sponsorship, governance, transparency standards, representation, sustainability, and so on, like a new deal for museums.' In April 2019, Hito Steyerl incorporated an interactive app into her exhibition at London's Serpentine Galleries, titled 'Power Plants', which used augmented reality to display floating data, text, and graphs around the museum space. 'Power Plants' highlighted inequalities in South Kensington, London, and erasing the Sackler name from the Serpentine Sackler Gallery entrance as a commentary on power structures in contemporary technology. Steyerl employs increasingly complex approaches to pixelation within the digital sphere, editing, digital graphics, and video installation architecture. In 2025, Steyerl, along with Nora O'Murchú, and Sam Lavigne served on a jury to select works for Error 417 Expectation Failed's open call for works confronting tech fascism, culminating in the online show 13 Scores Against Tech Fascism.

=== How Not To Be Seen: A Fucking Didactic Educational .MOV File ===
In 2013, Steyerl released her 14 minute video How Not to Be Seen, presenting five lessons in invisibility. These lessons include how to 1. Make something invisible for a camera, 2. Be invisible in plain sight, 3. Become invisible by becoming a picture, 4. Be invisible by disappearing, and 5. Become invisible by merging into a world made of pictures. How Not to Be Seen is a satirical take on instructional films. Much of the video also deals with surveillance and digital imagery: for example, figures in all black dance around as "pixels," and aerial photography features frequently. It was named by Frieze as No.24 of "The 25 Best Works of the 21st Century".

=== Liquidity, Inc. ===
Liquidity, Inc., (2014) consists of a video and a seating/backdrop installation. The video includes interviews with Jason Wood, a financial-advisor-turned-MMA-fighter, mesmerizing clips of ocean waves, and mock-weather reports from characters in balaclavas. As these visuals swirl around, a metaphor forms between water and images/money/trend in the digital age.

=== Factory of the Sun ===
Factory of the Sun, like Liquidity, Inc. deals with finance. In this video, which debuted at the 2015 Venice Biennial, clip art people swarm and create "artificial sunshine" for a bank. The video utilises light, sunshine, and warmth as motifs as it explores surveillance and mega-finance.

== Solo exhibitions ==
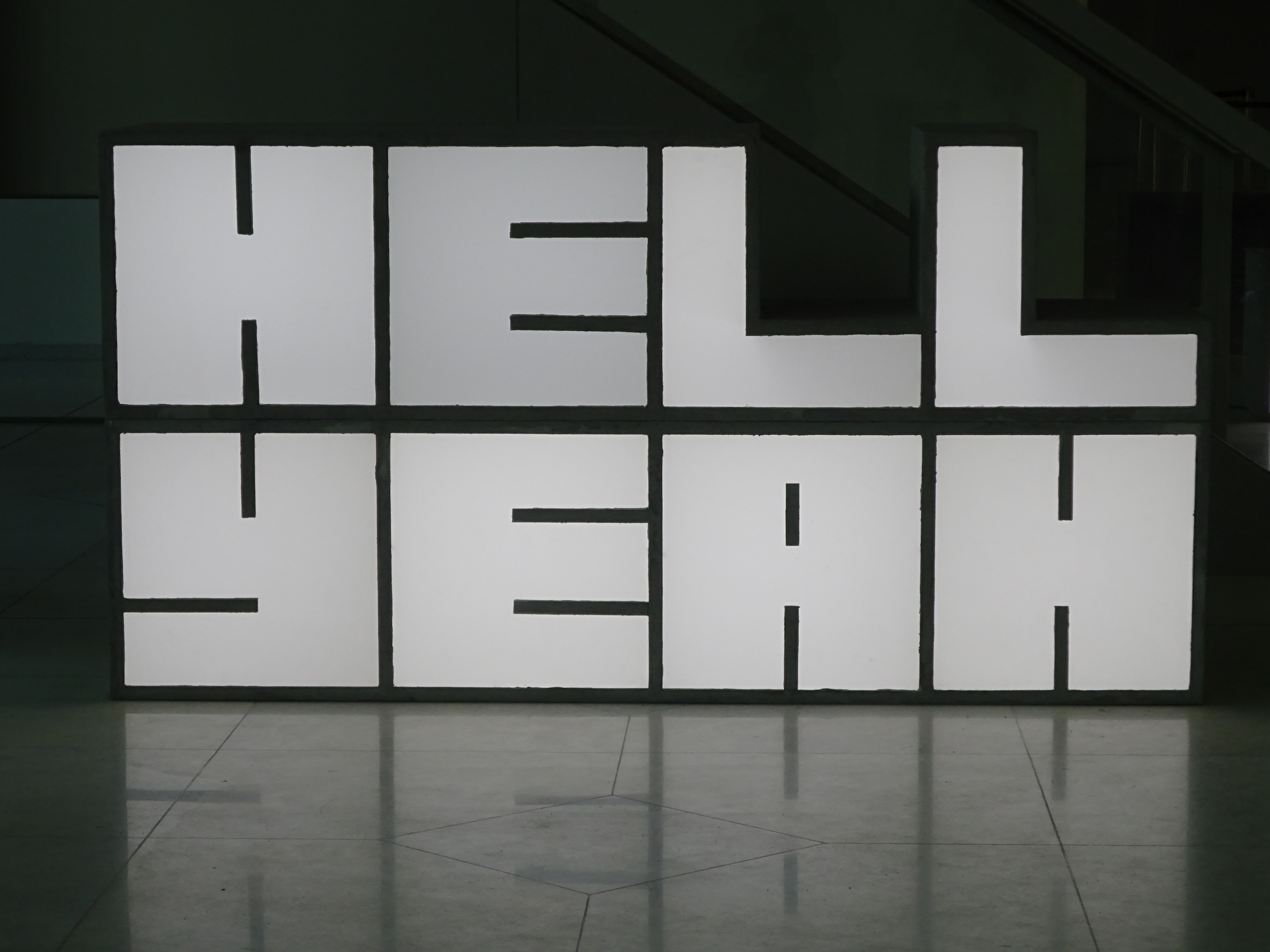
Installation view of Hell Yeah We Fuck Die, 2016

- Hito Steyerl, Chisenhale Gallery, London (2010)
- Hito Steyerl, E-flux, New York (2012)
- Hito Steyerl, Art Institute of Chicago, (2012)
- Hito Steyerl, Van Abbemuseum, Eindhoven, Netherlands (2014)
- Hito Steyerl, Institute of Contemporary Arts, London (2014)
- En defensa de la imagen pobre ("In defense of the poor image") and Arte, control y dominación. 3 películas de Hito Steyerl ("Art, control and domination. 3 films of Hito Steyerl"), MUNTREF as part of the Bienal de la Imagen en Movimiento (BIM) (2014)
- Hito Steyerl, How Not To Be Seen: A Fucking Didactic Educational Installation, Andrew Kreps Gallery, New York (2014)
- Hito Steyerl, Artists Space, New York (2015)
- Hito Steyerl, Left To Our Own Devices, KOW, Berlin (2015)
- Hito Steyerl, Duty-Free Art, Museo Nacional Centro de Arte Reina Sofía, Madrid (2015)
- Hito Steyerl, Factory of the Sun, Museum of Contemporary Art, Los Angeles (2016)
- Hito Steyerl, Factory of the Sun, Hartware MedienKunstVerein in the Dortmunder U, Dortmund, Germany (2016)
- Hito Steyerl, The City of Broken Windows, Museo d'Arte Contemporanea Castello di Rivoli, Turin (2018)
- Hito Steyerl, Power Plants, Serpentine Galleries, London (2019)
- Hito Steryerl, The City of Broken Windows, Rivoli Castle (2019)
- Hito Steyerl, This is the Future, Art Gallery of Ontario, Toronto, Canada (2020)
- Hito Steyerl, I Will Survive, Stedelijk Museum, Amsterdam (2022)
- Hito Steyerl, Animal Spirits, Esther Schipper Gallery, Berlin (2022)

== Notable works ==
- Lovely Andrea (2007)
- Red Alert (2007)
- How to Not Be Seen: A Fucking Didactic Educational .MOV File (2013)
- Is the Museum a Battlefield? (2013)
- Guards (2012)
- Liquidity Inc. (2014)
- Factory of the Sun (2015)
- Drill (2019)
- Green Screen (2023)
- Mechanical Kurds (2025)

== Awards ==
In 2017, Steyerl was listed by ArtReview as the number one most influential person in the contemporary art world. In 2023, Steyerl was again listed by ArtReview as the number two most influential person in the contemporary art world.

Other awards include:

- 2010 – NEW:VISION Award, presented by the Copenhagen International Documentary Festival for the film In Free Fall
- 2015 – EYE Prize, presented by the EYE Film Institute Netherlands and the Paddy & Joan Leigh Fermor Arts Fund
- 2019 – Käthe Kollwitz Prize
- 2021 – Frank-Walter Steinmeier, the German president, offered Steyerl the Federal Cross of Merit which Steyerl turned down

== Select writings ==
Steyerl is a frequent contributor to online art journals such as E-flux. She has also written:

- 2007. Steyerl, Hito. "Documentary Uncertainty," in A Prior Magazine Issue #15.
- 2009. Steyerl, Hito. "The Institution of Critique," in Art and Contemporary Critical Practice: Reinventing Institutional Critique. Mayflybooks/Ephemera. Edited by Gerald Raunig and Gene Ray ISBN 978-1-906948-02-3
- 2009. Steyerl, Hito. "In Defense of the Poor Image," in E-flux Issue #10.
- 2010. Steyerl, Hito. "A Thing Like You and Me," in E-flux Issue #15.
- 2012. Steyerl, Hito, and Berardi, Franco. The Wretched of the Screen. Sternberg Press. ISBN 978-1-934105-82-5.
- 2014. Steyerl, Hito. Hito Steyerl: Too Much World. Sternberg Press. Edited by Nick Aikens. ISBN 978-3-95679-057-7
- 2016. Steyerl, Hito. Jenseits der Repräsentation / Beyond Representation: Essays 1999–2009. Walther König. Edited by Marius Babias, contributions by Thomas Elsässer and Simon Sheik. ISBN 978-3-86560-893-2
- 2016. Steyerl, Hito. "If You Don’t Have Bread, Eat Art!: Contemporary Art and Derivative Fascisms," in E-flux Issue #76.
- 2017. Steyerl, Hito. Duty Free Art: Art in the Age of Planetary Civil War. Verso. ISBN 978-1-78663-243-2

== See also ==
- Post-Internet art
