= Elizabeth Povinelli =

Professor of Anthropology and Gender Studies

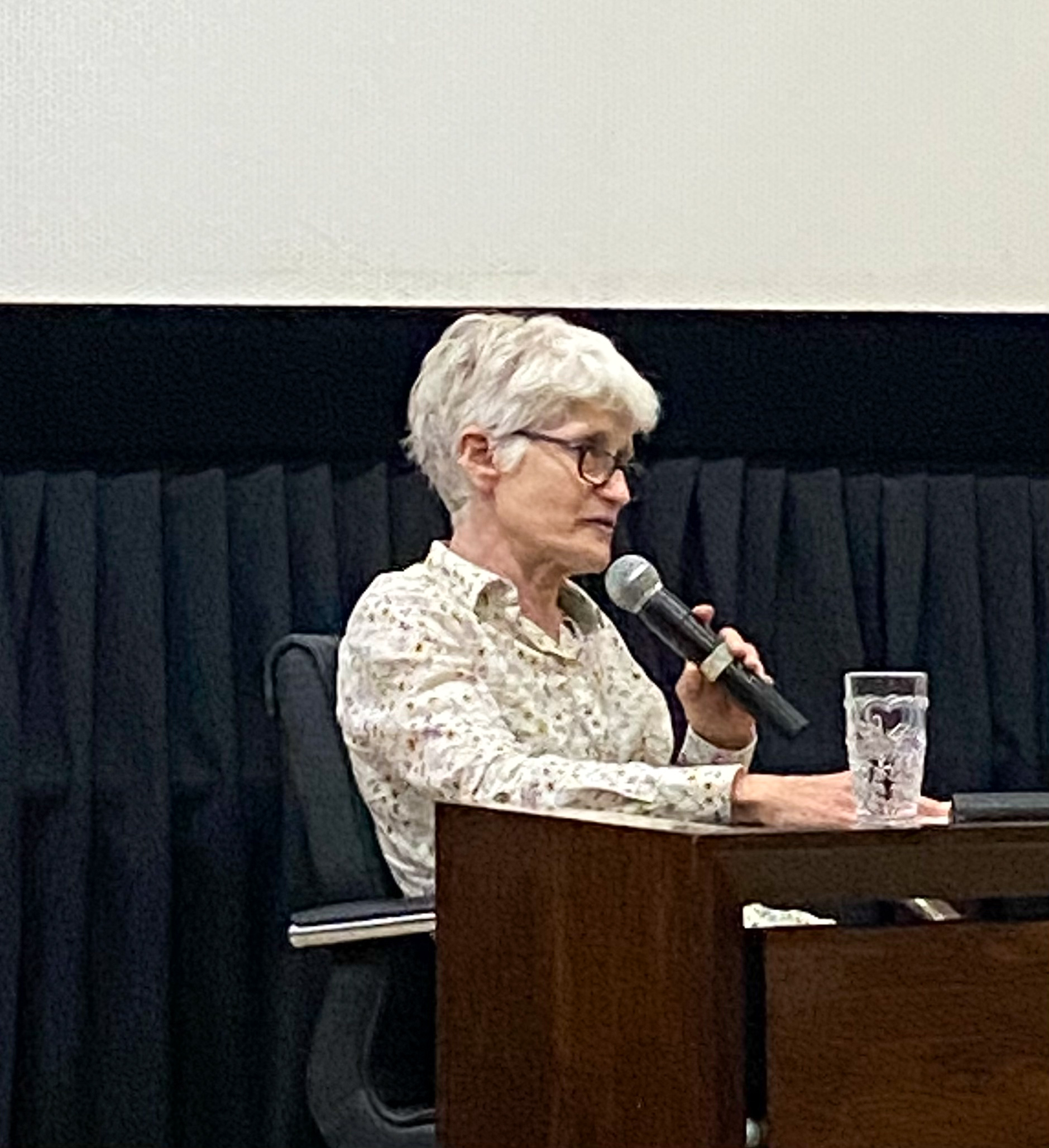
- Born: Elizabeth A. Povinelli; February 3, 1962 (age 64); Buffalo, New York, US

Education
- Education: Yale University

Philosophical work
- Institutions: Columbia University
- Main interests: Anthropology, Gender Studies
- Notable ideas: Anthropology of otherwise

Elizabeth A. Povinelli FAHA is Franz Boas Professor of Anthropology and Gender Studies at Columbia University, where she has also been the Director of the Institute for Research on Women and Gender and the Co-Director of the Centre for the Study of Law and Culture. She received her Ph.D. in Anthropology from Yale University in 1991. She is the author of books and essays of critical theory as well as a former editor of the academic journal Public Culture.

She was the recipient of the German Transatlantic Program Prize and Fellow at the American Academy in Berlin for Fall 2011. In 2018 she was elected a Corresponding Fellow of the Australian Academy of the Humanities. She received an honorary degree in the Arts from the University of Antwerp in 2025.

== Academic work and publications ==
Povinelli's work has focused on developing a critical theory of late liberalism that would support an "anthropology of the otherwise". This critical task is animated by a critical engagement with the traditions of American pragmatism and continental immanent critique and grounded in the circulation of values, materialities, and socialities within settler liberalisms. Her first two books examined the governance of the otherwise in late liberal settler colonies from the perspective of the politics of recognition. In particular, they focused on impasses within liberal systems of law and value as they meet local Australian indigenous worlds, and the effect of these impasses on the development of legal and public culture in Australia. Her second two books, The Empire of Love: Toward a Theory of Intimacy, Genealogy, and Carnality and Economies of Abandonment: Social Belonging and Endurance in Late Liberalism, examine formations of the Late Liberal Anthropocene from the perspective of intimacy, embodiment, and narrative form. Her books, Geontologies, Between Gaia and Ground, and The Inheritance explore the governance of existence, political identity and the problem of the ancestral. Geontologies received the 2017 Lionel Trilling Award. The Inheritance received a starred review on Kirkus.

== Films with Karrabing ==
Povinelli is one of the founding members of the Karrabing Film Collective. They have made eight major films including Karrabing, Low Tide Turning, which were selected for the 2012 Berlin International Film Festival, Shorts Competition,When the Dogs Talked, and Windjarrameru, The Stealing C*nt$ which premiered at the 2015 Melbourne International Film Festival. Povinelli and the Karrabing Indigenous Corporation received the MIFF 2015 Cinema Nova Award for Best Short Fiction Film for When the Dogs Talked. The Karrabing Film Collective received the 2015 Visible Award. Their corpus of work received the Eye Prize from the Eye Filmmuseum, Amesterdam in 2021.

== Individual Films & Art Works ==
Povinelli's individual artworks have been shown in a number of galleries including Prometeo Gallery, Milan, ar/ge gallery, Bolzano, the Biennale Gherdëina, and MADRE, Naples. Her film, The Inheritance, made with Thomas Bartlett, premiered with Taxispalais, Innsbruck. A series of her drawings reimagining prehistory as a series of colonial sedimentations was part of the reopening of the Museo delle Civiltà, Rome, in 2022.

Povinelli also appeared in the documentary film Apparition of the Eternal Church (2006), directed by Paul Festa, about the French composer Olivier Messiaen's organ work.

== Selected bibliography ==
- Routes/Worlds. eflux books Sternberg Press, 2022.
- Between Gaia and Ground: Four Axioms of Existence and the Ancestral Catastrophe of Late Liberalism. Duke University Press, 2021.
- The Inheritance, Duke University Press. Duke University Press, 2021.
- Geontologies: A Requiem to Late Liberalism, Duke University Press. Duke University Press, 2016.
- Economies of Abandonment: Social Belonging and Endurance in Late Liberalism. Duke University Press. Duke University Press, 2011.
- "Interview with Elizabeth Povinelli by Kim Turcot DiFruscia, Alterites Femmes, 7.1: 88-98.
- "Digital Futures." Vectors Journal of Culture and Technology in a Dynamic Vernacular, 3.2.2009.
- The Empire of Love: Toward a Theory of Intimacy, Genealogy, and Carnality. A Public Planet Book. Duke University Press, 2006.
- "Technologies of Public Form: Circulation, Transfiguration, Recognition." In Technologies of Public Persuasion, Dilip Parameshwar Gaonkar and Elizabeth A. Povinelli, eds. 15(3): 385-397, 2003.
- The Cunning of Recognition: Indigenous Alterities and the Making of Australian Multiculturalism. Durham: Duke University Press, 2002.
- "Radical Worlds: The Anthropology of Incommensurability and Inconceivability." Annual Review of Anthropology. Volume 30: 319-34, 2001.
- Labor's Lot: The Power, History and Culture of Aboriginal Action. Chicago: The University of Chicago Press, 1994.
