= Bosek =

Bosek is a surname. Notable people with the surname include:

- Peter Bosek (born 1968), Austrian bank manager
- Ryszard Bosek (born 1950), Polish volleyball player and coach
