= Erste Bank Croatia =

Bank in Croatia

- Company type: Public limited company
- Industry: Financial services
- Predecessor: Riječka Banka, Bjelovarska banka, Trgovačka banka, and Čakovečka banka
- Founded: 2000; 26 years ago
- Headquarters: Zagreb, Croatia
- Area served: Croatia
- Products: Banking services
- Website: www.erstebank.hr

Erste Bank Croatia officially known as Erste & Steiermärkische Bank d.d. is a bank in Croatia, with registered office in Rijeka and operational headquarters in Zagreb.

As of 2020, it was Croatia's third-largest bank by total assets. It is jointly owned by Erste Group Bank and Steiermärkische Bank und Sparkassen, both members of the Austrian Savings Banks Group. It was largely formed by acquisition of several pre-existing entities, including Riječka Banka which had been established in 1954.

== History ==
In 1998, Erste Bank acquired three local banks in Croatia, respectively Bjelovarska banka (est. 1954) in Bjelovar, Trgovačka banka (est. 1990) in Zagreb, and Čakovečka banka (est. 1995) in Čakovec. In September 2000, the three banks were integrated into a single entity, named Erste & Steiermärkische Bank (ESB), which became a member of Erste Group. In May 2002, ESB purchased Riječka Banka (est. 1954), headquartered in Rijeka. Following that transaction, the entity's registered office has been maintained in Rijeka.

As of end-2023, Erste Group Bank held 59 percent of the equity capital of ESB, and Steiermärkische Bank und Sparkassen held 41 percent. Since the former also owns 25 percent of the latter, the economic interest of Erste Group Bank in ESB amounts to 69.25 percent.

== See also ==
- List of banks in Croatia
