= Andreas Treichl =

Austrian bank manager (born 1952)

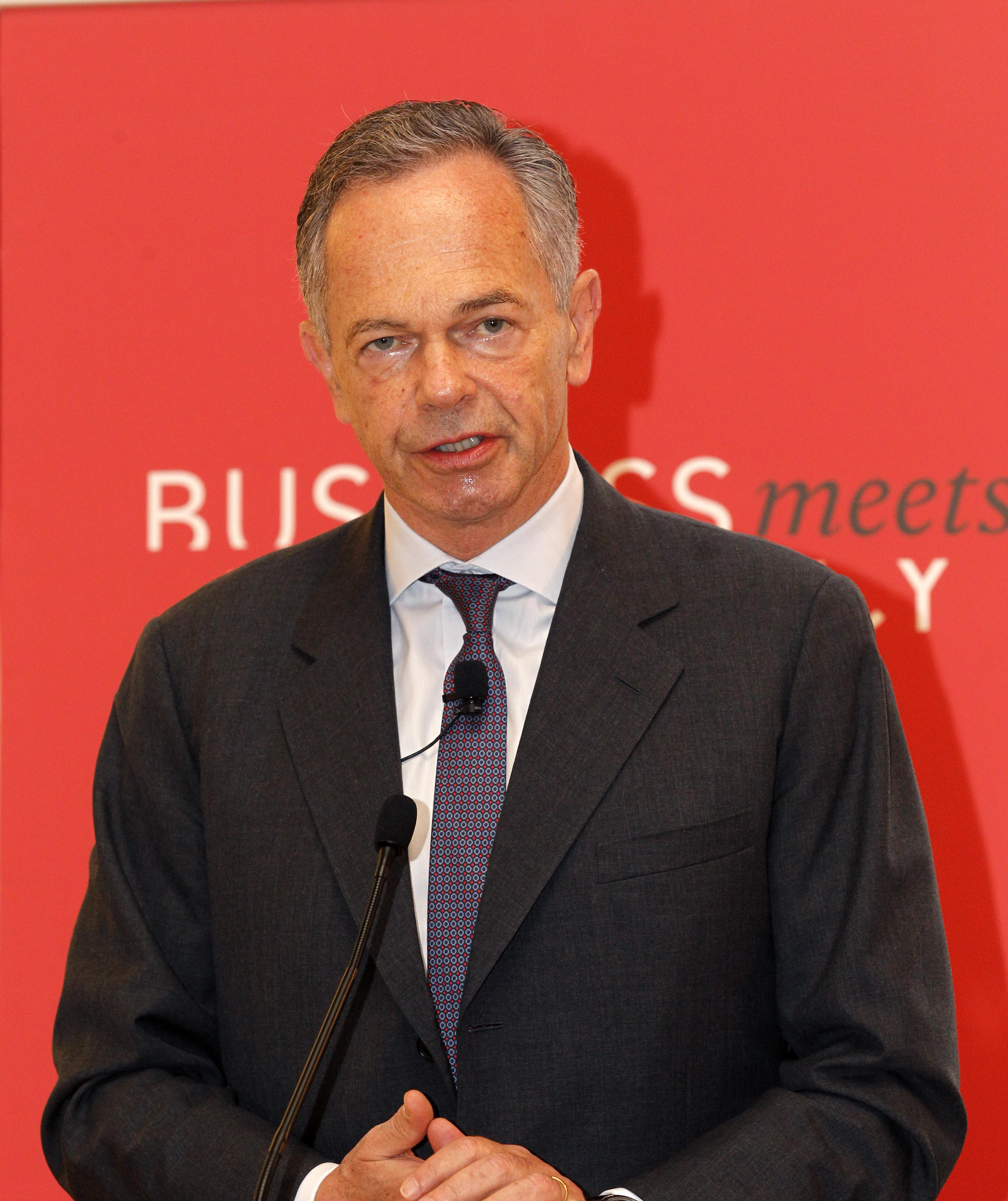
- Treichl in 2016
- Born: 16 June 1952 (age 73); Vienna, Austria
- Citizenship: Austrian
- Education: Schottengymnasium; University of Vienna (Economics)
- Years active: 1977–present
- Employer: Erste Group Bank AG
- Known for: Founder of Die Zweite Sparkasse
- Political party: Austrian People's Party (ÖVP)
- Awards: Grand Decoration of Honour in Gold for Services to the Republic of Austria (2007)

Andreas Treichl (born 16 June 1952, in Vienna) is an Austrian bank manager.

== Early life and education ==
Treichl attended the Schottengymnasium in Vienna (Upper Secondary School) and subsequently completed studies in economics at the University of Vienna.

== Career ==
Treichl worked at several branches of Chase Manhattan Bank in a number of European and American cities from 1977 to 1983. From 1983 to 1986, he was a member of the senior management at Erste Bank der oesterreichischen Sparkassen AG. From 1986 to 1993, he was chairman of Chase Manhattan Bank Austria, and from 1993 to 1994, chairman of Crédit Lyonnais Austria.

In 1997, Treichl became Chairman of the Board of Erste Bank, and since 2008, he has been Chief Executive Officer of Erste Group Bank AG. The largest shareholder of Erste Group is ERSTE Stiftung of which Treichl has been chairman since the end of 2012. ERSTE Stiftung is one of the largest non-profit organisations in Europe. Its activities focus on the region of Central and Eastern Europe, which is Erste Group’s home market, and include programmes for social integration, culture and Europe. Moreover, Andreas Treichl initiated the project “Die Zweite Sparkasse” and played a key role in its implementation.

In addition to his career in banking, Treichl was finance director of the federal organization of the Austrian People's Party (Österreichische Volkspartei, ÖVP) from 1991 to 1997. In June 2010, he was an invited guest at the 58th Bilderberg Conference in Sitges.

== Other activities ==
- European Council on Foreign Relations (ECFR), Member
- GLOBSEC, Member of the International Advisory Council
- Open Society Foundations, Member of the European Advisory Board
- International Monetary Conference (IMC), Member of the Board
- Institute of International Finance (IIF), Member of the Board
- Trilateral Commission, Member of the European Group

== Recognition ==
Treichl was named Manager of the Year by the Vienna University of Economics on 12 November 2007.

Other honors include:

- 2001: Grand Decoration of Honour in Silver for Services to the Republic of Austria
- 2007: Grand Decoration of Honour in Gold for Services to the Republic of Austria
- 2007: Economic-Manager of the year
- 2012: Grand Order of the Tyrolean Eagle

== Personal life ==
Andreas Treichl is married to Desirée Treichl-Stürgkh and has three sons. Treichl is the son of Heinrich Treichl.
