= ERSTE Foundation =

Austrian savings bank foundation

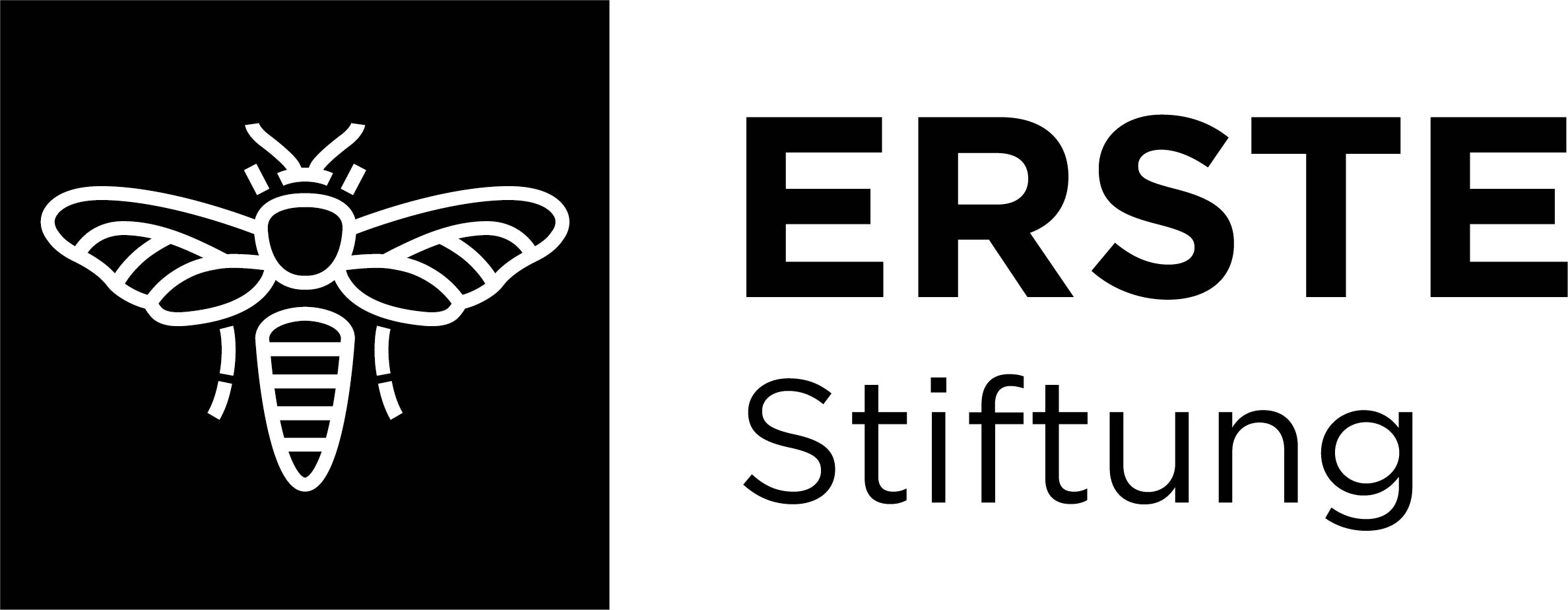
- Founded: 2003
- Type: Austrian private foundation
- Purpose: philanthropic
- Location: Vienna, Austria
- Origins: legal successor of Erste oesterreichische Spar-Casse (First Austrian Savings Bank) of 1819
- Region served: Central, Eastern and South Eastern Europe
- Method: operational foundation and grant giving
- Leader: Andreas Treichl (CEO)
- Board of directors: Philipp Thurn und Taxis (Deputy CEO); Gudrun Egger; Martin Wohlmuth
- Revenue: core shareholder of Erste Group Bank AG
- Employees: approx. 30
- Website: www.erstestiftung.org

ERSTE Foundation (in German DIE ERSTE österreichische Spar-Casse Privatstiftung or in short: ERSTE Stiftung) is the biggest Austrian savings bank foundation. In 2003, it evolved from the Erste österreichische Spar-Casse, the first Austrian savings bank founded in 1819. It is the core shareholder of Erste Group. As a private Austrian savings banks foundation, the foundation invests parts of its dividends to support the development of societies in Central and South Eastern Europe.

== Mission ==
ERSTE Foundation is active in Central and South Eastern Europe. Its mission goes back to the savings banks idea of the 19th century. It supports social participation and civil society engagement; it aims to bring people together and disseminate knowledge of the recent history of a region that has been undergoing dramatic changes since 1989.

=== Projects (examples) ===
- Zweite Sparkasse (Second Savings Bank) – was ERSTE Foundation’s first project aimed at promoting social and financial inclusion. Its main objective is to enable customers to regain a sound financial footing in the long term.
- NGO Academy – was founded in 2013 with the aim of providing educational services. It offers executive managers and members of NGOs a range of programmes to strengthen organisational structures and enhance management skills. The academy is organised in cooperation with the Competence Center for Nonprofit Organizations and Social Entrepreneurship of Vienna University of Economics and Business (WU Wien).
- Europe's Futures - Ideas for Action – is a cooperation with the Institute for Human Sciences in Vienna and its social and political scientists, and leading European organisations and think tanks, addressing crucial topics related to the European Union: asylum and migration, rule of law and democracy, European enlargement and social inclusion.
- Balkan Fellowship for Journalistic Excellence – Fellowship for journalists from 10 Balkan countries in cooperation with the Balkan Investigative Reporting Network and Open Society Foundations to strengthen democracy and free speech through good quality journalism in media.
- Reporting Democracy – Reporting Democracy is a cross-border journalistic platform, implemented by the Balkan Investigative Reporting Network, dedicated to exploring where democracy is headed across large parts of Europe.
- Kontakt. The Art Collection of Erste Group and ERSTE Foundation – Its purpose is the support and promotion of Central, East and Southeast European Art.
- tranzit.org – is a network of autonomous initiatives working in the field of contemporary art in Austria, the Czech Republic, Hungary, Romania and the Slovak Republic and across the borders of a wider Europe. Each tranzit initiative works under its own conditions in a variety of local, cultural and social contexts. Activities range from exhibitions, thematic projects, and seminars to publications based on long-term research and participatory interventions into the public discourse.
- Alles Clara - is a digital support service for people in Austria who are caring for loved ones. Everything Clara connects them with professional advisors trained in online counselingSocial Impact Investment

=== Igor Zabel Award for Culture and Theory ===
ERSTE Foundation established the biennial Igor Zabel Award for Culture and Theory in 2008. It supports the work of art historians and theorists in CEE and highlights the notion of arts and culture, encouraging the production of cultural knowledge and exchange between ‘East’ and ‘West’. The award is named after the Slovenian author, art critic and curator Igor Zabel (1958–2005), the senior curator of Ljubljana's Moderna Galerija. He established cultural links between Eastern and Western Europe.

Winners:

- WHW (What, How and for Whom?) (2008)
- Piotr Piotrowski (2010)
- Suzana Milevska (2012)
- Ekaterina Degot (2014)
- Viktor Misiano (2016)
- Joanna Mytkowska (2018)
- Zdenka Badovinac (2020)
- Bojana Pejić (2022)

=== Cooperations with other foundations in international projects ===
- European Fund for the Balkans (EFB)
- Grant Makers East Forum of the European Foundation Centre (efc)
- Civitates - a philanthropic initiative for democracy and solidarity in Europe

== Tipping Point Magazine ==
Since 2018 ERSTE Foundation publishes stories and reports from media in the region (e.g. Dennik N, Political Critique, Gazeta Wyborcza) as well as original articles in its bilingual online magazine (German/English). The magazine follows developments significant to society, politics and culture in Central, Eastern and South Eastern Europe. It supplies images and concepts on topical issues, encourages discussion and contributes to current debates.

== History ==
The origins of the foundation go back to the 19th century. The Erste österreichische Spar-Casse was founded in 1819. As a result of the amendment to the Austrian Savings Bank Act, Erste österreichische Spar-Casse was split into an operational bank (Erste Bank AG) and a holding company (DIE ERSTE österreichische Spar-Casse Anteilsverwaltungssparkasse, in short: AVS) in 1993. In 1997 Erste Bank, which had merged with GiroCredit Bank AG der Sparkassen, went public, making AVS the main shareholder of the company, which has been listed on the Vienna Stock Exchange ever since. In 2003 AVS was formally transformed into DIE ERSTE österreichische Spar-Casse Privatstiftung, in short: ERSTE Stiftung (ERSTE Foundation), which began its operations two years later.

== Organisation ==
ERSTE Foundation is a savings bank private foundation as defined by the Austrian Savings Bank Act.

=== Boards ===
The bodies of the foundation include the Managing Board, the Supervisory Board and the Association. The private Savings Bank Association, established in 1819 and comprising more than 100 members, elects the members of the Supervisory Board and designates its president. The Supervisory Board appoints the members of the Managing Board and supervises the foundation’s management. The Managing Board conducts the foundation’s business and decides on the allocation of project funding, assisted by an Advisory Board of international experts.

==== Members of the supervisory board ====
- Bettina Breiteneder
- Eva Höltl
- Johanna Mair
- Barbara Pichler
- Markus Posch
- Markus Trauttmansdorff (Deputy Chairman)
- Kurt Zangerle
- Manfred Wimmer (Chairman)

==== Members of the managing board ====
- Andreas Treichl (CEO)
- Philipp Thurn und Taxis (Deputy CEO)
- Gudrun Egger (Member of the Board)
- Martin Wohlmuth (Member of the Board)

=== Employees, budget and projects ===
At ERSTE Foundation work around 30 employees in 2024. More than 2,200 projects have been implemented or supported since 2005. ERSTE Foundation’s total project expenditure 2005–2023: more than EUR 148 mio.

=== Memberships in umbrella organisations ===
The foundation is a member of the following national and international umbrella organizations:

- Philanthropy Europe Association (Philea)
- Network of European Foundations (NEF)
- European Venture Philanthropy Association (EVPA)
- Verband für Gemeinnütziges Stiften
- Verband österreichischer Privatstiftungen (VÖP)

== ERSTE Foundation Library ==
Founded in 2007, the ERSTE Foundation Library advances knowledge by building collections and providing open access to materials and information resources that support its projects. It contains around 12.000 items. Topics include art and media theory and history, minority and gender issues, cultural theory and policies, economic and political developments, social banking, innovation in foundations, philanthropy, demography, migration, education, and the art of memory. Geographically, the collection focuses on Central and South Eastern Europe. The Library is open to the public and free of charge.
