= Erste Group =

Austrian multi-national bank

Erste Group Bank AG

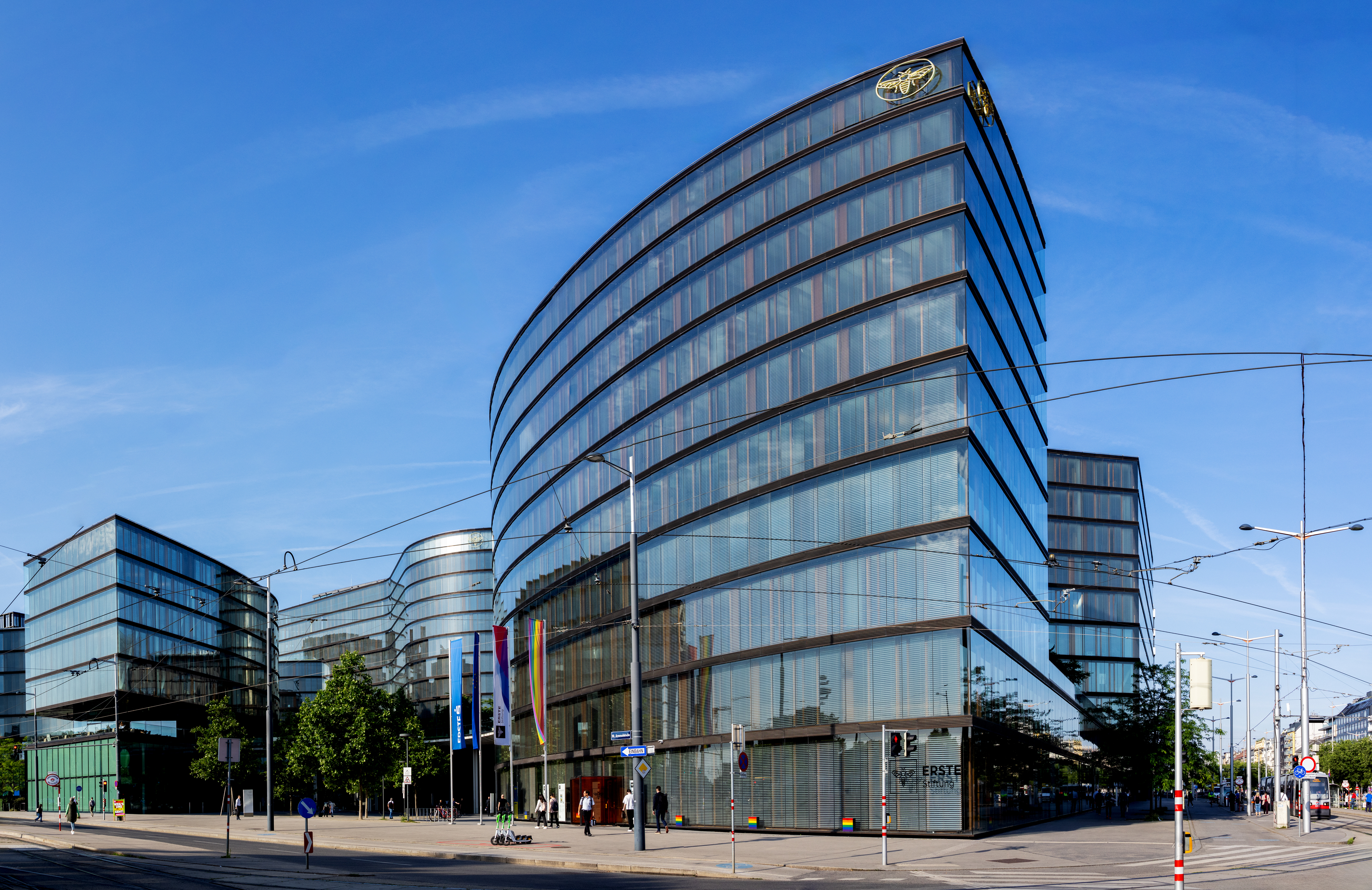
- Headquarters at Erste Campus
- Type: Public
- Traded as: WBAG: EBS; PSE: EBS; BVB: EBS; ATX Index component; PX Index component
- ISIN: AT0000652011
- Industry: Financial services
- Founded: 9 August 2008 (October 1819 as the first Austrian savings banks)
- Headquarters: Vienna, Austria
- Area served: Central and Eastern Europe
- Key people: Peter Bosek (CEO); Stefan Dörfler; Alexandra Habeler-Drabek; Maurizio Poletto
- Products: Retail and commercial banking; Investment and private banking; Asset management
- Operating income: €7.959 billion (H1 2026)
- Net income: €5.386 billion (H1 2026)
- Total assets: €461,137 billion (H1 2026)
- Total equity: €41.7 billion (H1 2026)
- Number of employees: 55,231 (H1 2026)
- Website: www.erstegroup.com

Erste Group Bank AG (shortened version Erste Group) is an Austrian financial service provider. It is one of the largest financial service providers in Central and Eastern Europe serving more than 23 million clients in over 2,000 branches in eight countries. Erste Group is headquartered in Vienna and operates as a universal bank.

Erste Group is the central entity of the Sparkassengruppe Österreich (Austrian Savings Banks Group) and the Österreichischer Sparkassenverband. It has been designated as a Significant Institution since the entry into force of European Banking Supervision in late 2014, and as a consequence is directly supervised by the European Central Bank. The main shareholder of Erste Group is the non-profit ERSTE Foundation.

In 1997, Erste Group went public and today the company is listed on the exchanges of Vienna, Prague and Bucharest and included in the indices CEETX, ATX and PX.

== History ==
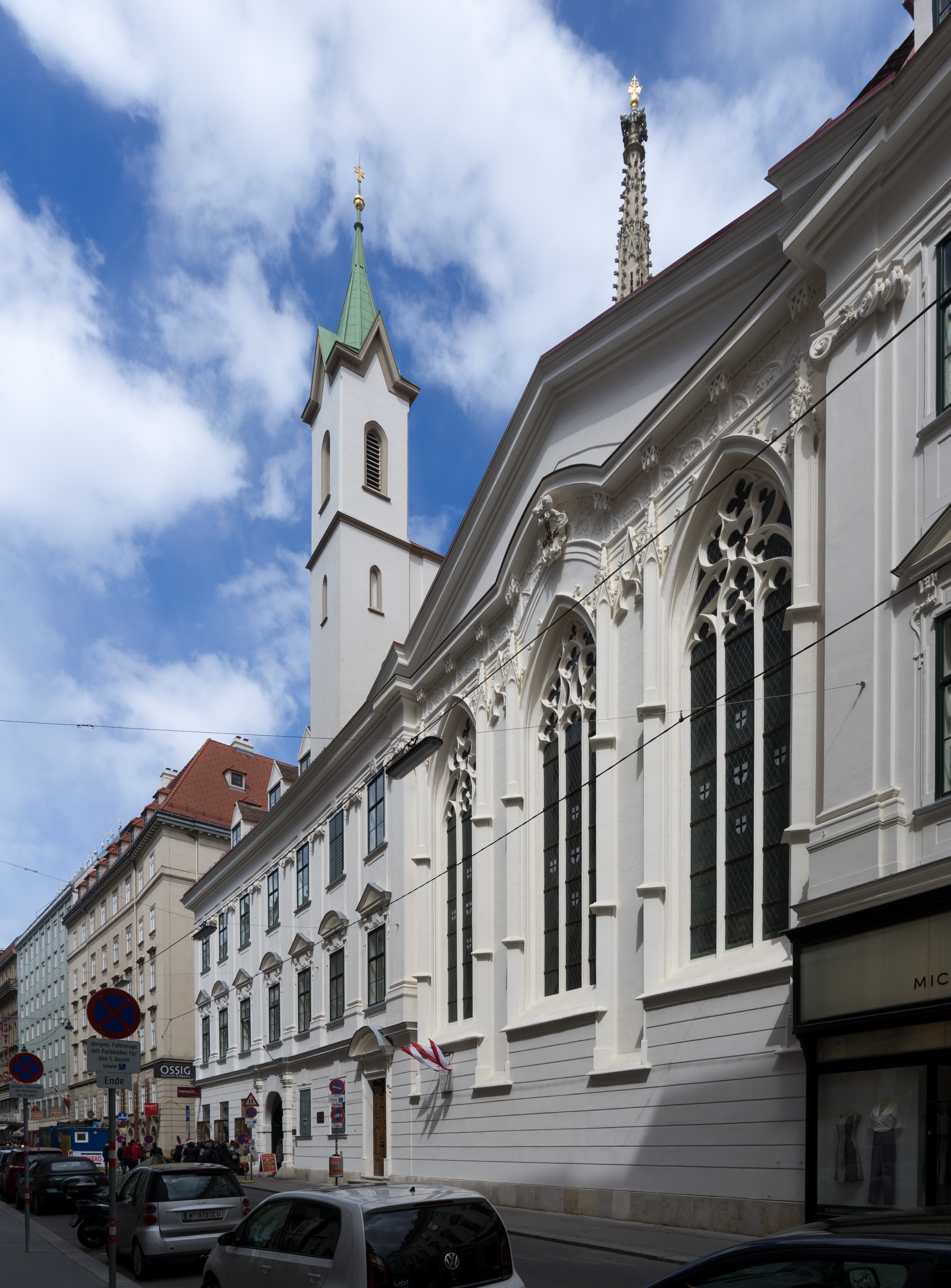
House of the Teutonic Order in Vienna, seat of the Erste österreichische Spar-Casse from 1821 to 1839

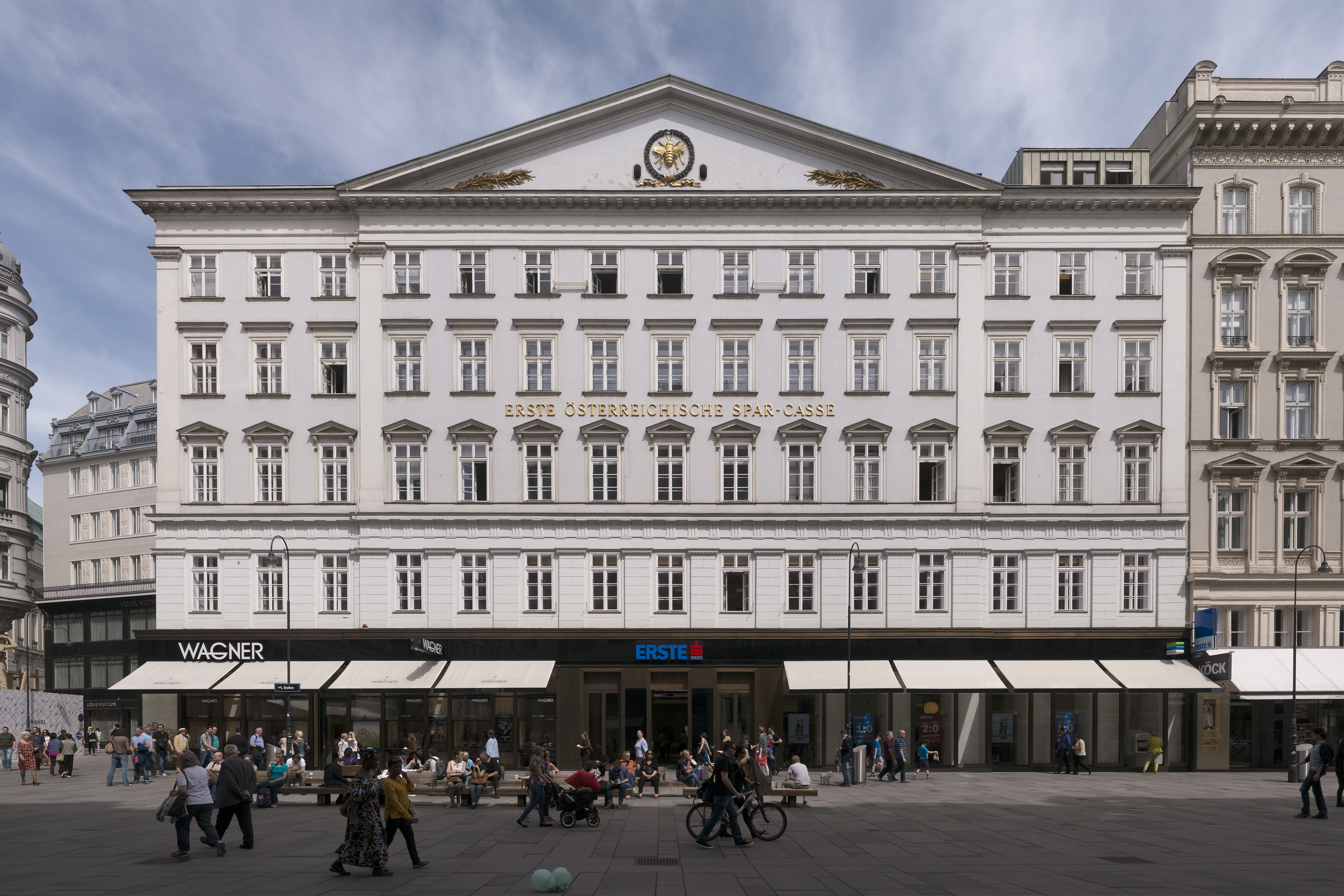
Building at Graben No.21 in Vienna, erected for the Erste Spar-casse in 1835-1838 on a design by Alois Pichl and seat of Erste Bank until moving to its new Erste Campus in 2015

The origins of Erste Group are in the founding of the Erste österreichische Spar-Casse in October 1819 in Leopoldstadt, a suburb of Vienna.

The IPO in Vienna in 1997 was conducted under the unified Erste Bank, which also handled subsequent capital increases until 2006. Some of these transactions were the largest of their kind ever executed in Vienna's financial market. The capital raised was used to finance Erste Bank's acquisitions in Central and Eastern Europe.

On 9 August 2008, the former Erste Bank Oesterreich was split up into the newly founded holding company Erste Group Bank AG and the subsidiary Erste Bank der österreichischen Sparkassen AG; the foreign subsidiaries were taken over by the new holding company. From then on, Erste Group included all companies of the group.

=== Effects of the financial crisis ===
In October 2011, Erste Bank said it expected a full year loss of up to EUR 1.1 billion, after writedowns and provisions of EUR 1.6 billion. This would be its first loss since at least 1988. It said the writedowns were due to government intervention in Hungary, where it was forced to take losses on Swiss franc mortgages, and a slower than expected recovery in Romania. In August 2013, Erste Group Bank AG was the first Austrian bank to fully repay the participation capital of EUR 1.76 billion issued in 2009 which consisted of EUR 1.22 billion from the Republic of Austria and EUR 540 million from private investors. From 2009 to 2012, the Republic of Austria received annual dividend payments from Erste Group of EUR 98 million and private investors of EUR 43 million. Including the pro rata dividend for 2013 which paid in June 2014 after the corresponding resolution is passed by the annual shareholders' meeting, the Republic of Austria received EUR 448 million and private investors EUR 198 million in dividends.

== Expansion into Central and Eastern Europe ==
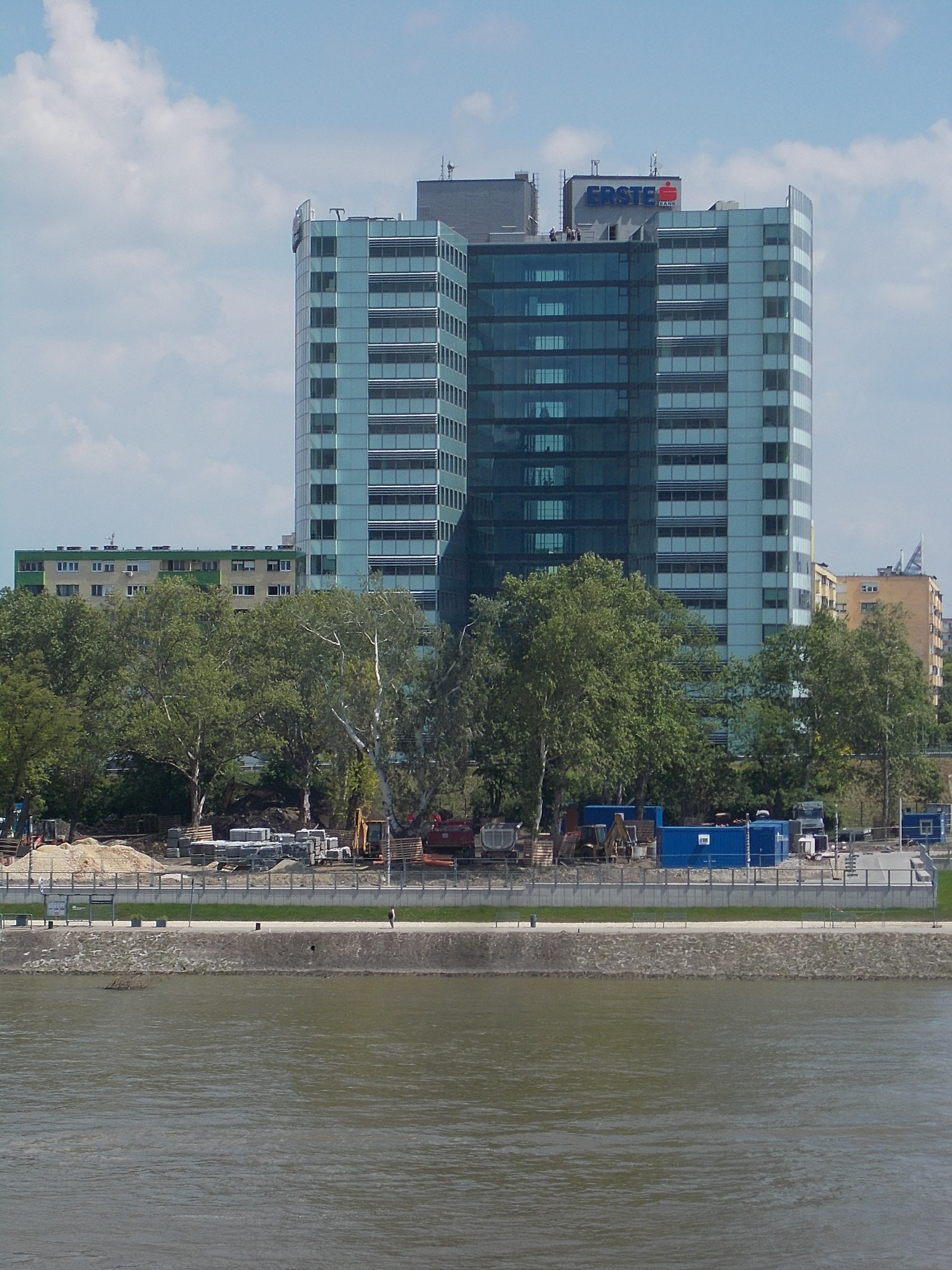
Europa Tower, seat of Erste Bank in Budapest

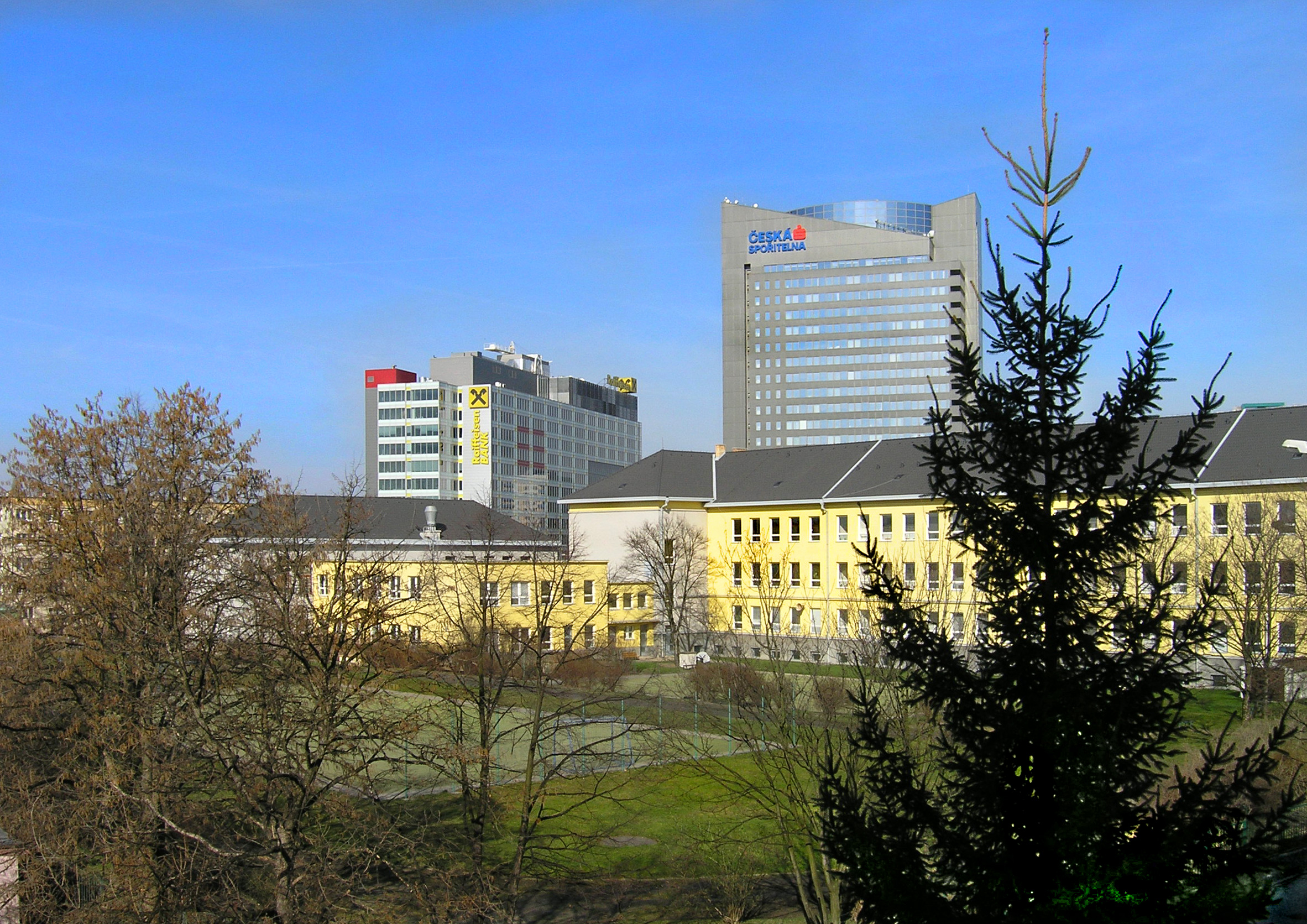
Česká spořitelna head office building in Prague

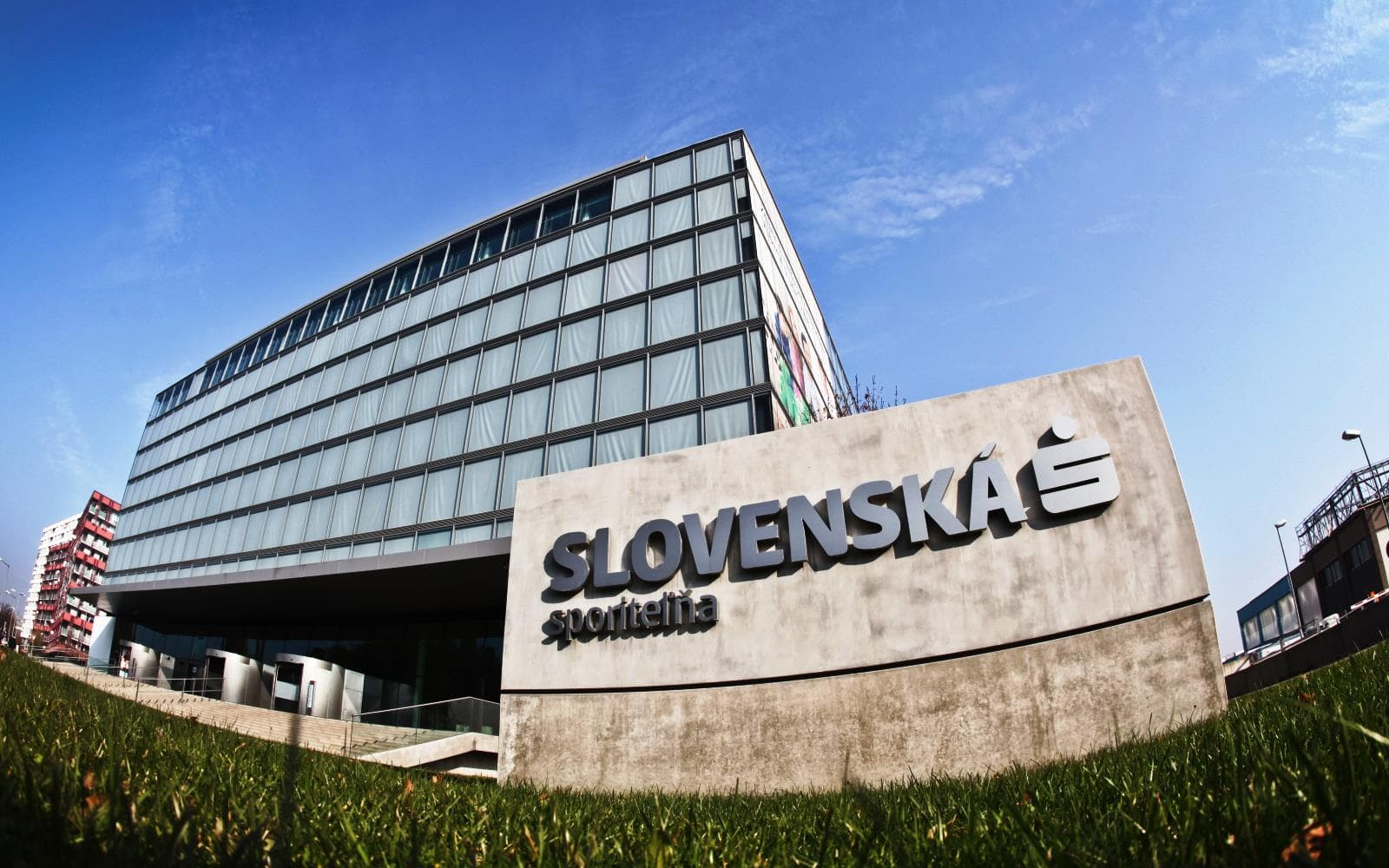
Slovenská sporiteľňa head office in Bratislava

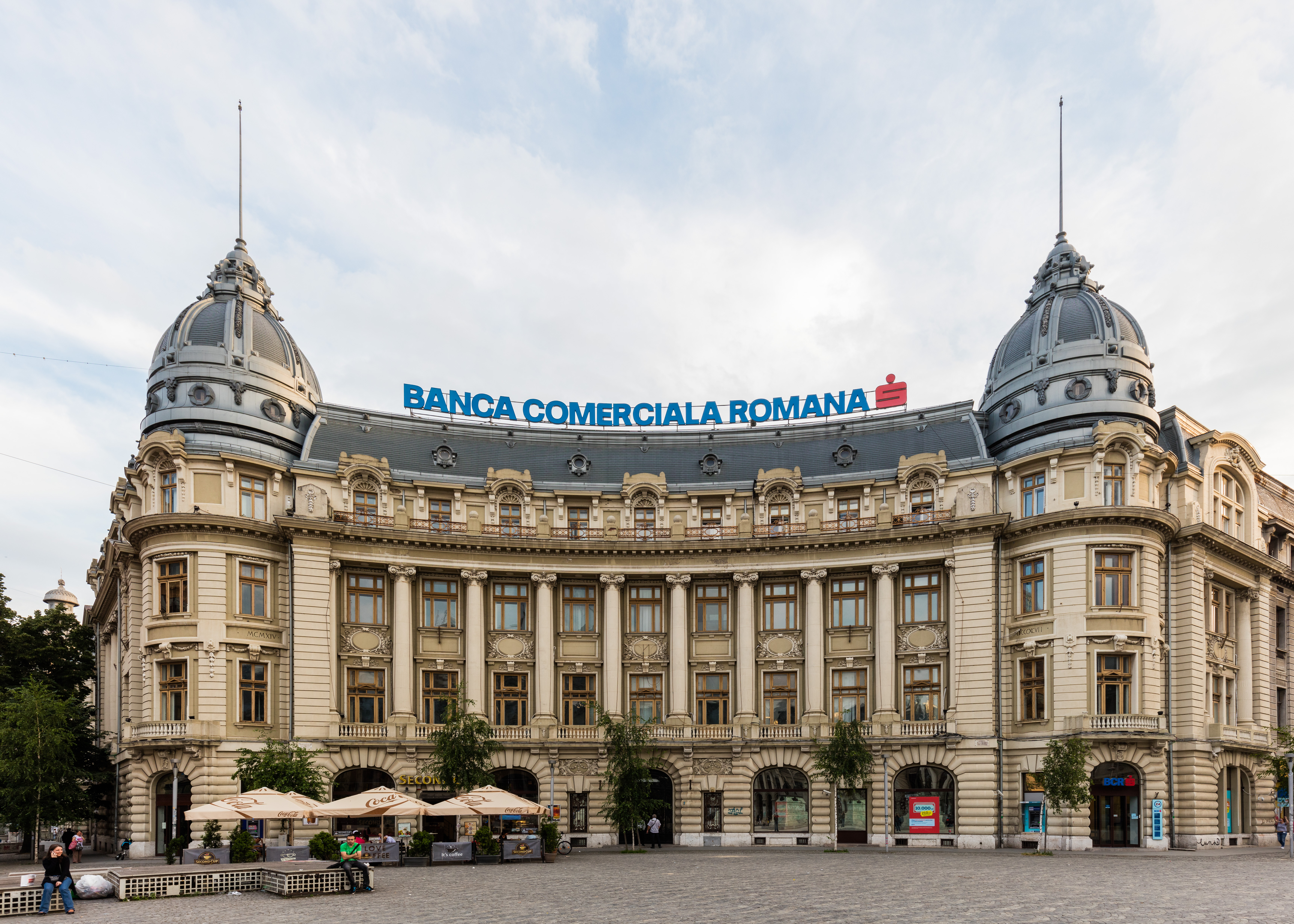
Banca Comercială Română head office building in Bucharest

=== Austria ===
In 1996, Salzburger Sparkasse was incorporated into the banking group. Shortly before the turn of the millennium, Sparkasse Oberösterreich took over all Upper Austrian branches from Erste Bank, whereupon 26% of the shares in the now largest federal state savings bank were gained. In 2000, Erste Bank acquired a 25% stake in the Steiermärkische Sparkasse. In December 2001, 51% of the Tiroler Sparkasse was obtained. In October 2007, shares in Bausparkasse der österreichischen Sparkassen were purchased; in 2021, the remaining shares were acquired.

In 2021, the Erste Bank Group still held 39.19% of the shares in Sparkasse Oberösterreich. By the beginning of 2024, the shares had fallen to 16.84%.

The shareholdings of Salzburger Sparkasse, Sparkasse Oberösterreich and Tiroler Sparkasse are still owned by Erste Bank, not Erste Group.

=== Hungary ===
The first takeover in Hungary was Mezőbank in 1997 (which was privatised by GiroCredit). It was renamed the following year to Erste Bank Hungary Zrt.

In 2003, the Hungarian Postabank was acquired, which merged with Erste Bank Hungary Zrt a year later. In December 2021, Erste Group announced that it will acquire 100% of the shares of the Hungarian Commerzbank Zrt.

=== Czech Republic ===
In 2000, majority stakes were acquired in the Czech Česká spořitelna (52% for EUR 530 million). Further shares were acquired in the following two years, with the result that 98% of the shares in the Czech credit institution were held at the end of 2002 and the total price of the acquisition increased to EUR 1.354 billion. The remaining shares were acquired in October 2018.

=== Slovakia ===
87.18% of the Slovak Slovenská sporiteľňa were acquired by Erste Bank in 2000 for EUR 425 million. In the same year, 20% of these shares were sold back to the Eastern European bank European Bank for Reconstruction and Development (EBRD), reducing the stake in SLSP to 67.2%. In April of the same year, the remaining 10% was acquired by the Slovakian state government. On 1 January 2005, the remaining 19.99% of SLSP was purchased by the EBRD.

=== Croatia ===
In 2000, three small Croatian banks (Bjelovarska banka d.d., Trgovačka banka d.d. und Čakovečka banka d.d.) were merged to create Erste & Steiermärkische Bank, following their takeovers as of 1997 by Erste Bank and Steiermärkische Bank und Sparkassen AG.

In 2003, the Croatian bank Riječka Banka was merged with Erste & Steiermärkische Bank. As of 2022, the Erste & Steiermärkische Bank d.d. is the third-largest bank in Croatia.

=== Poland ===
In May 2025, the Spanish lender Banco Santander Santander announced the sale of 49% of Santander Bank Polska to Erste Group. On 9 January 2026, Erste Group completed its purchase of the controlling stake in Santander Bank Polska and a 50% stake in the asset manager Santander TFI from Santander Group. On 24 April 2026, the bank was re-branded as Erste Bank Polska.

Erste Bank Polska SA is a Polish universal bank based in Wrocław, Poznań and Warsaw. It is the third largest bank in Poland in terms of assets value and the number of outlets. It was formed in 2001 by the merger of Bank Zachodni S.A. and Wielkopolski Bank Kredytowy SA.

=== Romania ===
The acquisition of 61.88% in Banca Comercială Română S.A. (BCR), the largest Romanian bank with 2.8 million customers and 12,000 employees, for EUR 3.751 billion in December 2005 was the largest foreign direct investment ever by an Austrian enterprise. Further shares in the Romanian bank were acquired in 2007 (7.2%) and 2012 (24%), and in June 2018 the stake held by Erste Bank increased from 93.58 % to 99.88 %. Banca Comercială Română has over 7,000 employees.

=== Serbia ===
In July 2005, Erste Bank signed the purchase agreement for the acquisition of 83.28% of the shares in Novosadska banka a.d., Novi Sad, from the Republic of Serbia. At the time of the purchase agreement, the Novosadska banka served 260,000 customers and employed 889 people.

The shares in the Serbian bank were increased from 83.3% to 95.6% in the fall of 2005, and 99.99% of the shares were held as of May 2006. In January 2006, Novosadska banka was renamed Erste banka Novi Sad.

=== Ukraine and other countries ===
In 2007, Erste Bank acquired 100% of Bank Prestige in Ukraine for EUR 79.4 million and renamed it Erste Bank Ukraine. In April 2013, Erste Group sold its Ukrainian subsidiary for around EUR 63 million to the owners of the Ukrainian Fidobank.

Furthermore, Erste Group Bank founded subsidiaries of savings banks and companies in Moldova (1998), Slovenia (1999 and 2006), Bosnia and Herzegovina (2006), North Macedonia (2008) and Montenegro (2009).

== Erste Group structure ==
Erste Group Bank AG is a public limited company that emerged from Erste Bank in 2008 and has since acted as a holding company for the Group's subsidiary banks in Austria and abroad. The bank is active in seven countries in Central and Eastern Europe, with its private and corporate customer business focusing on the eastern part of the European Union, including Austria.

The headquarters of Erste Group are located in Vienna. In addition, the banking group maintains branches in New York City, Hong Kong, Berlin and Stuttgart, which cover the lending business with foreign banks, leasing companies and sovereign borrowers as well as institutional sales.

Erste Group's shares are traded on the Vienna, Prague and Bucharest stock exchanges and are weighted in the CEETX, ATX and PX indices. As of June 2024, they are the most heavily weighted component of the ATX, which reflects the blue-chip segment on the Vienna Stock Exchange. Erste Group also holds 11.7% of the shares in the Vienna Stock Exchange.

=== Subsidiaries ===
Erste Group operates in Central and Eastern Europe through several subsidiaries

- Erste Bank der oesterreichischen Sparkassen (Austria)
- Erste & Steiermärkische Bank (Croatia)
- Erste Bank Hungary (Hungary)
- Česká spořitelna (Czech Republic)
- Erste Bank Polska (Poland)
- Banca Comercială Română (Romania)
- Erste Bank Novi Sad (Serbia)
- Slovenská sporiteľňa (Slovakia)

In addition to these core markets, Erste Group also has an indirect presence in Bosnia and Herzegovina (with Sparkasse Bank), in Montenegro (with Erste Bank Podgorica), in North Macedonia (with Sparkasse Bank AD Skopje) and in Slovenia (with Banka Sparkasse).

== Products ==
=== Online Banking George ===
In January 2015, Erste introduced its digital banking platform "George" in Austria. George was launched in Slovakia and in the Czech Republic in 2017, in Romania in 2018, in Croatia in 2020 and in Hungary in 2021. According to Erste Group, there were approximately 4 million George users in the first four markets by the end of 2018, more than 5 million in 2021, and about 10 million by the end of 2023.

=== Private banking ===
The Private Banking division serves private clients and offers them fund products. Customers can invest in private market ventures (private equity) with a starting capital of 50,000 EUR.

=== Social banking ===
Erste Group's social banking initiative came into being in 2006 with the founding of Die Zweite Sparkasse, offering people in financial need access to their own bank account and financial advise. In 2009, Erste Group founded a microfinance institution in Romania, which provides loans to rural entrepreneurs. Sinde 2016, social banking has been initiated in all core markets of Erste Group. As of April 2024, EUR 595.6 million in funding have been made available, creating or maintaining 100,000 jobs.

== Projects and initiatives ==
=== Headquarters Erste Campus ===
In the spring of 2016, 4.500 employees of Erste Group, of Erste Bank Oesterreich and their subsidiaries in Vienna moved to their new headquarters "Erste Campus". Construction had started on 26 June 2012. The headquarters are located on the site of the former Südbahnhof and was the first building complex of "Quartier Belvedere" that was completed. The new district is a mix of company buildings, apartments, parks, cultural spaces, shops and restaurants.

=== Other activities ===
In 2016, the Erste Financial Life Park (called Flip) was opened in Vienna with 1,500 m² of interactive exhibition space. Flip offers training courses on personal financial responsibility and debt prevention.

Erste Group is a partner of the annual European Forum Alpbach.

== See also ==
- List of banks in Austria
- List of banks in the euro area
