= Österreichischer Sparkassenverband =

Trade organization in Austria

The Österreichischer Sparkassenverband (ÖSPV) is the national representative body of the Sparkassengruppe Österreich, acting as a trade association.

== History ==
The first regional association of savings banks in Austria was created in 1899 in Lower Austria, followed by the other crown lands until all were covered by 1905. Also in 1905, the Reichsverband deutscher Sparkassen in Österreich was established in Vienna. It and operated under that name until Anschluss in 1938. It was reformed in 1946 as the Hauptverband der österreichischen Sparkassen, and adopted its current name in 2000. From 1947, it has been a sub-organization of the Austrian Economic Chamber.

== Overview ==
The Sparkassenverband is registered as an Austrian eingetragener Verein and is a member of the European Savings Banks Group and of the World Savings Banks Institute as well as the Deutsche Sparkassenstiftung für Internationale Kooperation.

It publishes a periodical every two months, Österreichische Sparkassen-Zeitung.

== Membership ==
The association's members are Erste Group Bank, Erste Bank Österreich, Die Zweite Sparkasse, 46 local savings banks outside of Vienna, and seven associations (German: Landesverband) that bring the former together on a regional basis. The "participation-managing savings bank" (German: Anteilsverwaltungssparkasse, Sparkassen foundations, the group audit organization (German: Prüfungsstelle), and the "Verbundpartner" are cooperation partners of the Sparkassenverband.

The seven regional associations (as of early 2024) are in Vienna (3 members, namely Erste Group Bank, Erste Group Österreich, and Zweite Sparkasse), Lower Austria (16 members), Upper Austria (9 members), Salzburg (2 members), Tyrol (8 members), Vorarlberg (5 members), Styria (4 members) and Carinthia (2 members).

== See also ==
- Deutscher Sparkassen- und Giroverband
