= Peter Bosek =

Austrian bank manager

Peter Bosek (born 5 June 1968 in Vienna, Austria) is an Austrian bank manager and has been a member of Erste Group Bank AG’s Management Board, with responsibility for retail banking, since January 2015.

== Education and career ==
Peter Bosek was born and grew up in Vienna, where he studied at the law faculty of the University of Vienna. After earning a doctorate in this field 1993, Peter Bosek worked as an assistant at the law faculty’s Institute of Constitutional and Administrative Law.

In 1996, he launched his banking career at Erste österreichische Spar-Casse, where he held a number of successive management functions, particularly in the areas of housing construction and real estate, as well as in handling the bank’s branch network. At the same time, Bosek continued to work as a lecturer in law at the University of Vienna between 1996 and 2005.

In 2007, Bosek joined the management board of Austria’s Erste Bank der österreichischen Sparkassen AG as the member responsible for the retail segment. His responsibilities as a board member were widened in 2010 to also include the fields of Corporates and Key Accounts. On 1 January 2015, he assumed the newly-created position of Chief Retail Officer on the management board of Erste Group Bank AG. In addition to overseeing the retail banking segment across Erste Group’s banking subsidiaries, this position also entails management responsibility for the banking group’s internal fintech Erste Hub and its digital innovation unit BeeOne, which are responsible for the development of “George”, Erste Group’s widely acknowledged digital banking platform.

Peter Bosek frequently serves as a speaker at financial services industry workshops and conferences, including recent speaker or panel member roles at Money 20/20 Europe, mobey forum, 4GameChangers and several Handelsblatt banking conferences. In addition to classical retail banking-related topics, Bosek's focus in such events tends to be on how digitalization is impacting the banking sector, as well as on the start-up economy.

In addition to his Erste Group functions, Peter Bosek also hold a supervisory board mandates at Wiener Städtische Versicherung AG Vienna Insurance Group.
