= Alois Pichl =

Austrian architect

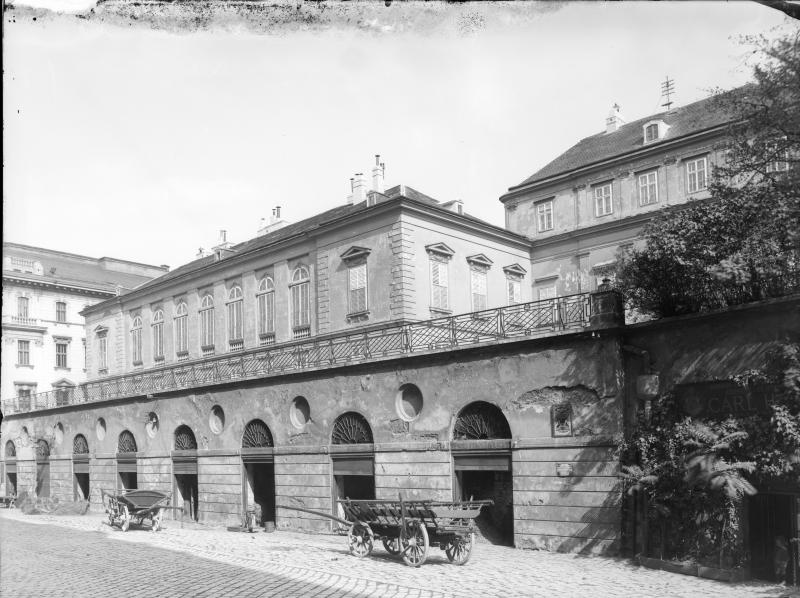
The Palais Modena in 1916

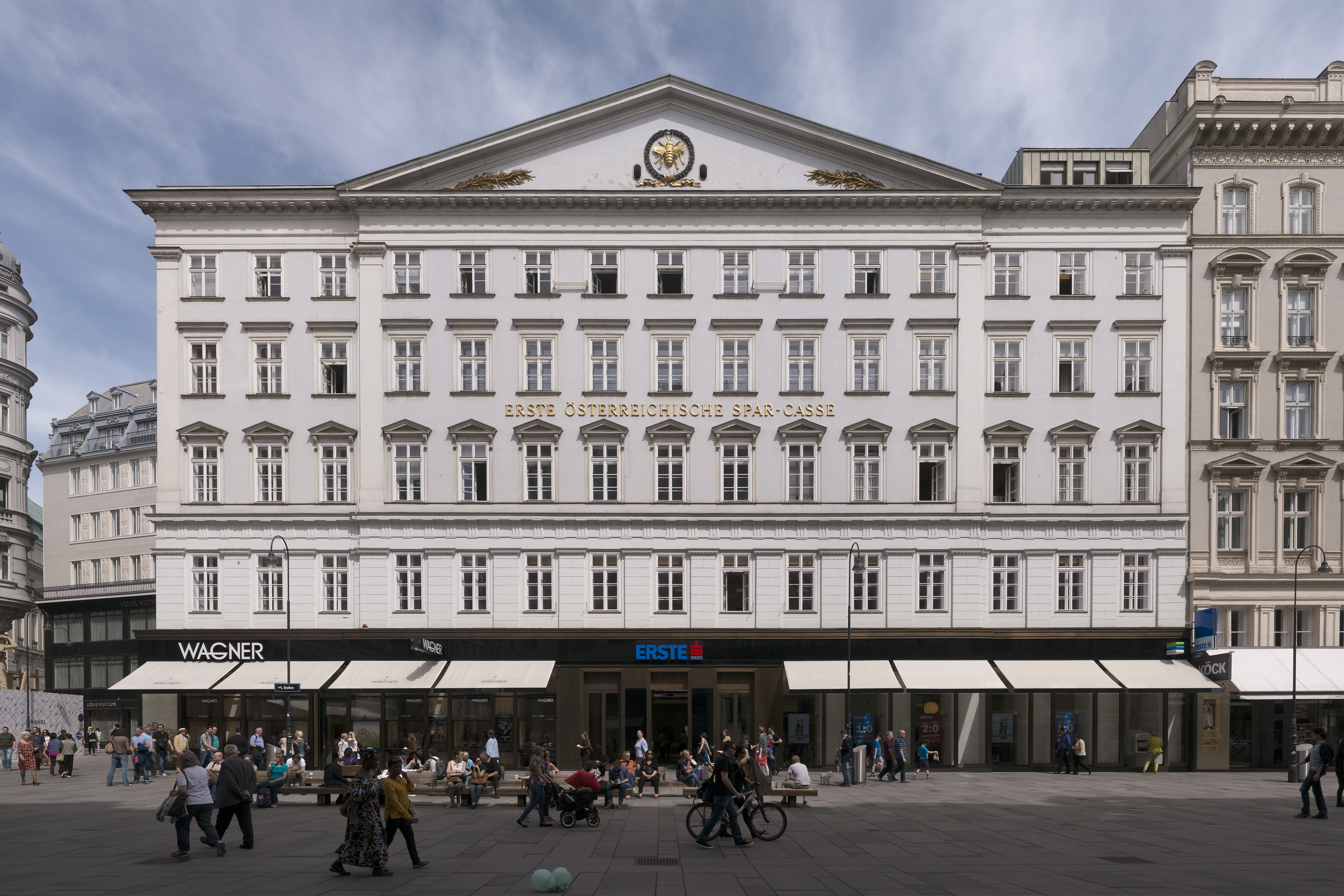
The Erste österreichische Spar-Casse in 2015

Alois Ludwig Pichl (1782, Milan - 19 May 1856, Vienna) was an Austrian architect. He worked mainly in Northern Italy, Vienna and Hungary for members of the House of Habsburg and other aristocrats. Some sources give his middle name as Luigi.

== Life and work ==
His father, Václav Pichl, was a violinist, composer and court music director in Milan, for Ferdinand Karl, Archduke of Austria-Este. His mother, Katharina, née Somogy de Koloszvar, came from a wealthy Hungarian family. His brother, Ferdinand Pichl (1775–1826), also became an architect. In 1809, he married Maria Anna Böhm (c. 1785-1856) and they had two daughters.

He began his architectural studies in Italy then, in 1802, enrolled at the Academy of Fine Arts, Vienna. That same year, he was awarded the Academy's Gundel-Prize for excellence as a student.

In 1803, he was hired as an architect by his father's former employer, Ferdinand Karl, and his wife, Maria Beatrice d'Este, Duchess of Massa, who were then residing in Vienna. From 1812, he was largely active in Hungary. His major project there came from János Graf von Keglevich de Buzin (1786–1856), for whom he worked on the Kistapolcsány Castle in Topoľčianky from 1818 to 1825. In Vienna, he created the Palais Modena (1811–1814) and the original building for the Erste österreichische Spar-Casse (1834–1835, now part of the Erste Group), as well as working on the new headquarters for the Niederösterreichischen Landhauses (1837–1839).

He was also a member of the Accademia di San Luca in Rome. In 1962 a street in Donaustadt was named after him.
