= Zentralsparkasse =

Former Austrian bank

Zentralsparkasse der Gemeinde Wien
- Native name: Zentralsparkasse der Gemeinde Wien
- Founded: 20 October 1905
- Defunct: 1991
- Fate: Merged
- Successor: Bank Austria
- Headquarters: Vienna, Austria
- Number of locations: 218 (1990)
- Area served: Austria

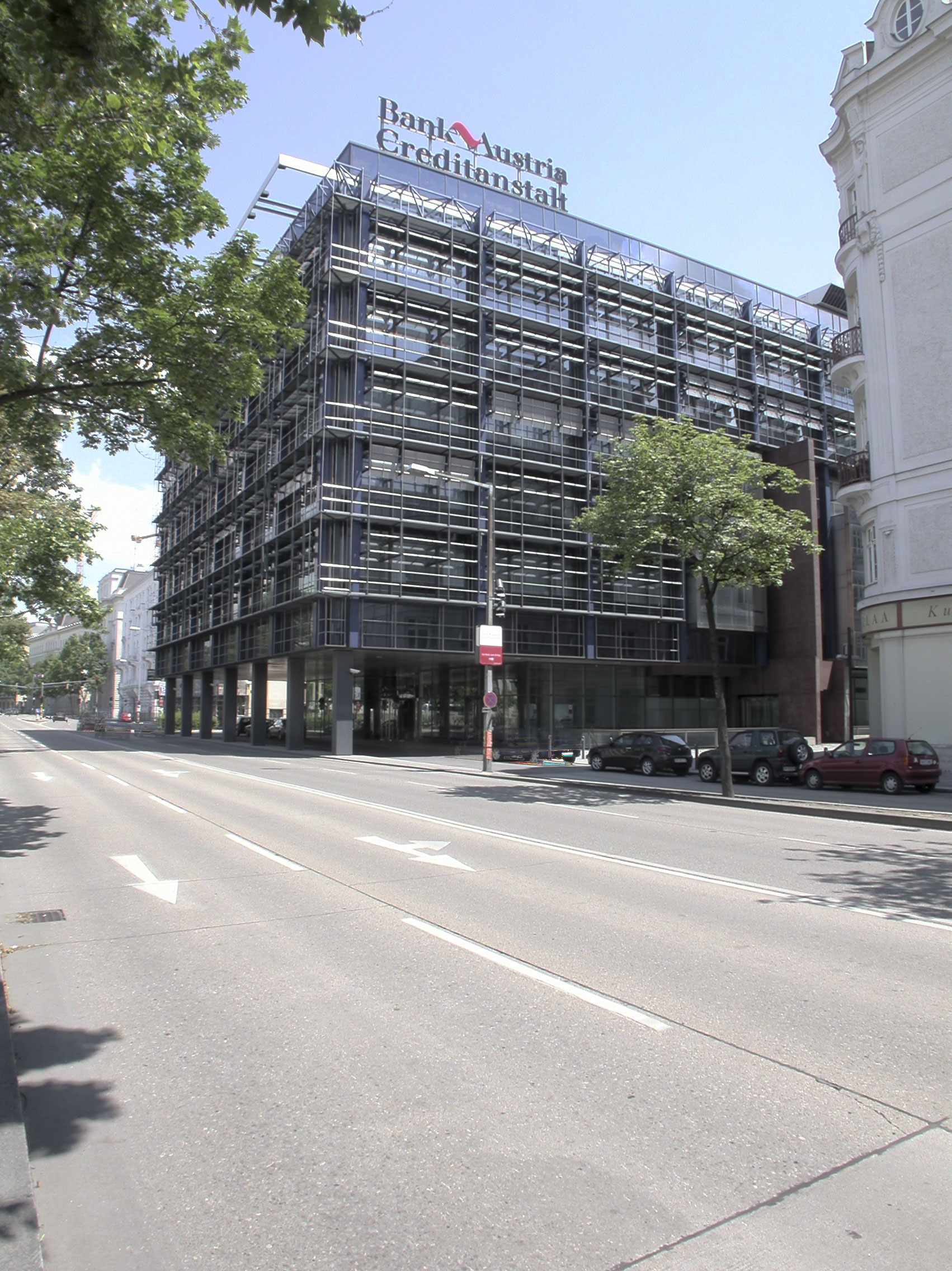
Former head office of the Zentralsparkasse at Vordere Zollamtsstraße 13, Vienna

The Zentralsparkasse, full name Zentralsparkasse der Gemeinde Wien (lit. 'Central Savings Bank of the City of Vienna') was a major bank in Austria. It was founded in 1905 and eventually merged in 1991 with the Austrian Länderbank to form Bank Austria, itself later integrated into UniCredit.

== Overview ==
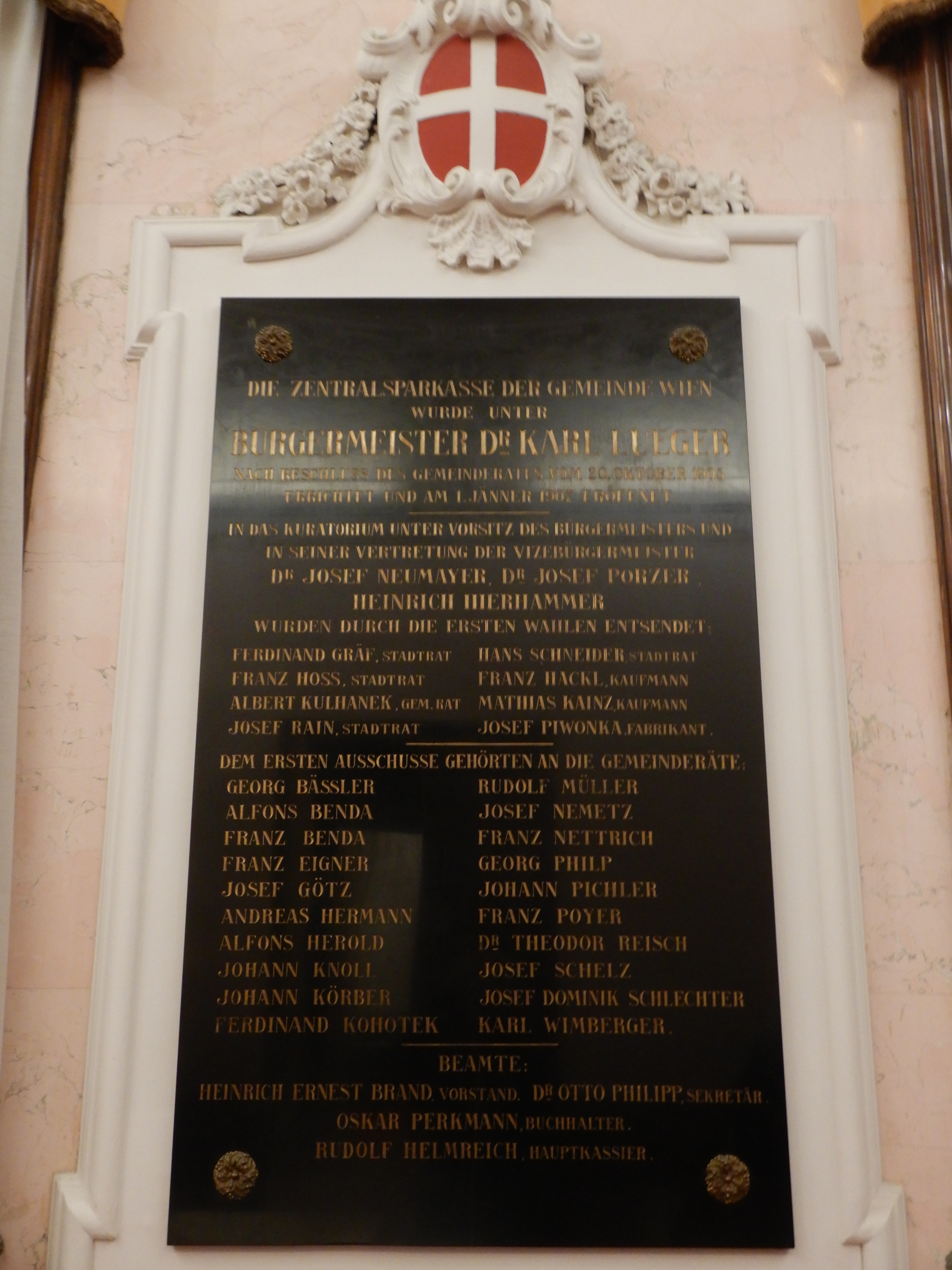
Foundation plaque of the Zentralsparkasse in Vienna's Old City Hall

On 20 October 1905, the Vienna City Council under Christian Social Mayor Karl Lueger made the decision to establish the Zentralsparkasse, following the development of municipal savings banks (German: Gemeindesparkassen) in Austria since the 1850s. Like with other similar entities, the city of Vienna was not formally the bank's owner but assumed liability for all its savings deposits and controlled its governance. The new institution immediately became a major competitor to the Erste österreichische Spar-Casse which had been the dominant savings bank in Vienna since 1819. One of the main drivers for its creation had been the expansion of the municipality of Vienna which had absorbed surrounding villages which had their own Gemeindesparkasse, an idea that had been debated since 1885. These included Sechshaus (savings bank est. 1881), Hernals (est. 1890), Währing (est. 1884) and Döbling (est. 1883), all of which were incorporated into Vienna in 1890-1892, as well as Floridsdorf (est. 1881) which was incorporated into Vienna in 1904-1905. After the creation of the Zentralsparkasse, these local savings banks continued to operate under the name Wiener Kommunalsparkasse in their respective districts, before fully merging into the Zentralsparkasse in 1923.

The Zentralsparkasse began operations on 2 January 1907 in the Old City Hall of Vienna, then permanently set up in a neighboring building at Wipplingerstrasse 4. In the first year, 30,000 accounts were opened with deposits of 14.7 million kronen. Like other savings banks the Zentralsparkasse experienced financial dislocation during the hyperinflation following World War I but sunsequently grew by taking over several smaller banks in Vienna. It was the key financier of the investments of the so-called Red Vienna municipal government from 1919 to 1934, under the aegis of City Councillor for Finance Hugo Breitner. Despite the politicization, it was very well managed and by late 1937 had become larger than the Erste Spar-Casse by total assets.

Following the Nazi Anschluss of 1938, the Zentralsparkasse kept expanding by taking over the local savings banks of Mödling, Liesing (savings bank est. 1897), Purkersdorf, and Klosterneuburg, after these localities had been incorporated into Greater Vienna in the fall of 1938.

After World War II, the Zentralsparkasse branded itself as "Z" and once again became the house bank of the social democratic municipal administration of Vienna. It played a significant role in the reconstruction of Vienna and from the 1960s onwards in the significant improvement in the living standards of broad sections of the population. Thanks to its scale, it often recorded higher profitability than commercial banks. In 1965, it relocated its head office to a purpose-built property at Vordere Zollamtsstraße 13, designed by architect Artur Perotti on the site of the former Bürgertheater which had been demolished in 1960. The building was extensively refurbished in 1988-1992 on a design by architects Günther Domenig and Peter Podsedensek.

In 1990, the Zentralsparkasse rebranded as Kommerzialbank Wien and was reorganized as a joint-stock company owned by an entity called Anteilsverwaltung Zentralsparkasse (AVZ). By then, it had 120 branches in Vienna and 98 in the rest of Austria, the largest branch network of all Austrian credit institutions. On 26 September 1991 it closed a merger with the struggling state-owned Länderbank, forming what was initially called Z-Ländebank Bank Austria AG on 5 October, with retroactive effect from 1 January 1991. AVZ became a main shareholder of Bank Austria, and was converted into a foundation in 2001. In 1994, Bank Austria's headquarters were relocated to a building at Lassallestrasse 5 in the Nordbahnhof neighborhood of Vienna, and the bank eventually left its former building on Vordere Zollamtsstraße in 2008.

== See also ==
- Sparkassengruppe Österreich
- List of banks in Austria
