= Tiroler Sparkasse =

- Type: Joint-stock company
- Industry: Financial services
- Founded: 1822; 204 years ago
- Headquarters: Innsbruck, Austria
- Products: Savings accounts
- Total assets: €3.84 billion (2018)
- Number of employees: 444 (2019)
- Parent: Sparkassengruppe Österreich
- Website: www.sparkasse.at

The Tiroler Sparkasse Bankaktiengesellschaft Innsbruck (known as Tiroler Sparkasse) is an Austrian savings bank that focuses on private customers, freelancers and small and medium-sized enterprises in the Tyrol region.

The bank was founded in 1822 and is part of the Austrian Sparkassengruppe Österreich. As of 2018 it held a leading position in its regional market with a market share of around 30% for private customers and almost 50% for corporate customers in the region with around 153,500 customers.

It is a member of the Austrian Savings Banks Liability Association, which guarantees the payment of customer deposits in excess of the legally guaranteed amount of €100,000.

== History ==
In 1822, during economically difficult years, Count Chotek and Felix Adam von Riccabona founded the "Sparkasse zu Innsbruck" as the first financial institution in Tyrol and the second oldest association savings bank in Austria. The aim was to encourage the building up of savings and financial provision for broad sections of the population and to use savings for economic development in the region. The city of Innsbruck provided the first business premises in the former town hall next to the city tower.

In 1822 the Sparkasse became a general savings institution and could thus be used by all sections of the population. Until then, this only applied to the socially and economically disadvantaged. In 1866 the institute moved to the Magistratsgebäude at Pfarrplatz 2, today's Domplatz. In 1877, the Sparkasse moved into its later property in Erlerstraße. In 1885 it was given the statutory name "Sparkasse der Stadt Innsbruck". The first World Savings Day was held in 1925. In the same year the first exchange office was opened in Maria-Theresien-Straße.

The main branch of the Tiroler Bauernsparkasse in Innsbruck merged with the Sparkasse of the city of Innsbruck in 1943. The Sparefroh was "born" in 1955. One year later the first branch was opened in Pradl. In 1974 a new seven-storey building was erected on Sparkassenplatz and was given the official address Sparkassenplatz 1. In 1975 it merged with the Sparkasse der Stadt Solbad Hall. The Sparkasse now bore the name Sparkasse der Stadt Innsbruck mit Sparkasse der Stadt Hall. The first ATM in Tyrol was opened in 1980 in the Sparkassen Arcade.

In 1982 the institute changed its name to Sparkasse Innsbruck-Hall, Tiroler Sparkasse. One year later the right to use the Tyrolean coat of arms was granted. Tirolinvest KAG was founded in 1988 as Tirol's only fund company. In 1990 the entire banking business of the Sparkasse was transferred to Tiroler Sparkasse Bankaktiengesellschaft Innsbruck. Erste Bank became the majority owner of Tiroler Sparkasse in 2001. Tiroler Sparkasse thus became part of Erste Group (with around 15.7 million customers). The Innsbruck branch of Die Zweite Sparkasse was opened in 2007. Tirolinvest KAG was merged with Erste-Sparinvest Kapitalanlagegesellschaft m.b.H. in 2017.

== Locations ==
In addition to its head office at Sparkassenplatz, the Tiroler Sparkasse has 26 branches and 25 self-service and ATM locations (mainly in the districts of Innsbruck-Stadt and Innsbruck-Land) as well as the wohn²Center at Sparkassenplatz 1.

== Ownership structure ==
On 31 December 2018 Erste Bank held a 74.98756% majority interest in Tiroler Sparkasse Bankaktiengesellschaft Innsbruck. The remaining 25.01244% are owned by the private foundation of Sparkasse Innsbruck-Hall, Tiroler Sparkasse.
