= Sparkassengruppe Österreich =

Savings banks network in Austria

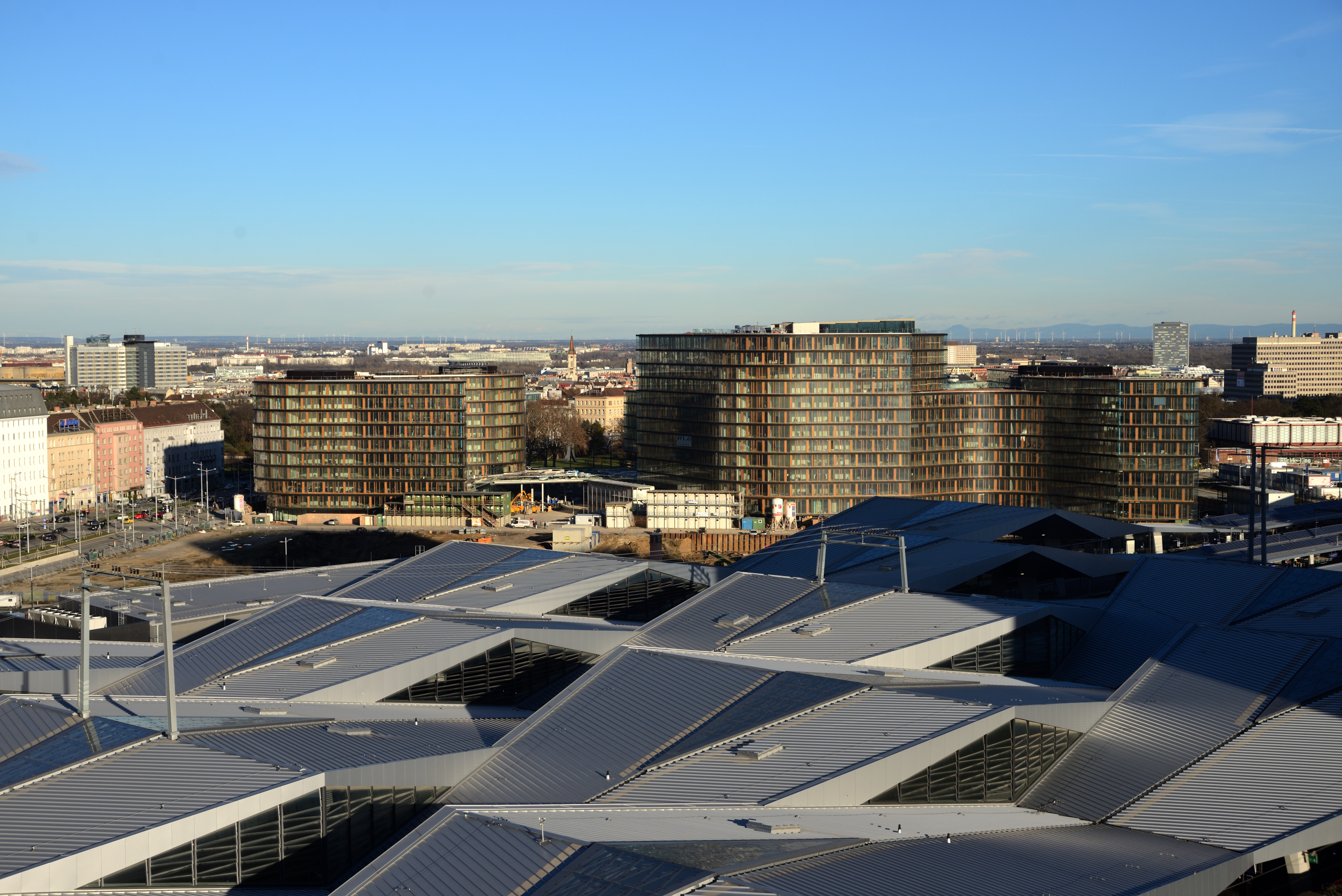
Erste Campus in Vienna, with Wien Hauptbahnhof in the foreground; since 2015 seat of Österreichischer Sparkassenverband, Haftungsverbund GmbH and Sparkassen-Haftungs GmbH as well as Erste Group Bank and Erste Bank Österreich

The Sparkassengruppe Österreich (lit. 'Austrian Savings Bank Group') brings together all savings banks (German: Sparkassen) in Austria. Tracing its origins to 1819, it serves around 4 million customers in 797 branches with more than 15,500 employees, with a customer share in Austria around 31.2% as of December 2022. The group has a complex decentralized structure but relies critically on Erste Group Bank AG, which owns the main local savings bank in Vienna, operates central functions, owns and manages subsidiaries outside of Austria, and consolidates group accounts. The Österreichischer Sparkassenverband acts as the group's national representative body.

In 2020 the group had total assets of €277 billion, ahead of Raiffeisen Bank International (€166 billion), UniCredit Bank Austria (€119 billion), and BAWAG Group (€53 billion), making it one of the largest Austrian banking groups. Since the entry into force of European Banking Supervision in late 2014, the entire Sparkassengruppe Österreich has been directly supervised by the European Central Bank, with Erste Group Bank AG as a consolidating entity.

The latter feature stands in contrast to Germany, where the Sparkassen are supervised individually as separate entities even though they are joined in an institutional protection scheme. Another difference is that the German Sparkassen-Finanzgruppe has no significant foreign operations, whereas Erste Group Bank AG has significant subsidiaries in Central and Eastern Europe.

== History ==
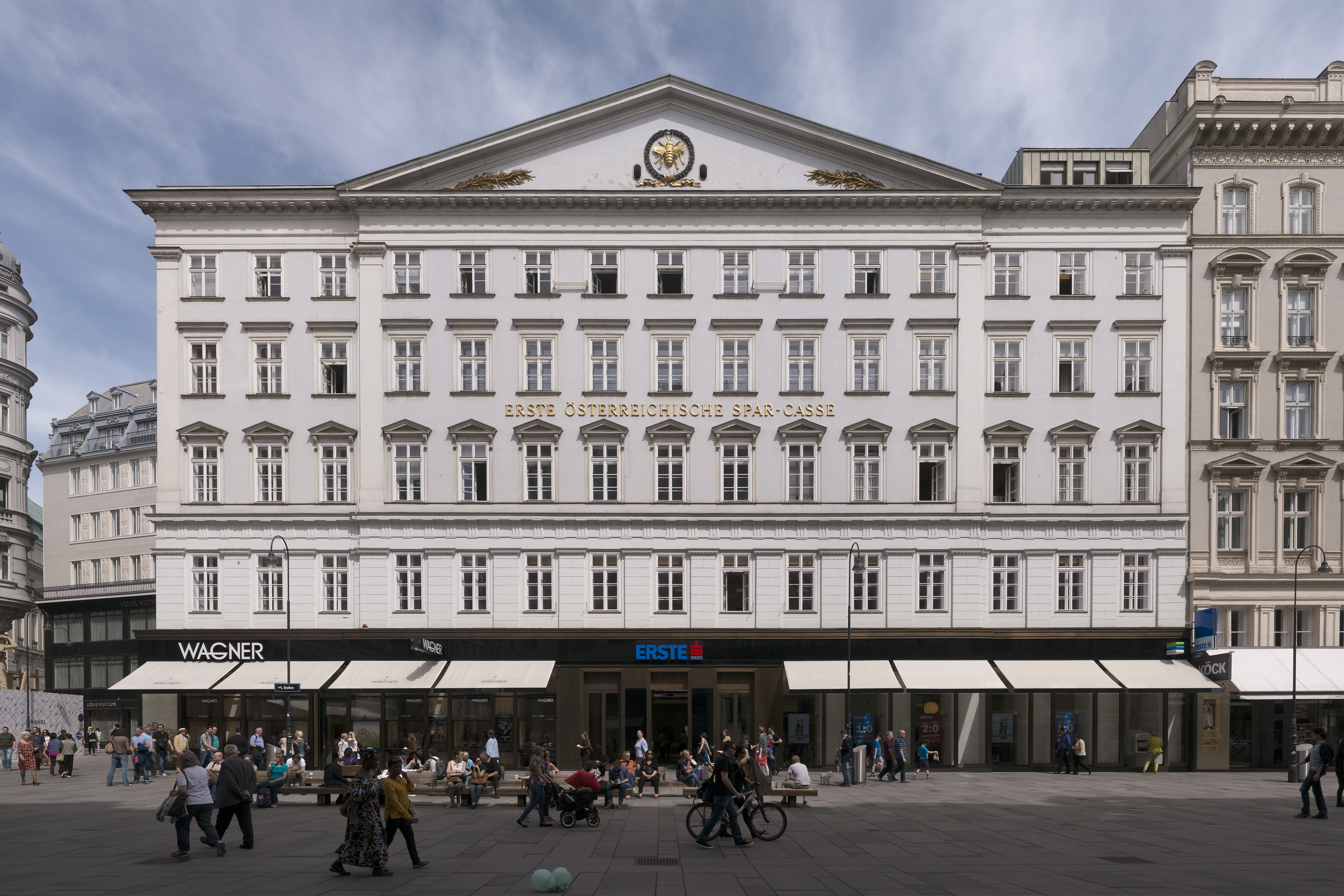
Building at Graben No.21 in Vienna, erected for the Erste Spar-casse in 1837-1839 on a design by Alois Pichl and seat of Erste Bank until 2015

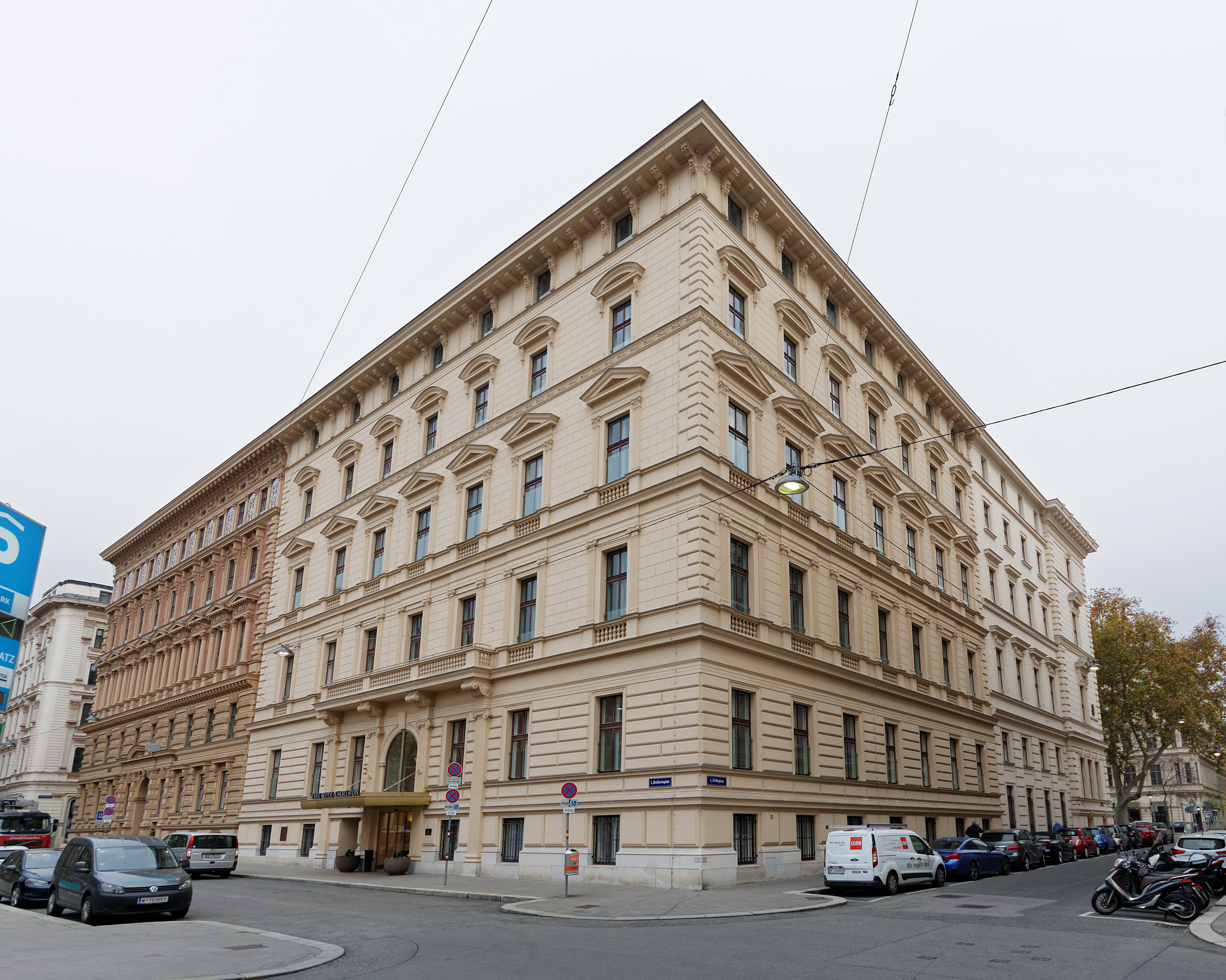
Palais Gutmann at Beethovenplatz 3 in Vienna, seat of the Girozentrale from 1939 to 1997, expanded to Beethovenplatz 2 (left) in 1969, and used by Erste Bank following the 1997 merger until 2005; repurposed in 2012 as the Ritz-Carlton Hotel Vienna

The first Austrian savings bank, as its name indicates, was the Erste österreichische Spar-Casse, which opened on 4 October 1819 in Vienna. Other savings banks were founded in subsequent years on an associative basis (German: Vereinssparkassen) by individuals such as aristocrats, clergy, senior civil servants, or doctors and pharmacists. As a counterweight to private banks, the savings banks were intended as purpose-driven institutions against the impoverishment of the population and as instruments for the accumulation of wealth by the working classes. The Savings Bank Regulation (German: Sparkassen-Regulativ) of 1844 established a framework of government oversight of the savings banks, with a permissive system for Vereinssparkassen and for the newly defined category of municipal savings banks (German: Gemeindesparkassen), the first one of which was born in 1853. A boom in new savings banks began in 1866, with the number increasing from 26 to 210 in 1910. The model statute of 1872 abolished the previous restriction of savings banks services to "less well-off classes" and the degressive interest rate (the interest rate fell with the level of deposits); they now became "financial institutions of a humanitarian nature" (German: Geldanstalten humanitären Charakters) that could do business with all classes of the population. Savings banks were created in other parts of the Habsburg Monarchy, such as the Laibacher Sparkasse in today's Ljubljana (est. 1820), Cassa di Risparmio di Venezia (est. 1822), Cassa di Risparmio di Milano (est. 1823), Böhmische Sparkasse (est. 1823), First National Savings Bank of Pest (est. 1840), and First Croatian Savings Bank in Zagreb (est. 1846).

A first central financial institution for the savings banks, initially joint with cooperative banks and with main geographical focus on Bohemia, was created in 1897 in Prague, the Deutsche Kreditgenossenschaft für Böhmen. It changed its name in 1901 to Centralbank der deutschen Sparkassen, and relocated to Vienna in 1916. It was liquidated in 1926.

The Austrian hyperinflation following World War I destroyed the value of both the assets and liabilities of the savings banks, whose aggregate deposits shrunk from 2 billion kronen (4.3 billion schillings) in 1913 to 3 million schillings in 1923. The disruption could only be overcome because the legislature allowed the savings banks to carry out new tasks, especially current account business and cashless payment transactions as well as foreign exchange and currency trading. After a brief period of prosperity after 1924, the savings banks again experienced stress around the banking crisis of 1931, but had been managed cautiously enough that, unlike most commercial banks, they withstood the dislocation following the crash of Creditanstalt; despite massive deposit withdrawals, no single savings bank failed or even suspended payments for a single day. At the end of 1937, there were 197 savings banks in Austria; almost half of their aggregate deposits were held in the two main Vienna savings banks, Zentralsparkasse (the Viennese Gemeindesparkassen, with 588 million schillings in total assets) and Erste Bank (the original Vereinssparkassen, with 416 million).

Between 1938 and 1945 under Anschluss, the Austrian savings banks adopted some features of the German system including the creation of the Girozentrale der ostmärkischen Sparkassen. In 1939, the Girozentrale der Ostmärkische Sparkassen was established as a centralizing organization for the German savings banks along similar lines to the German Girozentralen that had been created in the previous four decades.

=== Since World War II ===
After the currency stabilization in 1952, the savings bank system underwent its most successful phase to date, with extremely high growth rates, although there were also strong government restrictions to combat inflation until the 1970s. In 1957, the Girozentrale was restructured from its Anschluss-era legal form under public law to a joint-stock corporation, the Girozentrale der Österreichische Sparkassen AG, subsequently renamed Girozentrale und Bank der österreichische Sparkassen AG in 1965. In 1979, through the Banking Act and the Savings Banks Act, the savings banks were placed on an equal footing with other credit institutions, which meant a significant expansion of their scope of business. Volunteers were replaced on savings bank boards by full-time executives, and most state regulations were phased out. At the same time, the branch network and the associated number of employees kept expanding. In order to offer all financial services, numerous subsidiaries in the insurance, leasing and investment sectors were founded. There were also two major waves of mergers, with a significant reduction in the number of savings banks from 162 in 1979 to 128 in 1983 and 74 in 1994.

The Austrian savings banks sector underwent major structural change in the 1990s. Following new legislation in 1986, many savings banks transferred their operations to joint-stock subsidiaries, which allowed the latter to raise external equity capital. In 1990–1991, the country's largest savings bank, Vienna's Zentralsparkasse, acquired the state-controlled Länderbank and renamed itself Bank Austria. Also in 1991, the Girozentrale purchased a retail bank, the Österreichisches Credit-Institut, and renamed itself the GiroCredit Bank der Sparkassen in 1992. In 1994, Bank Austria took over control of GiroCredit, but in 1997 it absorbed Creditanstalt-Bankverein and moved decisively away from the savings banks market, selling GiroCredit to the Erste Österreichische Spar-Casse. The latter merged with GiroCredit and took the name Erste Bank der oesterreichischen Sparkassen AG, in short Erste Bank, thenceforth the savings banks' dominant financial institution.

In 2001, the savings banks agreed to form a Haftungsverbund or mutual support pact, which was later designated as an institutional protection scheme (IPS) under EU law. In 2003, the ERSTE Foundation was created and became Erste Bank's parent entity. Meanwhile, the group expanded to 12 Eastern and Southeastern European countries.

Erste Group Bank was founded in 2008 to serve as holding company, fully owning Erste Bank in Austria (now known as Erste Bank Österreich) and also owning the group's foreign operations. As of the end of 2022, the ERSTE Foundation controlled 24.2 percent of the capital of Erste Group Bank, whose equity is publicly listed and otherwise largely dispersed.

== Member savings banks ==
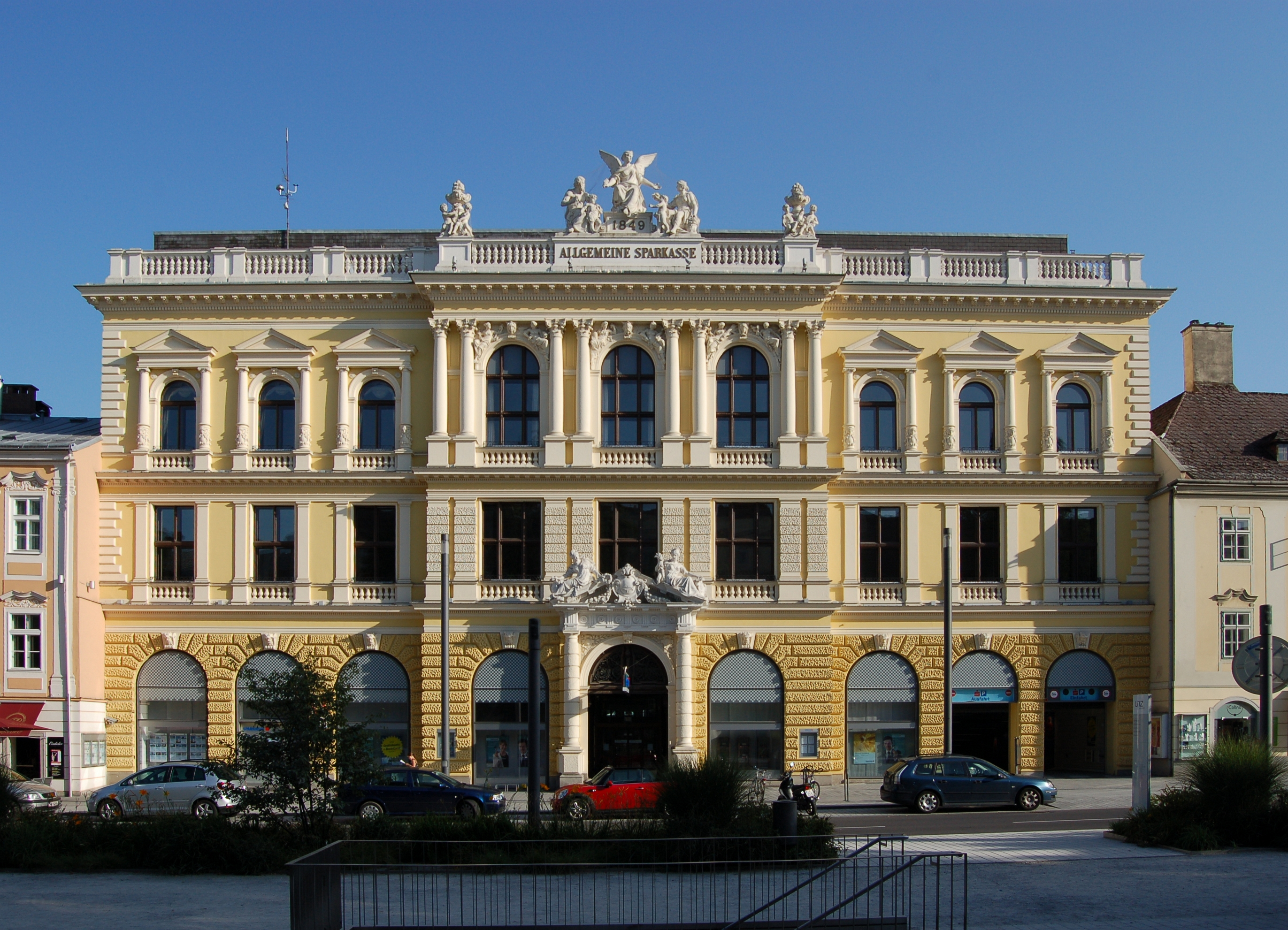
Building of the Allgemeine Sparkasse Oberosterreich in Linz

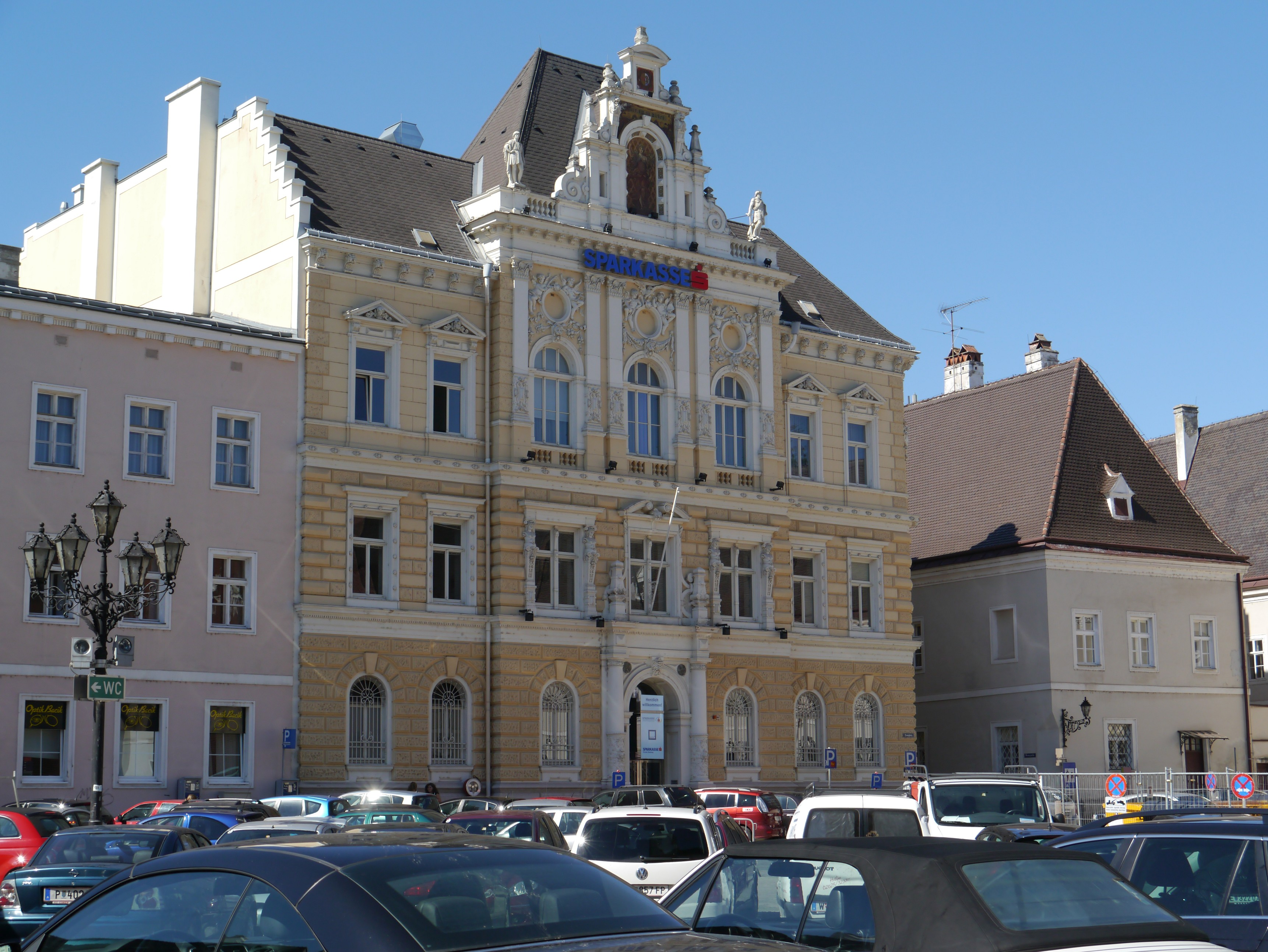
Building of the Sparkasse Niederösterreich Mitte West in Sankt Pölten

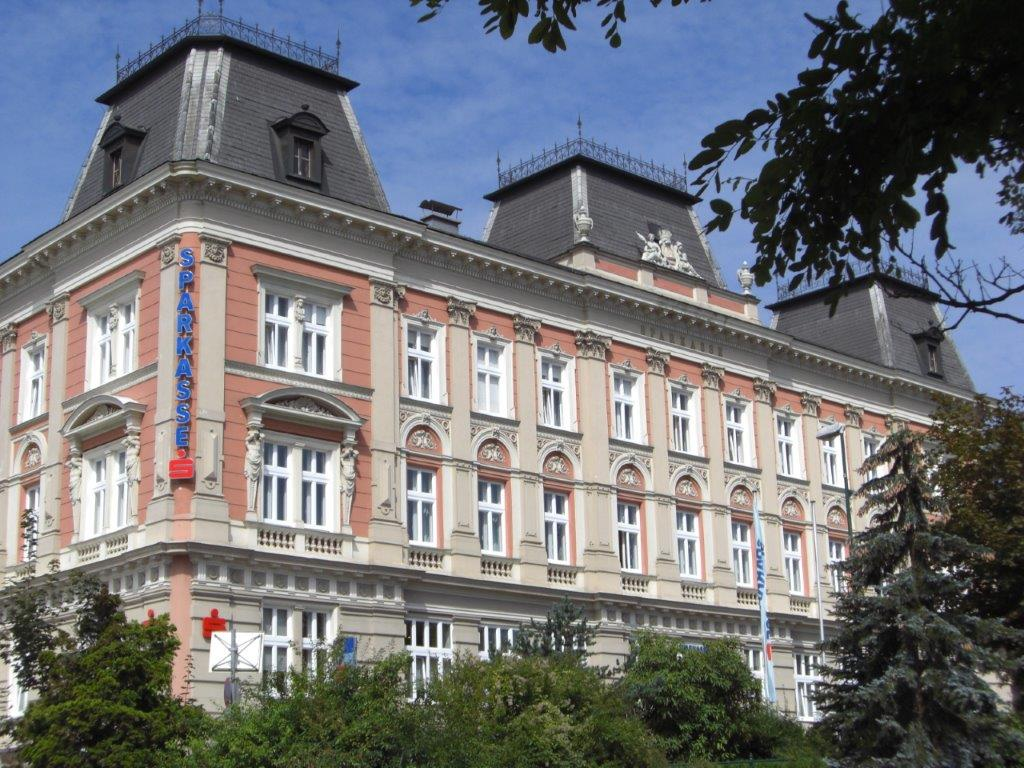
Sparkasse building in Lambach

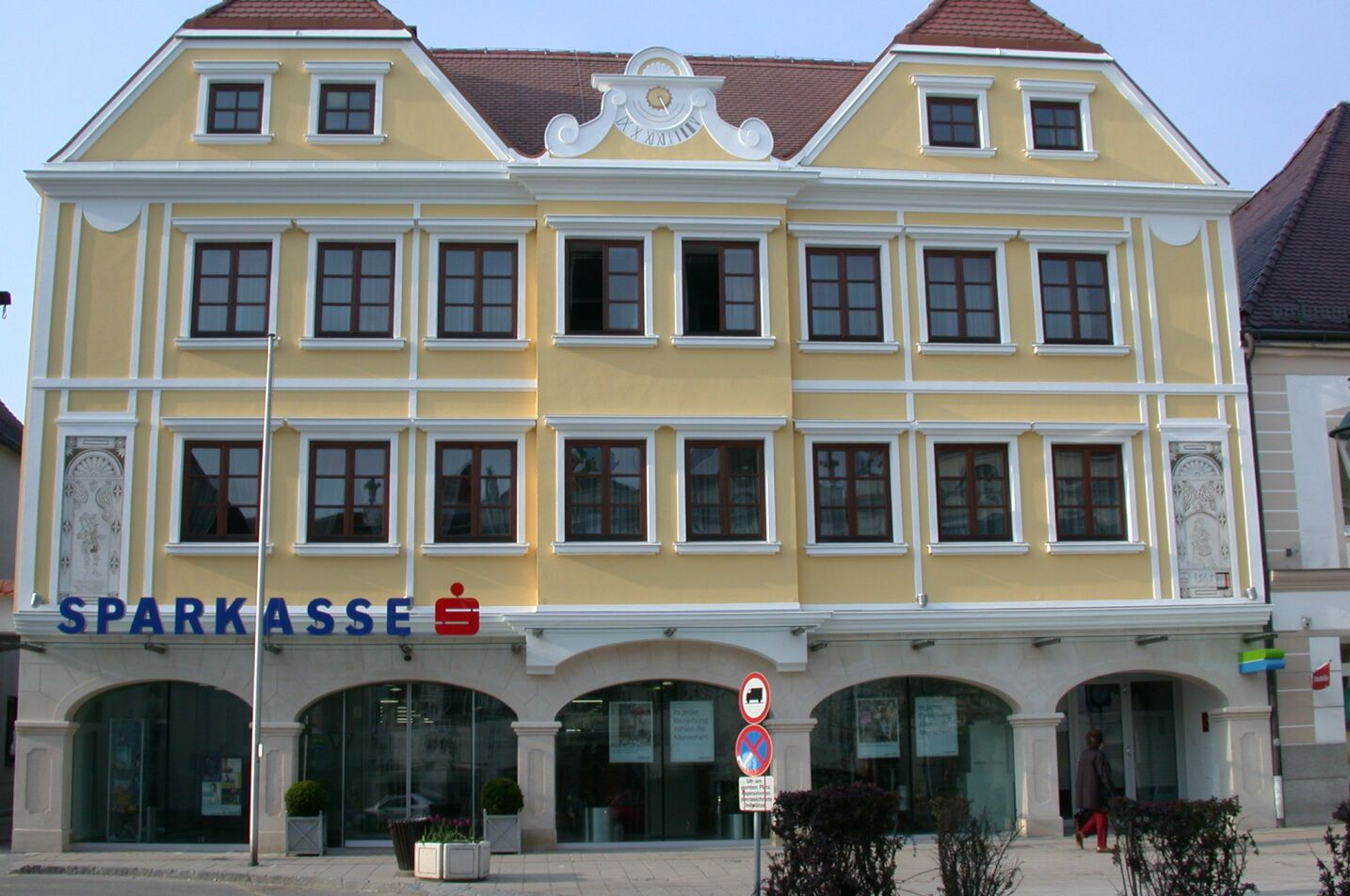
Sparkasse building in Horn

The savings banks that form the Sparkassengruppe Österreich are Vienna-based Erste Bank Österreich (an AG since 1993), 46 local savings banks outside of Vienna, Die Zweite Sparkasse, as well as Bausparkasse der österreichischen Sparkassen AG (also known as sBausparkasse), a mortgage bank established in 1941.

Outside of Vienna, the 46 local savings banks extant as of early 2024 are, by chronological order of creation (of the oldest entity in cases of subsequent mergers):

- Tiroler Sparkasse in Innsbruck (Vereinssparkasse est. 1822, AG since 1990)
- Sparkasse Bregenz in Bregenz (Vereinssparkasse est. 1822, now AG)
- Steiermärkische Sparkasse in Graz (Vereinssparkasse est. 1825, AG since 1991)
- Kärntner Sparkasse in Klagenfurt (Vereinssparkasse est. 1835, AG since 1990)
- Sparkasse der Stadt Feldkirch in Feldkirch (Vereinssparkasse est. 1842)
- Allgemeine Sparkasse Oberosterreich in Linz (Vereinssparkasse est. 1849, AG since 1990)
- Sparkasse Niederösterreich Mitte West in Sankt Pölten (Vereinssparkasse est. 1854, AG since 2000)
- Salzburger Sparkasse in Salzburg (Vereinssparkasse est. 1855, now AG)
- Kremser Bank in Krems (Vereinssparkasse est. 1856, AG since 1992)
- Waldviertler Sparkasse in Zwettl (Gemeindesparkasse est. 1856, now AG)
- Sparkasse Scheibbs in Scheibbs (Gemeindesparkasse est. 1858, AG since 2002)
- Sparkasse Poysdorf in Poysdorf (Gemeindesparkasse est. 1860, AG since 2000)
- Wiener Neustädter Sparkasse in Wiener Neustadt (Vereinssparkasse est. 1860)
- Sparkasse Lambach in Lambach (Gemeindesparkasse est. 1861, now AG)
- Sparkasse Horn-Ravelsbach-Kirchberg in Horn (Gemeindesparkasse est. 1862, AG since 1990)
- Sparkasse Salzkammergut AG in Bad Ischl (Gemeindesparkasse est. 1863, AG since 2002)
- Sparkasse Eferding-Peuerbach-Waizenkirchen in Eferding (Vereinssparkasse est. 1864)
- Sparkasse Ried-Haag in Ried im Innkreis (Gemeindesparkasse est. 1866)
- Dornbirner Sparkasse in Dornbirn (Gemeindesparkasse est. 1867, AG since 2002)
- Sparkasse Hainburg-Bruck-Neusiedl in Hainburg (Gemeindesparkasse est. 1867, now AG)
- Sparkasse Baden in Baden (Vereinssparkasse est. 1868)
- Sparkasse Voitsberg-Köflach in Voitsberg (Gemeindesparkasse est. 1868, AG since 1992)
- Sparkasse Korneuburg in Korneuburg (Gemeindesparkasse est. 1869, AG since 2008)
- Sparkasse Mürzzuschlag in Mürzzuschlag (Gemeindesparkasse est. 1869, AG since 2001)
- Sparkasse Mühlviertel-West in Rohrbach (Gemeindesparkasse est. 1869, now AG)
- Sparkasse Herzogenburg-Neulengbach in Herzogenburg (Vereinssparkasse est. 1870, AG since 2014)
- Sparkasse Langenlois in Langenlois (Vereinssparkasse est. 1871)
- Sparkasse Neunkirchen (Niederösterreich) in Neunkirchen (Vereinssparkasse est. 1871)
- Sparkasse Pöllau in Pöllau (Gemeindesparkasse est. 1872, AG since 2003)
- Sparkasse Schwaz in Schwaz (Vereinssparkasse est. 1872, now AG)
- Sparkasse der Gemeinde Egg in Egg (Gemeindesparkasse est. 1873)
- Sparkasse Pottenstein N.Ö. in Pottenstein (Vereinssparkasse est. 1873)
- Sparkasse der Stadt Amstetten AG in Amstetten (Gemeindesparkasse est. 1874, now AG)
- Sparkasse Feldkirchen/Kärnten in Feldkirchen (Vereinssparkasse est. 1874)
- Sparkasse Haugsdorf in Haugsdorf (Vereinssparkasse est. 1874)
- Sparkasse Kufstein in Kufstein (Vereinssparkasse est. 1877)
- Lienzer Sparkasse in Lienz (Vereinssparkasse est. 1878, AG since 2003)
- Sparkasse Imst in Imst (Vereinssparkasse est. 1882, now AG)
- Sparkasse Bludenz in Bludenz (Gemeindesparkasse est. 1892, AG since 2004)
- Sparkasse Frankenmarkt in Frankenmarkt (Gemeindesparkasse est. 1894, AG since 1991)
- Sparkasse Mittersill in Mittersill (Gemeindesparkasse est. 1894, AG since 2002)
- Sparkasse Pregarten-Unterweißenbach in Pregarten (Gemeindesparkasse est. 1895, AG since 2003)
- Sparkasse der Stadt Kitzbühel in Kitzbühel (Gemeindesparkasse est. 1899)
- Sparkasse Neuhofen in Neuhofen (Gemeindesparkasse est. 1900, now AG)
- Sparkasse Rattenberg in Rattenberg (Gemeindesparkasse est. 1910, now AG)
- Sparkasse Reutte in Reutte (Gemeindesparkasse est. 1917, AG since 2006)

Die Zweite Sparkasse (full name Die Zweite Wiener Vereins-Sparcasse) is a Vereinssparkasse created in 2006 by the ERSTE Foundation in Vienna. It relies on volunteer work from employees of the other Sparkassengruppe entities.

Erste Bank Österreich is wholly owned by Erste Group Bank, and in turn owns stakes in Salzburger Sparkasse (100 percent, as of end 2022), Tiroler Sparkasse (75 percent), Sparkasse Hainburg-Bruck-Neusiedl (75 percent), Sparkasse Mittersill (40 percent), Steiermärkische Sparkasse (25 percent), Kärntner Sparkasse (25 percent), Allgemeine Sparkasse Oberösterreich in Linz (19 percent), Sparkasse Voitsberg-Köflach (4 percent) as well as sBausparkasse (100 percent). It has no equity stake in the other local Austrian savings banks.

The local savings banks in Austria are governed by private-sector law, unlike most of their German counterparts which are public-law organizations (Anstalt des öffentlichen Rechts). Since 1986, they have had the option of transferring their business operations to a subsidiary joint-stock corporation (German: Aktiengesellschaft, AG), whereas the prior entity would retain its savings bank status as a "participation-managing savings bank" (German: Anteilsverwaltungssparkasse, AVS). From early 1999, AVSs have been allowed to convert into a foundation (German: Stiftung). As of early 2024, 33 local savings banks operated as AG, 13 savings banks had retained their prior status (i.e. no joint-stock entity), of which 10 Vereinssparkassen and 3 Gemeindesparkassen. Following mergers and other transactions, the joint-stock savings banks may have multiple shareholders including AVSs and foundations.

The local savings bank and Vienna-based Erste Bank Österreich do not compete in retail services within each other's territorial remit, thus operating under a de facto "regional principle" (German: Regionalprinzip) similarly to the German Sparkassen-Finanzgruppe, even though an earlier mandatory Regionalprinzip was abolished by the 1979 savings bank legislation. The Zweite Sparkasse has operations in all of Austria except Vorarlberg, however.

== Group-level arrangements and deposit guarantee ==
The Sparkassen-Haftungs GmbH (or S-Haftungs GmbH) operates the deposit guarantee scheme of the Sparkassengruppe, which is separate from the other Austrian deposit insurance systems. It was established in 1988 as a corporate entity, and was recognized in January 2019 by the Austrian Financial Market Authority as a mandatory deposit guarantee scheme in line with Austrian and EU legislation. Under Austrian law, the Sparkassengruppe deposit guarantee scheme may be called to intervene if the other two schemes, the uniform Einlagesicherung Austria (ESA) and that of the Raiffeisen Banking Group, are depleted; conversely, the two other schemes may protect savings banks' depositors if the Sparkassengruppe scheme becomes depleted. The Austrian state may intervene if all three schemes are depleted.

Because of the scheme's mandatory character and public guarantees, S-Haftungs GmbH has been classified as part of the Austrian government sector by Eurostat for national accounts purposes, despite misgivings from Sparkassengruppe representatives.

The joint liability scheme (German: Haftungsverbund, also referred to as "cross-guarantee scheme") relies on a separate entity, Haftungsverbund GmbH. It overlaps, but does not coincide, with the institutional guarantee scheme, which relies on an "ex-ante fund" managed by a jointly owned entity, IPS GesbR. As an exception to the Haftungsverbund, the Allgemeine Sparkasse Oberösterreich in 2009 secured a trilateral cross-guarantee agreement with Erste Group Bank and Erste Bank Österreich. As of August 2022, Haftungsverbund GmbH's shareholders were Erste Bank Österreich (51 percent) and Erste Group Bank AG (1 percent), the rest being held by local savings banks including those for Styria (12.7 percent), Upper Austria (8 percent), Salzburg (3.2 percent) and Carinthia (2.8 percent). In total, Erste Group controls 64 percent of Haftungsverbund GmbH directly or indirectly, and likewise with Sparkassen-Haftungs GmbH.

The Haftungsverbund replaced an earlier regime of guarantee of the municipal savings banks (Gemeindesparkassen) by the relevant municipalities, which had been established by law in 1929 but was gradually phased out from 2003 onwards at the request of the European Commission. The Vereinssparkassen did not benefit from similar guarantees before the creation of the Haftungsverbund.

== Auditing ==
In accordance with Austrian savings bank legislation, the Sparkassengruppe relies on an in-house auditor, the Sparkassen-Prüfungsverband (also known as the Prüfungsstelle), jointly with an external audit firm.

== See also ==
- Raiffeisen Bank International
- Sparkassen-Finanzgruppe in Germany
- List of banks in Austria
- List of banks in the euro area
