= Allgemeine Sparkasse Oberosterreich =

Austrian bank

- Native name: Allgemeine Sparkasse Oberösterreich Bankaktiengesellschaft
- Industry: Financial services
- Founded: 1849
- Headquarters: Linz, Austria
- Services: Banking
- Website: www.sparkasse.at/oberoesterreich/privatkunden

Allgemeine Sparkasse Oberosterreich is a bank based in Austria. Its head office is situated at Linz, Upper Austria.

In August 2015, the bank acted as one of the lead managers in the $613.5 million loan securing by the Türk Ekonomi Bankası in an international syndicate of 32 more banks.

== See also ==
- Sparkassengruppe Österreich
- List of banks in Austria
