= Steiermärkische Sparkasse =

Austrian sparkassen or savings bank

Coordinates: 47°04′09″N 15°26′13″E

- Company type: Joint-stock company
- Industry: Financial services
- Founded: 1825; 201 years ago
- Headquarters: Graz, Austria
- Total assets: €16 billion (2018)
- Number of employees: 2,785 (2018)
- Parent: Sparkassengruppe Österreich
- Website: www.sparkasse.at

The Steiermärkische Bank und Sparkassen (Steiermärkische Sparkasse for short) is an Austrian sparkassen or savings bank based in Styria. It is a universal bank with services for private clients, small and medium-sized enterprises, private banking clients, large companies, institutional clients and the public sector. It is the largest retail bank in Styria. The expanded home market includes Austria, Macedonia, Bosnia and Herzegovina, Montenegro, Croatia, Serbia and Slovenia.

Steiermärkische Sparkasse is the largest regional Sparkasse in Austria and an important part of the Sparkassengruppe Österreich, which consists of 46 Sparkassen with Erste Group Bank and Erste Bank Österreich as leading institutions. It is also a member of the Sparkassen Haftungsverbund, the group's mutual protection arrangement.

== History ==
Steiermärkische Sparkasse was founded in 1825 as Vereinssparkasse (Steyermärkische Spar-Casse) and is thus the oldest financial institution in Styria. Business operations began on 15 May 1825 at the first business premises at Landhaus, Schmiedgasse No. 9. The actual founder of the Steiermärkische Sparkasse was the Emperor's personal representative and Governor in Styria: Franz von Hartig. Since 1823 he had been the Imperial and Royal Count of Styria, Governor of Styria and thus head of the Imperial and Royal Styrian Gubernium, the country's highest political authority. In addition to his political responsibilities, he also was in a role inspired him to found a Sparkasse in Graz. Since 1823 he had been a member of the Association of the First Austrian Spar-Casse with direct insight into the beginnings of the Sparkassen system in Austria. As early as 1824 he had decided to found an institute of this kind in Styria as well.

=== Timeline ===
- On 12 February 1825 the subscribers decided to establish a "Steyermärkische Spar-Casse zu Gratz" and its statute and elected its first organs.
- On 2 March 1825 the statutes were approved by the Gubernium for Styria (Zl. 4840) and the members of the permanent committee were elected.
- On 5 May 1825, by decree of the United Court Chancellery in Vienna, permission was granted to operate this first financial institution in Graz.
- On 15 May 1825 at 10 o'clock in the morning the opening took place in the rooms of the business premises at the Landhaus.
- The first client was the protector of the Sparkasse, Count von Hartig, who paid an amount of 100 fl. C.M. with a dedication.
- The first employees of the Sparkasse were Peter Lingl (cashier) and Ignaz Dissauer (accountant). However, their previous employer Carl Freiherr von Mandell continued to pay their salary.
- On 24 March 1838 Archduke John of Austria visited the Sparkasse accompanied by the Minister of State Count von Kolowrat.
- On 1 April 1885 the Steiermärkische Sparkasse moved into their new premises, built according to plans by Matthias Seidl, in which the (older) Stephaniensaal was also built and made available to the public.
- The Steiermärkische Sparkasse in Graz emerged from "the transfer of the Sparkasse des Bezirks Umgebung Graz and the Gemeinde-Sparkasse in Graz to the old Steiermärkische Sparkasse by universal succession in 1939".
- From 1965 expansion in Styria -– acquisition of 20 Sparkasse
- In 1991 it was incorporated into a Joint-stock company.
- 1992 Merger of Steiermärkische Sparkasse and Steiermärkische Bank
- From 1997 Expansion in the Western Balkans, including Erste & Steiermärkische Bank in Croatia
- 2000 Takeover of Erste Bank branches in Styria

== Structure ==
Steiermärkische Bank und Sparkassen AG has its headquarters at Am Sparkassenplatz in Graz. 73.5% of the shares in the company are held by "Steiermärkische Verwaltungssparkasse", 25% by "Erste Bank" and 1.5% by the employees.

As of 2008 Steiermärkische Sparkasse had a balance sheet total of EUR 15.7 billion, the Steiermärkische Sparkasse Group is the largest Sparkasse in southern Austria. The Sparkasse employs 2,785 staff and operates 233 locations. (as of 2018)

== Debanking ==
- In 2017, the Steiermärkische Sparkasse terminated the bank account of the Identitarian Movement in Austria due to the groups’ campaign against refugees crossing the Mediterranean from North Africa to Europe.
- In December 2024, the Austrian public broadcasting company ORF reported that the Steiermärkische Sparkasse had terminated the bank account of the right-wing Freilich Magazin. The Freilich Magazin described the termination of their bank account as an "attack on journalism and on freedom of speech".

== Literature ==
- Wilhelm Kaiserfeld and Heinrich Poschacher, Die Steiermärkische Sparkasse 1825–1925. Eine Denkschrift anlässlich ihres hundertjährigen Bestandes, Graz 1925
- Werner Rauchenwald: Banken in Graz; Leykam-BranchenverlagsgmbH (Hrsg.) 2007
