= Die Zweite Sparkasse =

Austrian bank in Leopoldstadt district, Vienna

Die Zweite Wiener Vereins-Sparkasse
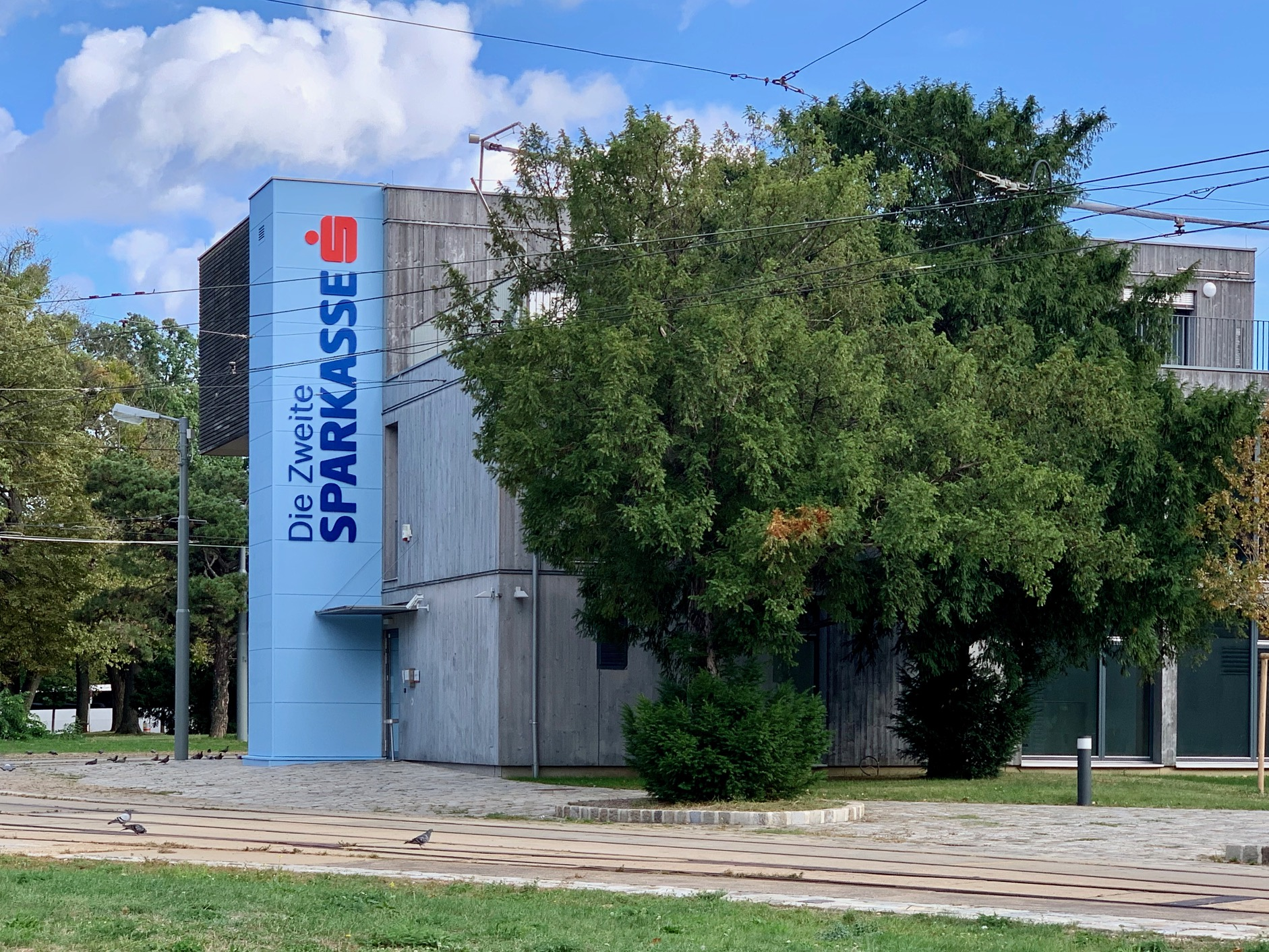
- Founded: 2006
- Headquarters: Vienna, Austria
- Total assets: € 12.4 million (2018)
- Number of employees: 340 (2018)
- Website: www.sparkasse.at

Zweite Wiener Vereins-Sparkasse (abbreviated: Zweite Sparkasse, also: Die Zweite) is an Austrian bank based in Vienna's Leopoldstadt district (2nd municipal district). It is a socially oriented bank ran exclusively by volunteers from Erste Bank and the Sparkassen group, and does not aim for any profits.

== History ==
The Zweite Sparkasse was founded on the initiative of and with funds from the ERSTE Foundation. The Articles of Association dated 15 May 2006 were adopted at the founding meeting and approved by the Financial Market Authority in September of the same year. On 21 October 2006, the incorporation under company law was entered in the Commercial Register of the Commercial Court of Vienna. On 21 November 2006, the first branch in Vienna-Leopoldstadt, which is also the company's headquarters, was opened in the presence of Federal President Heinz Fischer.

On 4 October 2006 the Zweite Sparkasse commenced operations and registered its first customers. At the end of 2007, the Zweite Sparkasse had around 1,300 customers with around 1,800 accounts in three branches and 268 volunteers' workers. At the end of 2017, the number of clients had grown to around 8,000 customers throughout Austria.

In line with the business model, around 4,000 Zweite clients have so far been successfully transferred to other banks.

=== Branch history ===
In addition to their main branch at the company's headquarters in Vienna Zweite Sparkasse operates branches in seven provincial capitals run in cooperation with volunteers from the associated savings banks of the federal provinces:

- October 2006 main branch in Vienna-Leopoldstadt (Erste Bank)
- September 2007 in Innsbruck (Tiroler Sparkasse)
- November 2007 in Salzburg (Salzburger Sparkasse)
- February 2008 in Klagenfurt (Kärntener Sparkasse)
- May 2008 in Graz (Steiermärkische Sparkasse)
- October 2009 in Villach (Kärntener Sparkasse)
- January 2011 in Linz (Allgemeine Sparkasse Oberösterreich)

In the provinces of Lower Austria and Burgenland, Die Zweite Sparkasse is represented in the so-called correspondent banking system. Individual branches of regional savings banks provide customer service for Die Zweite:

- May 2008: Sparkasse Wiener Neustadt became a correspondent bank in Lower Austria.
- November 2009: Erste Bank and Sparkasse Hainburg-Bruck-Neusiedl became correspondent banks in Burgenland.
- May 2011: Erste Bank St. Pölten also became a correspondent bank in Lower Austria.

== Description ==
=== Services ===
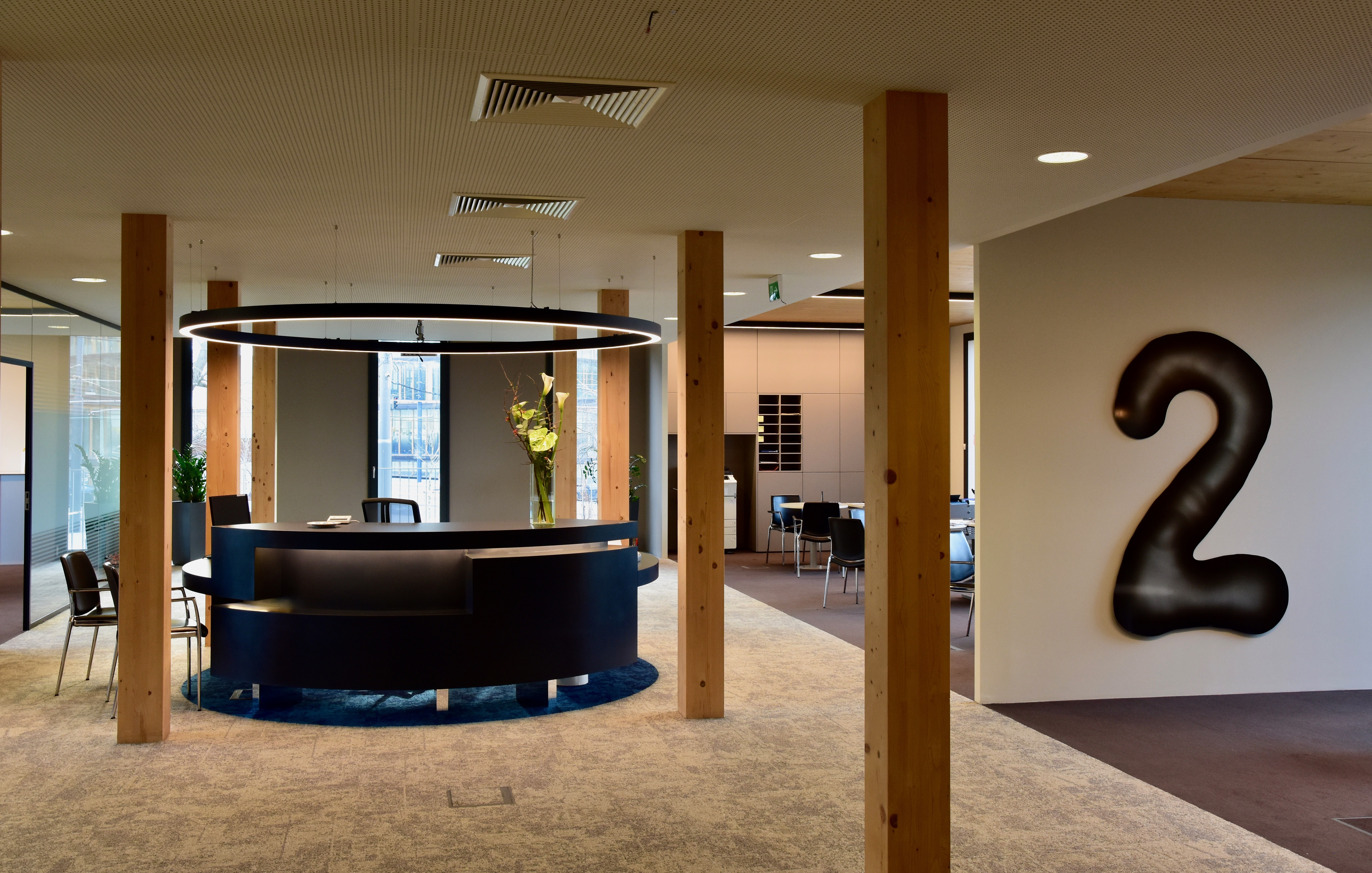
The main branch of the Zweite Sparkasse in Vienna-Leopoldstadt

Zweite Sparkasse provides banking services to clients in financial problem situations. Only people referred to Zweite Sparkasse via one of the cooperating advisory organisations are accepted as clients. On the basis of this recommendation, the new client is provided with an account, initially for a three years term, on a credit basis only and not allowing any overdrafts.

The account is debited with a so-called "account management charge" of €9 per quarter, which is refunded to the client when they change to a conventional commercial bank and the second account is closed. Clients are given an ATM card free of charge based on the Maestro system.

Zweite Sparkasse also offers a "permanent account" to allow customers additional time to sort out their financial problems, and "managed accounts" from which essential payments are made automatically. All clients are issued a basic insurance package when opening an account: free legal advice every three months, small accident insurance policy, household insurance (premium).

=== Organization ===
Zweite Sparkasse is a bank. The difference between Zweite Sparkasse and conventional banks consists in its social purpose, its volunteering consultants, and its not-for-profit status.

Zweite Sparkasse cooperates closely with Caritas and the Austrian debt counselling services. In Vienna and some other provincial locations Zweite Sparkasse cooperates with numerous other non-governmental organisations.

== Awards ==
- 2006: 20th Greinecker Senior Citizens Award of the ORF to Evelyn Hayden for "Die Zweite Wiener Vereins-Sparkasse" (submitted by ERSTE Foundation).
- 2007: Sozialmarie 2007 for "Bank für Menschen ohne Bank" (3rd prize).
- 2008: Company Social Award of the Fair Finance Association (2nd place; awarded in April 2009).
- 2010: TRIGOS 2010 - Nomination for the special award "Measures against poverty and social discrimination" (among the best 29 of 166 projects).
- 2011: Sozialmarie 2011 for the debt prevention project "I €AN - Workshops for a Good Start in Living with Money" (4th prize - €1000 prize jointly with the Debt Counselling Service Vienna and Jugend am Werk).
- 2012: Dubai International Award For Best Practices To Improve The Living Environment Award (joint prize from UN-HABITAT and Dubai City Council).
- 2013: Trigos Austria 2013 in the EU category "Best Partnership: Big Companies" as part of the "1st European CSR Award".
- 2017: In June 2017, the two founding directors Evelyn Hayden and Gerhard Ruprecht were awarded the Golden Medal of Honor for Services to the Republic of Austria.

Source for all:
