= Kocijančič =

Kocijančič is a Slovene surname. Notable people with the surname include:

- Gorazd Kocijančič (born 1964), Slovene philosopher, poet, and translator
- Janez Kocijančič (1941–2020), Slovene politician and lawyer
