= Auriti =

Auriti is a surname. Notable people with the surname include:

- Giacinto Auriti (1923–2006), Italian lawyer, essayist, and politician
- Marino Auriti (1891–1980), Italian-born American artist
