= Venice Biennale =

International arts exhibition in Italy

Venice Biennale Biennale di Venezia (Italian)

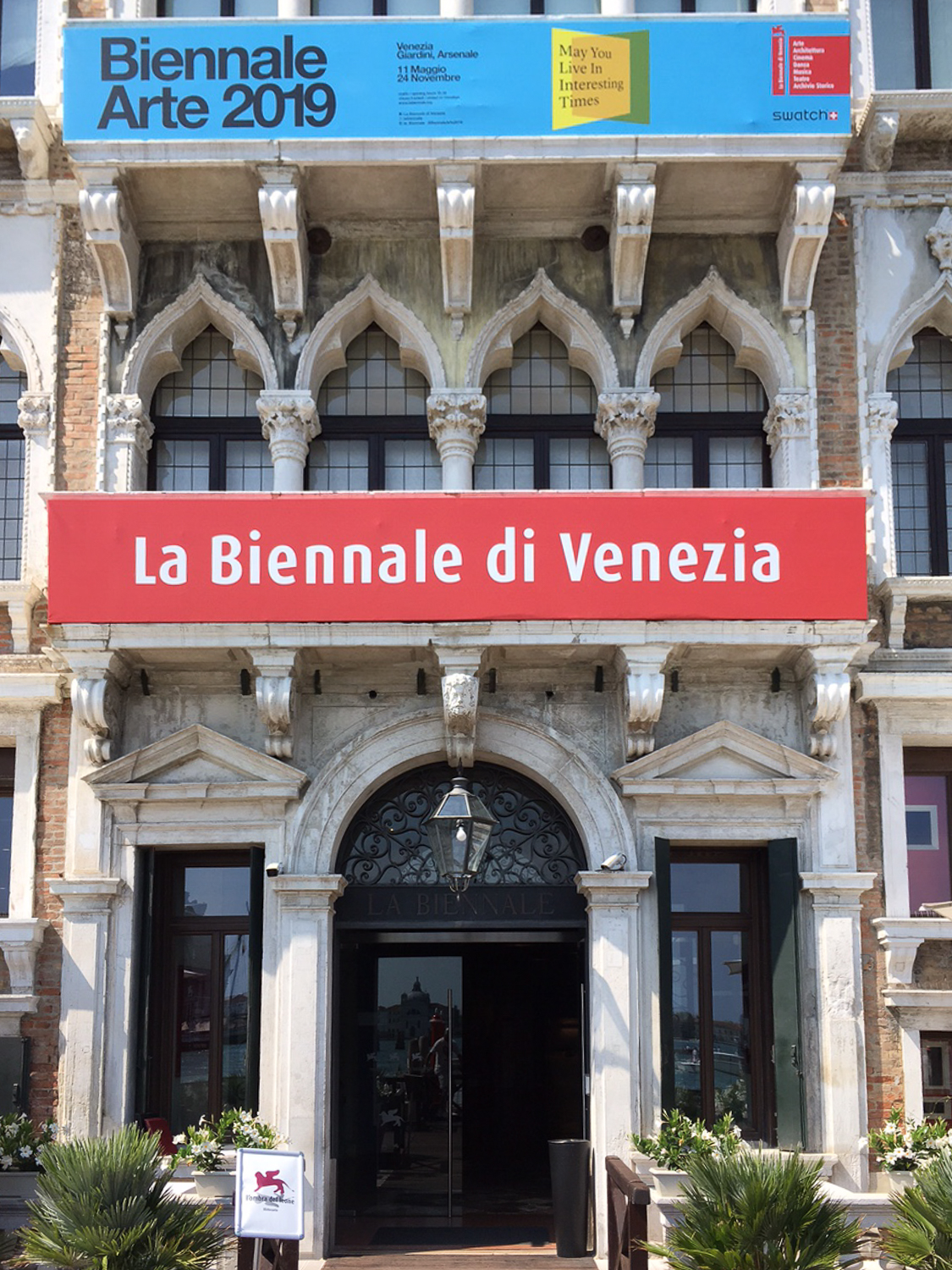
- Genre: Biennale; focuses on contemporary art, and includes events for art, contemporary dance, architecture, cinema, and theatre
- Frequency: Biennial; the main exhibition alternates every second year between art and architecture
- Locations: Venice, Italy
- Coordinates: 45.428889°N 12.358611°E
- Inaugurated: 30 April 1895
- Founder: City Council of Venice
- Organiser: The Biennale Foundation
- Website: www.labiennale.org

The Venice Biennale (/ˌbiːɛˈnɑːleɪ, -li/ BEE-en-AH-lay, -lee; Italian: la Biennale di Venezia [la bi.enˈnaːle di veˈnɛttsja]) is an international cultural exhibition hosted every two years in Venice, Italy. There are two main components of the festival, known as the Art Biennale (la Biennale d'Arte di Venezia; described in this article) and the Architecture Biennale (la Biennale d'Architettura di Venezia), which have been held in alternating years since the establishment of the latter in 1980. There are also four additional components, comprising Biennale Musica, Biennale Teatro, Venice Film Festival, and Venice Dance Biennale. Between them they cover contemporary art, architecture, music, theatre, film, and contemporary dance. The main exhibition is held in Castello and has around 30 permanent pavilions built by different countries.

The Biennale has been organised every other year since 1895, which makes it the oldest of its kind. Since 2021, the Art Biennale has taken place in even years and the Architecture Biennale in odd years. Exhibition awards within each festival are known as the Golden Lion awards, which include the Golden Lion for Lifetime Achievement.

The 2026 Venice Biennale is taking place from May 9 to November 22, 2026.

== History ==
=== 1895–1947 ===
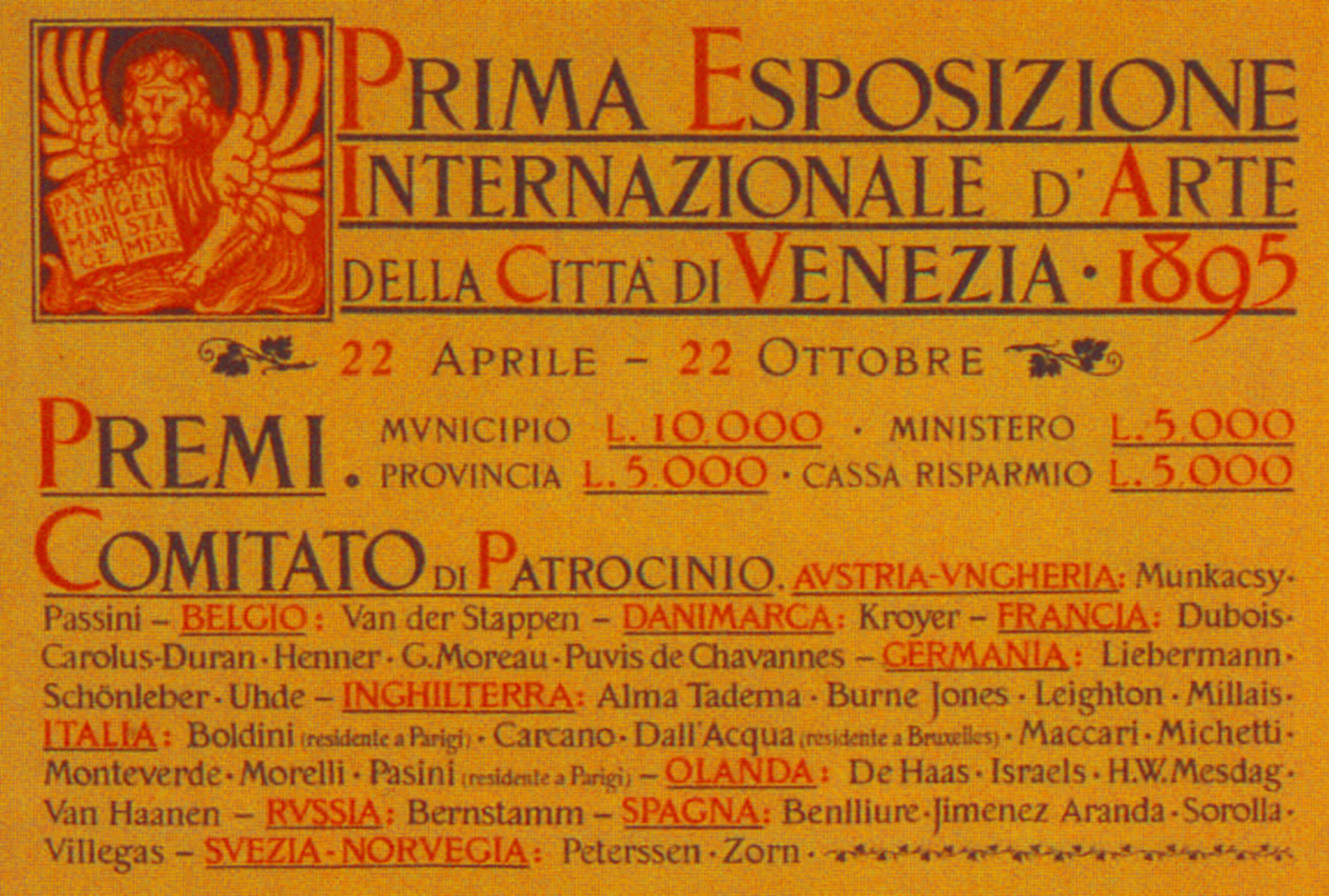
First edition official poster

On 19 April 1893, the Venetian City Council passed a resolution to set up a biennial exhibition of Italian Art ("Esposizione biennale artistica nazionale") to celebrate the silver anniversary of King Umberto I and Margherita of Savoy.

A year later, the council decreed "to adopt a 'by invitation' system; to reserve a section of the Exhibition for foreign artists too; to admit works by uninvited Italian artists, as selected by a jury."

The first Biennale, "I Esposizione Internazionale d'Arte della Città di Venezia (1st International Art Exhibition of the City of Venice)" (although originally scheduled for 22 April 1894) was opened on 30 April 1895, by the Italian King and Queen, Umberto I and Margherita di Savoia. The first exhibition was seen by 224,000 visitors. The exhibition took place in the Giardini.

The event became increasingly international in the first decades of the 20th century: from 1907 on, several countries installed national pavilions at the exhibition, with the first being from Belgium. In 1910 the first internationally well-known artists were displayed: a room dedicated to Gustav Klimt, a one-man show for Renoir, a retrospective of Courbet. A work by Picasso, "Family of Saltimbanques", was removed from the Spanish salon in the central Palazzo because it was feared that its novelty might shock the public. By 1914 seven pavilions had been established: Belgium (1907), Hungary (1909), Germany (1909), Great Britain (1909), France (1912), and Russia (1914).

During World War I, the 1916 and 1918 events were cancelled. In 1920 the post of mayor of Venice and president of the Biennale was split. The new secretary general, Vittorio Pica brought about the first presence of avant-garde art, notably Impressionists and Post-Impressionists.

1922 saw an exhibition of sculpture by African artists. Between the two World Wars, many important modern artists had their work exhibited there. In 1928 the Istituto Storico d'Arte Contemporanea (Historical Institute of Contemporary Art) opened, which was the first nucleus of archival collections of the Biennale. In 1930 its name was changed into Historical Archive of Contemporary Art.

In 1930, the Biennale was transformed into an Ente Autonomo (Autonomous Board) by Royal Decree with law no. 33 of 13 January 1930. Subsequently, the control of the Biennale passed from the Venice city council to the national Fascist government under Benito Mussolini. This brought on a restructuring, an associated financial boost, as well as a new president, Count Giuseppe Volpi di Misurata. Three entirely new events were established, including the Biennale Musica in 1930, also referred to as International Festival of Contemporary Music; the Venice Film Festival in 1932, which they claim as the first film festival in history, also referred to as Venice International Film Festival; and the Biennale Theatro in 1934, also referred to as International Theatre Festival.

In 1933 the Biennale organized an exhibition of Italian art abroad. From 1938, Grand Prizes were awarded in the art exhibition section.

During World War II, the activities of the Biennale were interrupted: 1942 saw the last edition of the events. The Film Festival restarted in 1946, the Music and Theatre festivals were resumed in 1947, and the Art Exhibition in 1948.

=== 1948–1973 ===
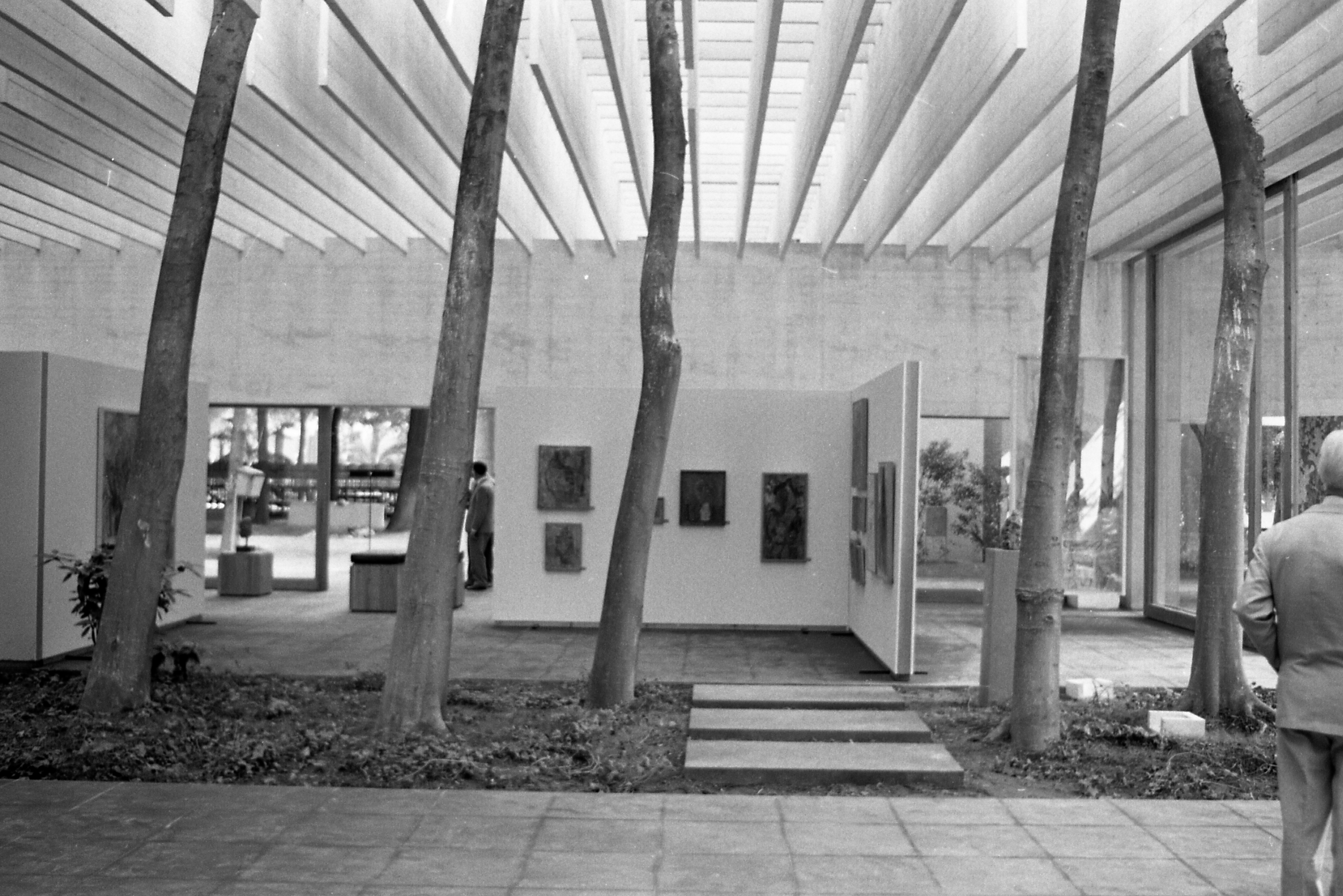
1962 Art Exhibition.

The Art Biennale was resumed in 1948 with a major exhibition of a recapitulatory nature. The Secretary General, art historian Rodolfo Pallucchini, started with the Impressionists and many protagonists of contemporary art including Chagall, Klee, Braque, Delvaux, Ensor, and Magritte, as well as a retrospective of Picasso's work. Peggy Guggenheim was invited to exhibit her collection, later to be permanently housed at Ca' Venier dei Leoni.

1949 saw the beginning of renewed attention to avant-garde movements in European—and later worldwide—movements in contemporary art. Abstract expressionism was introduced in the 1950s, and the Biennale is credited with importing Pop Art into the canon of art history by awarding the top prize to Robert Rauschenberg in 1964. From 1948 to 1972, Italian architect Carlo Scarpa did a series of remarkable interventions in the Biennale's exhibition spaces.

In 1954 the island San Giorgio Maggiore provided the venue for the first Japanese Noh theatre shows in Europe. 1956 saw the selection of films following an artistic selection and no longer based upon the designation of the participating country. The 1957 Golden Lion went to Satyajit Ray's Aparajito which introduced Indian cinema to the West.

1962 included Arte Informale at the Art Exhibition with Jean Fautrier, Hans Hartung, Emilio Vedova, and Pietro Consagra. The 1964 Art Exhibition introduced continental Europe to Pop Art (The Independent Group had been founded in Britain in 1952). The American Robert Rauschenberg was the first American artist to win the Gran Premio, and the youngest to date.

The student protests of 1968 also marked a crisis for the Biennale. Student protests hindered the opening of the Biennale. A resulting period of institutional changes opened and ending with a new Statute in 1973. In 1969, following the protests, the Grand Prizes were abandoned. These resumed in 1980 for the Mostra del Cinema and in 1986 for the Art Exhibition.

In 1972, for the first time, a theme was adopted by the Biennale, called "Opera o comportamento" ("Work or Behaviour").

Starting from 1973 the Music Festival was no longer held annually. During the year in which the Mostra del Cinema was not held, there was a series of "Giornate del cinema italiano" (Days of Italian Cinema) promoted by sectorial bodies in campo Santa Margherita, in Venice.

=== 1974–1998 ===
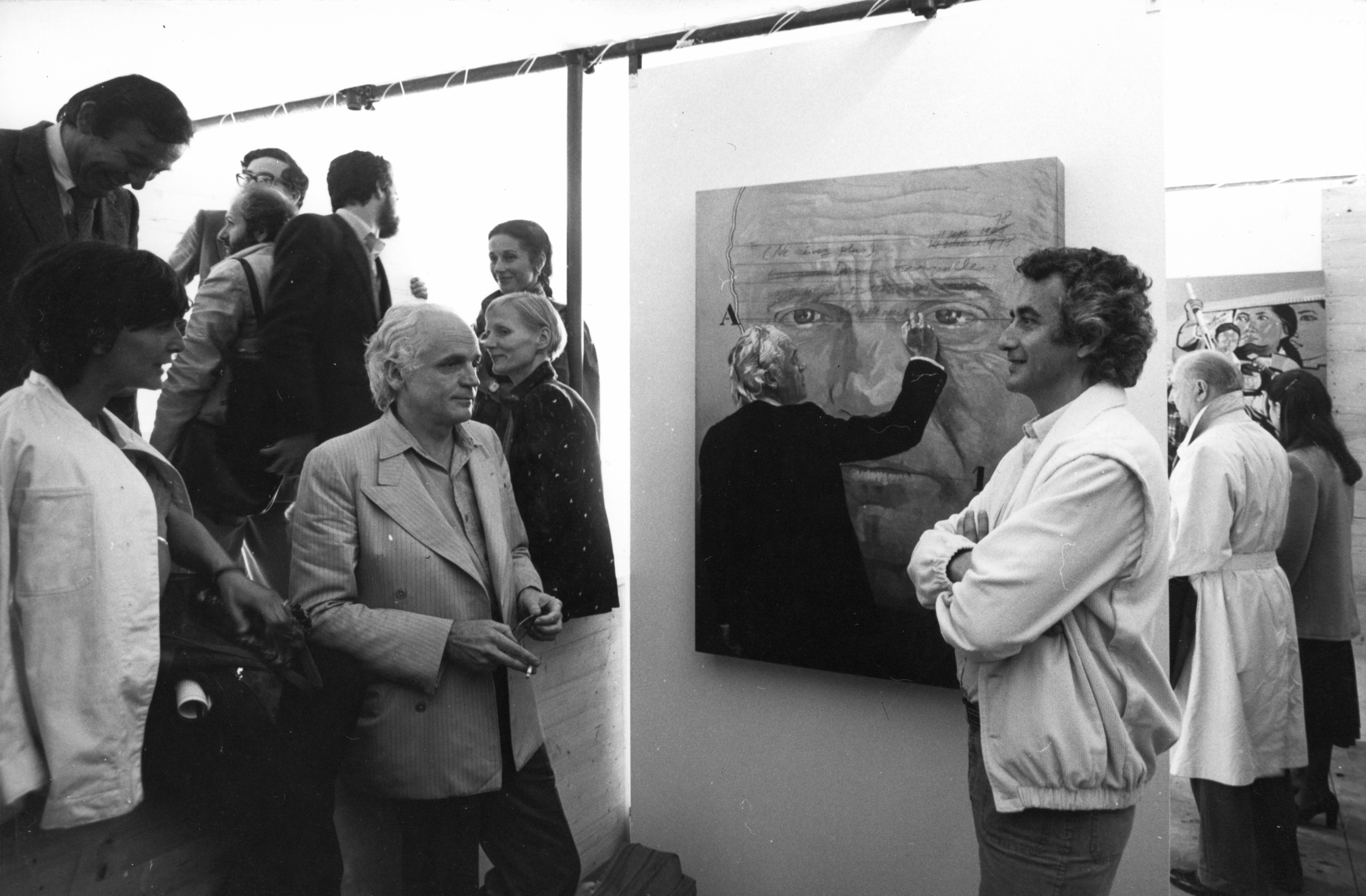
Alain Jouffroy and Herman Braun-Vega in front of the portrait of the former by the latter in 1980 at the 39th Venice Biennale where Braun-Vega represented Peru in the pavilion usually assigned to Uruguay.

1973 saw the start of the five-year presidency of Carlo Ripa di Meana. The International Art Exhibition was not held (until it was resumed in 1976). Theatre and cinema events were held in October 1974 and 1975 under the title Libertà per il Cile (Freedom for Chile)—a major cultural protest against the dictatorship of Augusto Pinochet.

On 15 November 1977, the so-called Dissident Biennale (in reference to the dissident movement in the USSR) opened. Because of the ensuing controversies within the Italian left wing parties, president Ripa di Meana resigned at the end of the year.

In 1978 the new presidency of Giuseppe Galasso (1978-1983) began. The principle was laid down whereby each of the artistic sectors was to have a permanent director to organise its activity.

In 1980, the Architecture section of the Biennale was set up. The director, Paolo Portoghesi, opened the Corderie dell'Arsenale to the public for the first time. At the Mostra del Cinema, the awards were brought back into being (between 1969 and 1979, the editions were non-competitive). In 1980, Achille Bonito Oliva and Harald Szeemann introduced "Aperto", a section of the exhibition designed to explore emerging art. Italian art historian Giovanni Carandente directed the 1988 and 1990 editions. A three-year gap was left afterwards to make sure that the 1995 edition would coincide with the 100th anniversary of the Biennale.

The 1993 edition was directed by Achille Bonito Oliva. In 1995, Jean Clair was appointed to be the Biennale's first non-Italian director of visual arts while Germano Celant served as director in 1997.

For the Centenary in 1995, the Biennale promoted events in every sector of its activity: the 34th Festival del Teatro, the 46th art exhibition, the 46th Festival di Musica, the 52nd Mostra del Cinema.

=== 1999–2019 ===
The 48th and 49th editions, in 1999 and 2001, were directed by Harald Szeemann. These editions had a larger representation of artists from Asia and Eastern Europe and young artists and expanded the show into several newly restored spaces of the Arsenale.

The inaugural Venice International Festival of Contemporary Dance (Biennale Danza) was held in 1999.

The 50th edition, 2003, directed by Francesco Bonami, had a record number of seven co-curators involved, including Hans Ulrich Obrist, Catherine David, Igor Zabel, Hou Hanru and Massimiliano Gioni.

The 51st edition of the Biennale opened in June 2005, curated, for the first time by two women, Maria de Corral and Rosa Martinez. De Corral organized "The Experience of Art" which included 41 artists, from past masters to younger figures. Rosa Martinez took over the Arsenale with "Always a Little Further." Drawing on "the myth of the romantic traveler" her exhibition involved 49 artists, ranging from the elegant to the profane.

In 2007, Robert Storr became the first director from the United States to curate the Biennale (the 52nd), with a show entitled Think with the Senses – Feel with the Mind. Art in the Present Tense.

Swedish curator Daniel Birnbaum was artistic director of the 2009 edition entitled "Fare Mondi // Making Worlds".

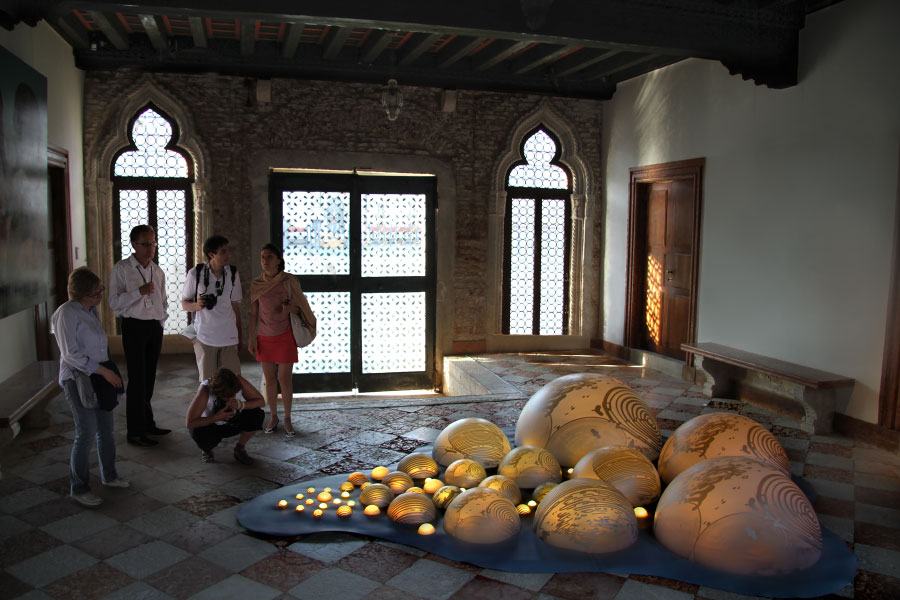
54th Venice Biennale, 2011.

The 2011 edition was curated by Swiss curator Bice Curiger entitled "ILLUMInazioni – ILLUMInations".

The Biennale in 2013 was curated by the Italian Massimiliano Gioni. His title and theme, Il Palazzo Enciclopedico / The Encyclopedic Palace, was adopted from an architectural model by the self-taught Italian-American artist Marino Auriti. Auriti's work, The Encyclopedic Palace of the World was lent by the American Folk Art Museum and exhibited in the first room of the Arsenale for the duration of the biennale. For Gioni, Auriti's work, "meant to house all worldly knowledge, bringing together the greatest discoveries of the human race, from the wheel to the satellite," provided an analogous figure for the "biennale model itself...based on the impossible desire to concentrate the infinite worlds of contemporary art in a single place: a task that now seems as dizzyingly absurd as Auriti's dream."

Curator Okwui Enwezor was responsible for the 2015 edition. He was the first African-born curator of the biennial. As a catalyst for imagining different ways of imagining multiple desires and futures Enwezor commissioned special projects and programs throughout the Biennale in the Giardini. This included a Creative Time Summit, e-flux journal's SUPERCOMMUNITY, Gulf Labor Coalition, The Invisible Borders Trans-African Project and Abounaddara.

The 2017 Biennale, titled Viva Arte Viva, was directed by French curator Christine Macel who called it an "exhibition inspired by humanism". German artist Franz Erhard Walther won the Golden Lion for best artist in the central pavilion, while Carolee Schneemann was awarded a posthumous Golden Lion for Lifetime Achievement.

The 2019 Biennale, titled May You Live In Interesting Times, was directed by American-born curator Ralph Rugoff.

=== 2020–present ===
On 19 February 2020 Roberto Cicutto was appointed as president of the Biennale for a four-year period. The 2020 edition of the festival, due to be the 17th International Architecture Exhibition, due to open in May, was postponed owing to the COVID-19 pandemic: first to 29 August, and then until the following year. This caused the alternating odd-even years between art and architecture to swap places. Some online activities and podcasts were broadcast. The Film and Music festivals were confirmed in their original dates, but the Theatre and Dance festivals were rescheduled with new dates later in the year. In 2021 the Biennale of Architecture took place from 22 May to 21 November. It was titled "How will we live together?" and curated by Lebanese architect and scholar Hashim Sarkis.

The 2022 edition of the Art Biennale, curated by Italian curator Cecilia Alemani, was entitled "The Milk of Dreams" after a book by British-born Mexican surrealist painter Leonora Carrington.

In February 2024, thousands of artists and cultural workers, including Jesse Darling, Joanna Piotrowska, Nan Goldin, Michael Rakowitz, and Leila Sansour, signed a petition calling for Israel to be excluded from the Venice Biennale due to Israel's military campaign in the Gaza Strip. The Biennale rejected the petition, saying it would "not take into consideration any petition or call to exclude" countries recognized by Italy. Italian Culture Minister Gennaro Sangiuliano said that: "Israel not only has the right to express its art, but it has the duty to bear witness to its people precisely at a time like this when it has been ruthlessly struck by merciless terrorists. The Venice Art Biennale will always be a space of freedom, encounter and dialogue and not a space of censorship and intolerance." On 13 February 2024, the Holy See Press Office announced that Pope Francis would attend the Venice Biennale. He visited the Pavilion of the Holy See in the Prison Giudecca on Sunday 28 April 2024. This was the first time a pope has visited the international exhibition.

The 2026 Venice Biennale is taking place from May 9 to November 22, 2026 with national pavilions from 99 countries and an announced theme called In Minor Keys curated by Koyo Kouoh, who died of liver cancer a year before the exhibition started. It attracted controversy, given the range of ongoing disputes around the world. On 8 May 2026, along with violent disruptions, several national pavilions at the Venice Biennale temporarily closed as part of a strike organized by the Art Not Genocide Alliance (ANGA) protesting the inclusion of the Israeli pavilion amid the ongoing Gaza war. Participating pavilions reportedly included those of Austria, Belgium, France, Japan, the Netherlands, and South Korea. Belu-Simion Fainaru, representing Israel at the 2026 Venice Biennale, issued legal warnings after the Golden Lion jury announced that pavilions representing countries whose leaders were facing charges before the ICC, including Israel and Russia, would not be considered for awards competition. According to reports, the warnings were sent to the Biennale administration, the Italian Ministry of Culture, and the office of Italian prime minister Giorgia Meloni, alleging antisemitism and discrimination based on nationality. On 13 July 2026, Kaja Kallas announced that the European Commission had halted funding to the Venice Biennale, in response to Russia's participation in 2026.

== Organization ==
Common name	Formal name	Founded	Frequency
Venice Art Biennale	International Art Exhibition	1895	Even-numbered years (since 2022)
Venice Biennale of Architecture	International Architecture Exhibition	1980	Odd-numbered years (since 2021)
Biennale Musica	International Festival of Contemporary Music	1930	Annually (Sep/Oct)
Biennale Teatro	International Theatre Festival	1934	Annually (Jul/Aug)
Venice Film Festival	Venice International Film Festival	1932	Annually (Aug/Sep)
Biennale Danza	International Festival of Contemporary Dance	1999	Annually (June; biennially 2010–16)

The main exhibition held in Castello, in the halls of the Arsenale and Biennale Gardens, alternates between art and architecture (hence the name biennale; biennial). The other events hosted by the Foundation—spanning theatre, music, and dance—are held annually in various parts of Venice, whereas the Venice Film Festival takes place at the Lido.

=== Art ===
The Venice Art Biennale (La Biennale d'Arte di Venezia) is one of the world's largest and most significant contemporary visual art exhibitions. So named because it is held biennially, it is the original biennale on which others around the world have been modelled, after it inception in 1895. The exhibition space extends over 7,000 square metres, and artists from more than 75 countries are represented both in the communal exhibition areas and in the national pavilions.

Until 2019, the Art Biennale took place in odd‑numbered years and the Architecture Biennale in even‑numbered years; however, after the COVID‑19 pandemic forced a postponement, the Art Biennale has been held in even years, beginning in 2022, and the Architecture Biennale in odd years, beginning in 2021.

=== Music ===
Biennale Musica (The Venice Festival of Contemporary Music) was established in 1930,

=== Film ===
Main Article: Venice Film Festival

Theatre

Venice Theatre Festival (Biennale Teatro)

=== Dance ===
The inaugural Venice International Festival of Contemporary Dance (Biennale Danza) was held in 1999, and it is now held annually.

== Role in the art market ==
When the Venice Biennale was founded in 1895, one of its main goals was to establish a new market for contemporary art. Between 1942 and 1968 a sales office assisted artists in finding clients and selling their work, a service for which it charged 10% commission. Sales remained an intrinsic part of the biennale until 1968, when a sales ban was enacted. An important practical reason why the focus on non-commodities has failed to decouple Venice from the market is that the biennale itself lacks the funds to produce, ship and install these large-scale works. Therefore, the financial involvement of dealers is widely regarded as indispensable; as they regularly front the funding for production of ambitious projects. Furthermore, every other year the Venice Biennale coincides with nearby Art Basel, the world's prime commercial fair for modern and contemporary art. Numerous galleries with artists on show in Venice usually bring work by the same artists to Basel.

== Location ==
The formal Biennale is based at a park, the Giardini in Castello, Venice. The Giardini includes a large exhibition hall that houses a themed exhibition curated by the Biennale's director.

Initiated in 1980, the Aperto began as a fringe event for younger artists and artists of a national origin not represented by the permanent national pavilions. This is usually staged in the Arsenale and has become part of the formal biennale programme. In 1995 there was no Aperto so a number of participating countries hired venues to show exhibitions of emerging artists. From 1999, both the international exhibition and the Aperto were held as one exhibition, held both at the Central Pavilion and the Arsenale. Also in 1999, a $1 million renovation transformed the Arsenale area into a cluster of renovated shipyards, sheds and warehouses, more than doubling the Arsenale's exhibition space of previous years.

A special edition of the 54th Biennale was held at Padiglione Italia of Torino Esposizioni – Sala Nervi (December 2011 – February 2012) for the 150th Anniversary of Italian Unification. The event was directed by Vittorio Sgarbi.

=== National pavilions ===
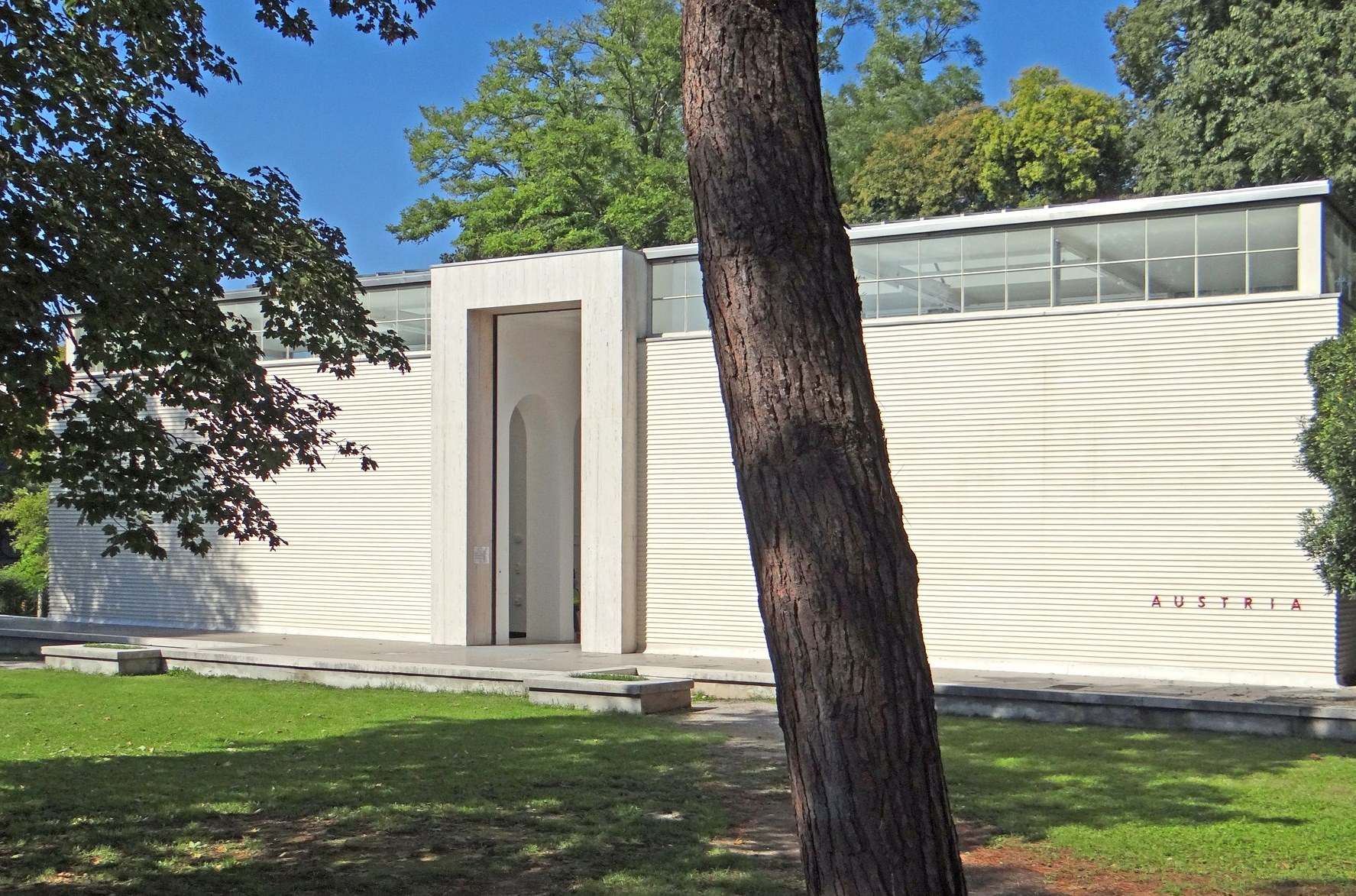
Austria national pavilion

The Giardini houses 30 permanent national pavilions. Alongside the Central Pavilion, built in 1894 and later restructured and extended several times, the Giardini are occupied by a further 29 permanent pavilions built at different periods by the various countries participating in the Biennale. The first nation to build a pavilion was Belgium in 1907, followed by Germany, Britain and Hungary in 1909. The pavilions are the property of the individual countries and are managed by their ministries of culture.

Countries not owning a pavilion in the Giardini are exhibited in other venues across Venice. The number of countries represented is still growing. In 2005, China was showing for the first time, followed by the African Pavilion and Mexico (2007), the United Arab Emirates (2009), and India (2011).

The assignment of the permanent pavilions was largely dictated by the international politics of the 1930s and the Cold War. There is no single format to how each country manages their pavilion, established and emerging countries represented at the biennial maintain and fund their pavilions in different ways. While pavilions are usually government-funded, private money plays an increasingly large role; in 2015, the pavilions of Iraq, Ukraine and Syria were completely privately funded. The pavilion for Great Britain is always managed by the British Council while the United States assigns the responsibility to a public gallery chosen by the Department of State which, since 1985, has been the Peggy Guggenheim Collection. The countries at the Arsenale that request a temporary exhibition space pay a hire fee per square meter.

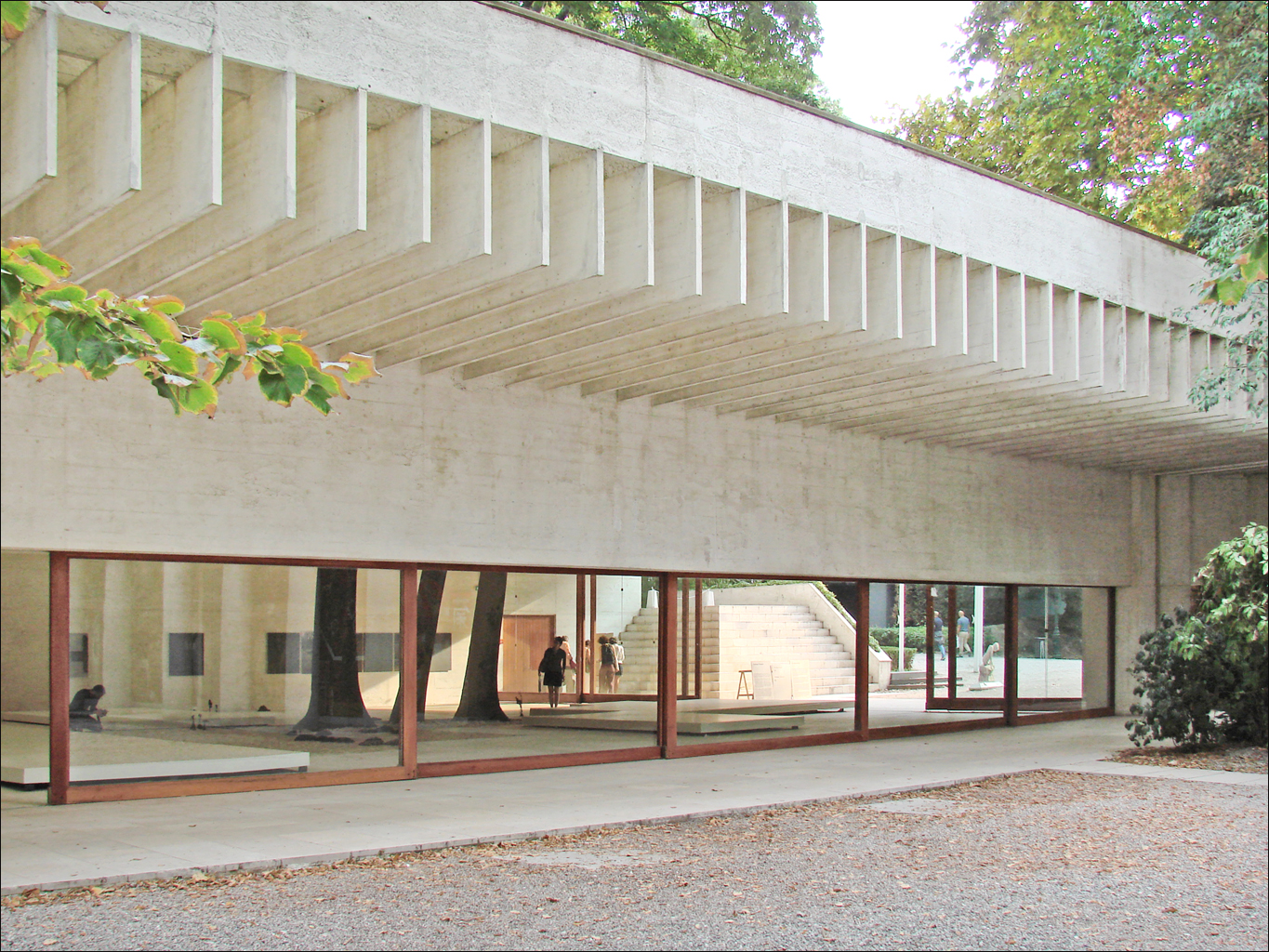
Sweden national pavilion

In 2011, the countries were Albania, Andorra, Argentina, Australia, Austria, Bangladesh, Belarus, Belgium, Brazil, Bulgaria, Canada, Chile, China, Congo, Costa Rica, Croatia, Cuba, Cyprus, Czechia and Slovakia, Denmark, Egypt, Estonia, Finland, France, Georgia, Germany, Greece, Haiti, Hungary, Iceland, India, Iran, Iraq, Ireland, Israel, Italy, Japan, Korea, Latvia, Lithuania, Luxembourg, Macedonia, Mexico, Moldova, Montenegro, Netherlands, New Zealand, Norway, Poland, Portugal, Romania, Russia, San Marino, Saudi Arabia, Serbia, Singapore, Slovenia, South Africa, Spain, Sweden, Switzerland, Syrian Arab Republic, Taiwan, Thailand, Turkey, Ukraine, United Arab Emirates, United Kingdom, United States of America, Uruguay, Venezuela, Wales, and Zimbabwe. In addition to this there are two collective pavilions: Central Asia Pavilion and Istituto Italo-Latino Americano. In 2013, eleven new participant countries developed national pavilions for the Biennale: Angola, Bosnia and Herzegowina, the Bahamas, Bahrain, the Ivory Coast, Kosovo, Kuwait, the Maldives, Paraguay, Tuvalu, and the Holy See. In 2015, five new participant countries developed pavilions for the Biennale: Grenada, Republic of Mozambique, Republic of Seychelles, Mauritius and Mongolia. In 2017, three countries participated in the Art Biennale for the first time: Antigua and Barbuda, Kiribati, and Nigeria. In 2019, four countries participated in the Art Biennale for the first time: Ghana, Madagascar, Malaysia, and Pakistan.

The pavilions also used the Architecture Biennale.

As well as the national pavilions there are countless "unofficial pavilions" that spring up every year. In 2009 there were pavilions such as the Gabon Pavilion and a Peckham pavilion. In 2017 The Diaspora Pavilion bought together 19 artists from complex, multinational backgrounds to challenge the prevalence of the nation state at the Biennale.

In 2009, the Internet Pavilion (Italian: Padiglione Internet) was founded as a platform for activists and artists working in new media. Subsequent editions were held since, 2013, in conjunction with the biennale.

== Awards ==
=== Art ===
The Venice Biennale has awarded prizes to artists participating in the Exhibition since its inaugural edition in 1895. Grand Prizes were established in 1938 and continued until 1968, when they were abolished in the wake of the protest movement. The practice of awarding prizes resumed in 1986. Selections are made by the Board of la Biennale di Venezia, upon the recommendation of the International Exhibition's curator.

Also upon the recommendation of the curator, the Biennale names the five members of its international jury, which is charged with awarding prizes to the national pavilions. The international jury awards the Golden Lion for best national participation, the Golden Lion for best participant in the international exhibition, and the Silver Lion for a "promising young participant" in the show. It may also designate one special mention to national participants, and a maximum of two special mentions to artists in the international exhibition.

=== Film ===
Awards known as Golden Lions are awarded at the various other festivals as part of the Biennale, with the term Golden Lion usually referring to the Venice Film Festival. Similarly, the Golden Lion for Lifetime Achievement often refers to the award given at the film festival.

=== Others ===
Golden Lions for Lifetime Achievement are also awarded at the Architecture, Theatre, Dance, and Music festivals, as well as Silver Lions.

In architecture, the Golden Lion for Best National Participation and the Golden Lion for Best Participation are awarded.

In dance, a Golden Lion for Lifetime Achievement in Dance as well as a Silver Lion is usually awarded. In 2026, the Lifetime achievement award went to Indigenous Australian dance company Bangarra Dance Theatre, while the Silver Lion went to South African choreographer and activist Mamela Nyamza.

In music, a Golden Lion for Lifetime Achievement is awarded.

In theatre, the Golden Lion for Lifetime Achievement in Theatre has been awarded since 2006, and the Silver Lion "dedicated to the most compelling voices in theatre in recent years, or to institutions that have distinguished themselves for cultivating new talents", has been awarded since 2011.

== Collateral events ==
In conjunction with the primary international exhibition and national pavilions, many local and international galleries, museums, foundations, and nonprofits stage independent exhibitions throughout the city of Venice. The curator of the international exhibition chooses a number of these exhibitions to be included as Collateral Events in the Biennale program. While these exhibitions are not organized by the Biennale, exhibitions chosen as Collateral Events are promoted by the Biennale as an additional component of the event.

== Management ==
=== Legal structure ===
The offices of the Biennale are at Ca' Giustinian in the sestiere San Marco.

On 26 July 1973, Italian Parliament approved the Organization's new statute for the Biennale. A "democratic" Board was set up. It included 19 members made up of representatives from the Government, the most important local organizations, major trade unions, and a representative of the staff. The Board was to elect the President and nominate the Sectorial Directors – one each for Visual arts, Cinema, Music, and Theatre.

In 1998 the Biennale was transformed into a legal personality in private law and renamed "Società di Cultura La Biennale di Venezia". The company structure – Board of directors, Scientific committee, Board of auditors and assembly of private backers – has a duration of four years. The areas of activity became six (Architecture, Visual arts, Cinema, Theatre, Music, Dance), in collaboration with the ASAC (the Historical Archives). The President is nominated by the Minister for Cultural Affairs. The Board of directors consists of the President, the Mayor of Venice, and three members nominated by Veneto regional government and private backers. Dance was added to the others.

On 15 January 2004, the Biennale was transformed into a foundation.

=== Presidents ===
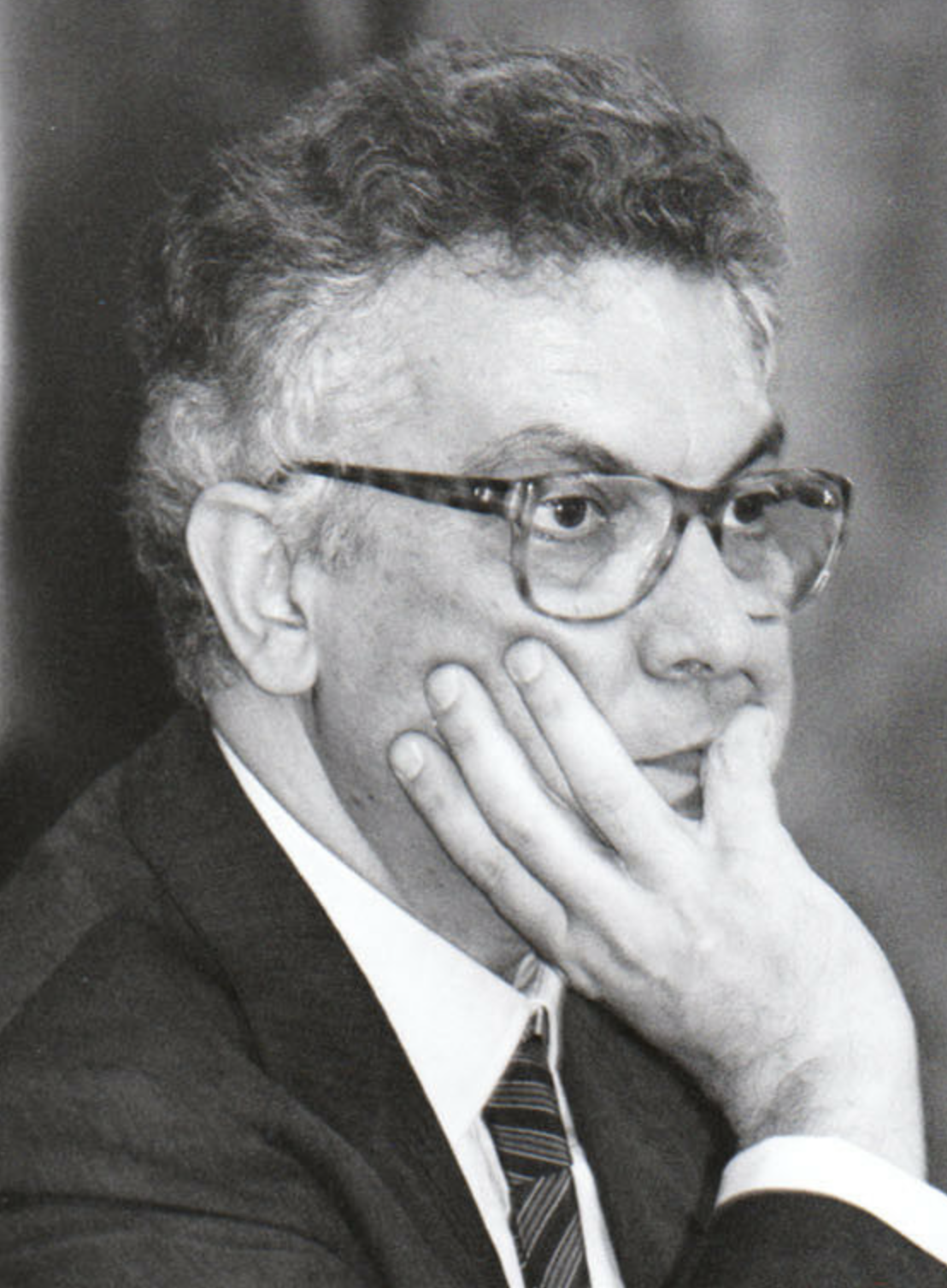
Paolo Baratta has been the longest-serving president of Venice Biennale, in office for more than 15 years (1998–2001; 2008–2020).

- 1973–1978 – Carlo Ripa di Meana
- 1978–1983 – Giuseppe Galasso
- 1983–1993 – Paolo Portoghesi
- 1993–1996 – Gian Luigi Rondi
- 1997 – Lino Miccichè
- 1998–2001 – Paolo Baratta
- 2001–2003 – Franco Bernabé
- 2004–2007 – Davide Croff
- 2008–2020 – Paolo Baratta
- 2020–2024 – Roberto Cicutto
- since 2024 – Pietrangelo Buttafuoco

=== Budget ===
For the 2013 edition, the main exhibition's budget was about $2.3 million; in addition, more than $2 million was raised mostly from private individuals and foundations and philanthropists. The budget for the international exhibition was 13 million euros (about $14.2 million) in 2013 and nearly $19 million in 2022.

== See also ==
- São Paulo Art Biennial
- Shanghai Biennale
- Sharjah Biennale
- Milan Triennial
- Rome Quadriennale
- Whitney Biennial
