= Iztok Geister =

Slovenian writer, lawyer and ornithologist (born 1945)

- Born: 20 August 1945 (age 81); Laško, Socialist Federal Republic of Yugoslavia (now in Slovenia)
- Occupations: Writer; poet; essayist; lawyer; ornithologist
- Writing career
- Notable works: Levitve, Pospala poželenja
- Notable awards: Rožanc Award; 2001 for Levitve; Prešeren Foundation Award; 2004 for Pospala poželenja

Iztok Geister (born 20 August 1945) is a Slovene writer, poet, essayist and ornithologist. He is best known for his avant-garde poetry from the mid-1960s and 1970s. He is also one of the founding members of the Slovenian branch of BirdLife International.

Geister was born in Laško in 1945. He studied law at the University of Ljubljana but has worked as a freelance artist and naturalist for over thirty years. In 2001 he received the Rožanc Award for his essays Levitve (Moultings). In 2005 he won the Prešeren Foundation Award for his book Pospala poželenja.

== Published work ==
=== Prose ===
- Levitve (2001)
- Pospala poželenja (2002)
- Mojster zloženih peruti (2003)

=== Popular science monographs ===
- Ljubljansko barje (1995)
- Nenavadni izleti : v slovensko naravo (2003)
- Sečoveljske soline (2004)
- Naravni zakladi Brda pri Kranju (2006)
