= Edvard Kovač =

Theologian, philosopher and writer

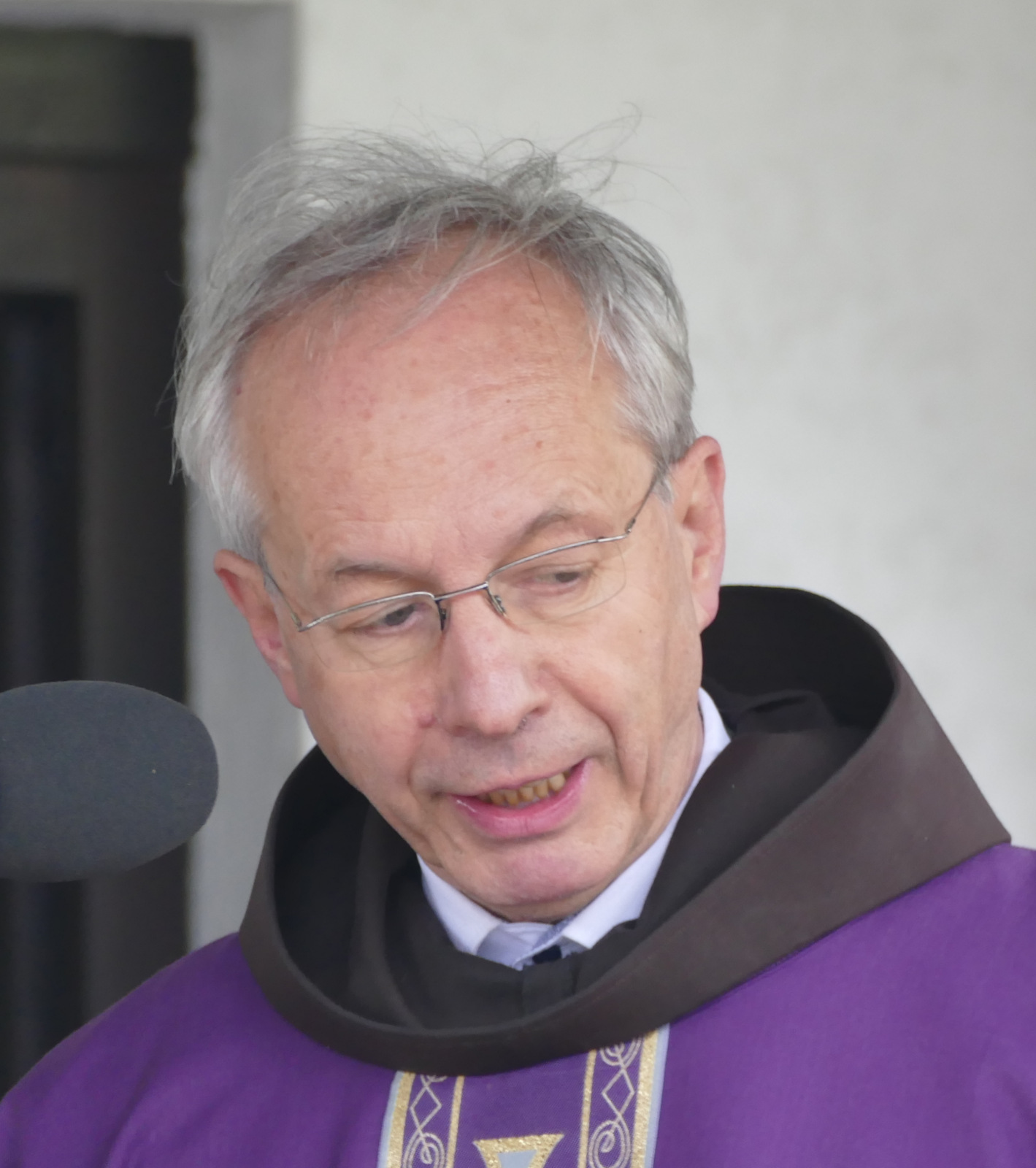
- Born: 1950 (age 75–76)
- Occupations: Theologian, philosopher and writer
- Writing career
- Notable work: Oddaljena bližina
- Notable awards: Rožanc Award; 2000 for Oddaljena bližina

Fr. Edvard Kovač (born 1950) is a Slovenian theologian, philosopher and author. He is a member of the Order of Friars Minor and professor at the University of Ljubljana Theological Faculty and the Catholic University of Toulouse.

Kovač is author of numerous published works and has twice been awarded the French Ordre du Mérite. In 2000 he received the Rožanc Award (the most prestigious Slovenian award for essayism) for his collection of essays Oddaljena bližina (The Distant Proximity).

His thought has been influenced by the Jewish theologians Emmanuel Levinas and Martin Buber, the Christian existentialism of Gabriel Marcel and by the French Nouvelle Théologie.

== Published works ==
- Nietzschejeva tragičnost (The Tragedy of Nietzsche), 1980
- Slovenska nacionalna zavest (Slovene National Conscience), 1992 (with Franc Rode)
- Modrost o ljubezni (Wisdom on Love), 1992
- Oddaljena bližina (The Distant Proximity), 2000
