= Igor Zabel =

Slovene art historian, curator, and essayist (1958–2005)

- Born: 14 August 1958; Ljubljana, Socialist Federal Republic of Yugoslavia (now in Slovenia)
- Died: 23 July 2005 (aged 46); Ljubljana, Slovenia
- Occupations: Art historian, curator, essayist and literary critic
- Writing career
- Notable works: Eseji I, Eseji II
- Notable awards: Rožanc Award; 2007 for Eseji o moderni in sodobni umetnosti

Igor Zabel (14 August 1958 – 23 July 2005) was a Slovene art historian, curator, and essayist. He was curator at the Museum of Modern Art in Ljubljana and one of the most prominent writers on modern and contemporary art in Slovenia. In 2007 he was posthumously awarded the Rožanc Award for his essays on Modern and Contemporary Art.

The Igor Zabel Association for Culture and Theory and its Igor Zabel Award carry his name, in the memory of his work.

== Life ==
Zabel was born in Ljubljana. He graduated in Philosophy, History of Art, and Comparative literature at the University of Ljubljana in 1982. In 1989, he received his master's degree from the same university.

Between 1984 and 1986, Igor Zabel worked as a freelance writer. In 1986, he started working as curator at the Ljubljana Museum of Modern Art, later gaining the title of senior curator. In 2003 he worked as a curator for the Venice Biennale.

Hi died on 23 July 2005 due to complications that followed a knee surgery.

== The Igor Zabel Association for Culture and Theory ==
Two years after Igor Zabel's sudden death, in 2007, his family members along the ERSTE Foundation founded The Igor Zabel Association for Culture and Theory. The association reports its goal as the promotion of the ongoing importance of Zabel's work "for art and cultural understanding between East and West" Europe.

The Igor Zabel Award for outstanding cultural activities related to the Central and South Eastern European region and the Igor Zabel Competition for innovative curatorial approaches and theoretical research in contemporary visual arts are both named after him.

== Work ==
Zabel's research focused on post-communist literature and art in Eastern and Central Europe. His complete bibliography can be found at the Association website.

=== Exhibitions ===
==== In Ljubljana ====
- Aspects of the Minimal: Minimal Art in Slovenia 1968–1980 (1990);
- OHO–A Retrospective (1994);
- Inexplicable Presence: Curator's Working Place (1997);
- Tank! Slovene Historical Avant-Garde (1998, with Breda Ilich Klančnik);
- The Eye and Its Truth (2001);
- Seven Sins: Ljubljana - Moscow (2004; with Zdenka Badovinac and Viktor Misiano);
- Slovene Art 1975–2005 (2003–05, with Igor Španjol).
- Individual Systems, at the 50th Venice Biennale (2003)
- 33rd Zagreb Salon, at the Museum and Gallery Centre Zagreb (1998);
- Aspects/Positions, at the Museum moderner Kunst – Stiftung Ludwig, Vienna (1999, along with the chief curator: Lóránd Hegyi);
- The Future Is Not What It Used To Be, Galerie für Zeitgenössische Kunst Leipzig (2004, with Barbara Steiner)

=== Published works ===
==== Short stories ====
- Strategije, taktike (1985)
- Lise na steni (1993)
- Magazine of Moderna galerija Ljubljana M’ars

=== Collection of Essays ===
- Vmesni prostor: eseji o slikarstvu Emerika Bernarda [Intermediate Space: Essays on Emeric Bernard's Painting] (1991)
- Speculationes (1997)
- Connected Cities (1999);
- L’autre moitié de l’Europe (The Other Half of Europe) (2000);
- Primary Documents: A Primer of Critical Writing on Critical Art in Eastern Central Europe (2002).
- Eseji I and II [Essays I and II; posthumously (2006 and 2008)
- Igor Zabel: Contemporary Art Theory (after his death)

=== Edition and Translation ===
He edited the Manifesta Journal: Journal of Contemporary Curatorship (with Viktor Misiano) and the Magazine of Moderna galerija Ljubljana M’ars. He also translated to translations numerous texts and books from the field of humanities and literature: Thomas Pynchon, Edward W. Said, Oscar Wilde, Immanuel Maurice Wallerstein, Sigmund Freud, Michael Baxandall, Erwin Panofsky.

== Published works ==
- Strategije, taktike, short stories, 1985
- Vmesni prostor: eseji o slikarstvu Emerika Bernarda, collection of essays, 1991
- Lise na steni, short stories, 1993
- Speculationes, collection of essays, 1997
- Eseji I, collection of essays, 2006
- Eseji II, collection of essays, 2008
