= Ifigenija Zagoričnik Simonović =

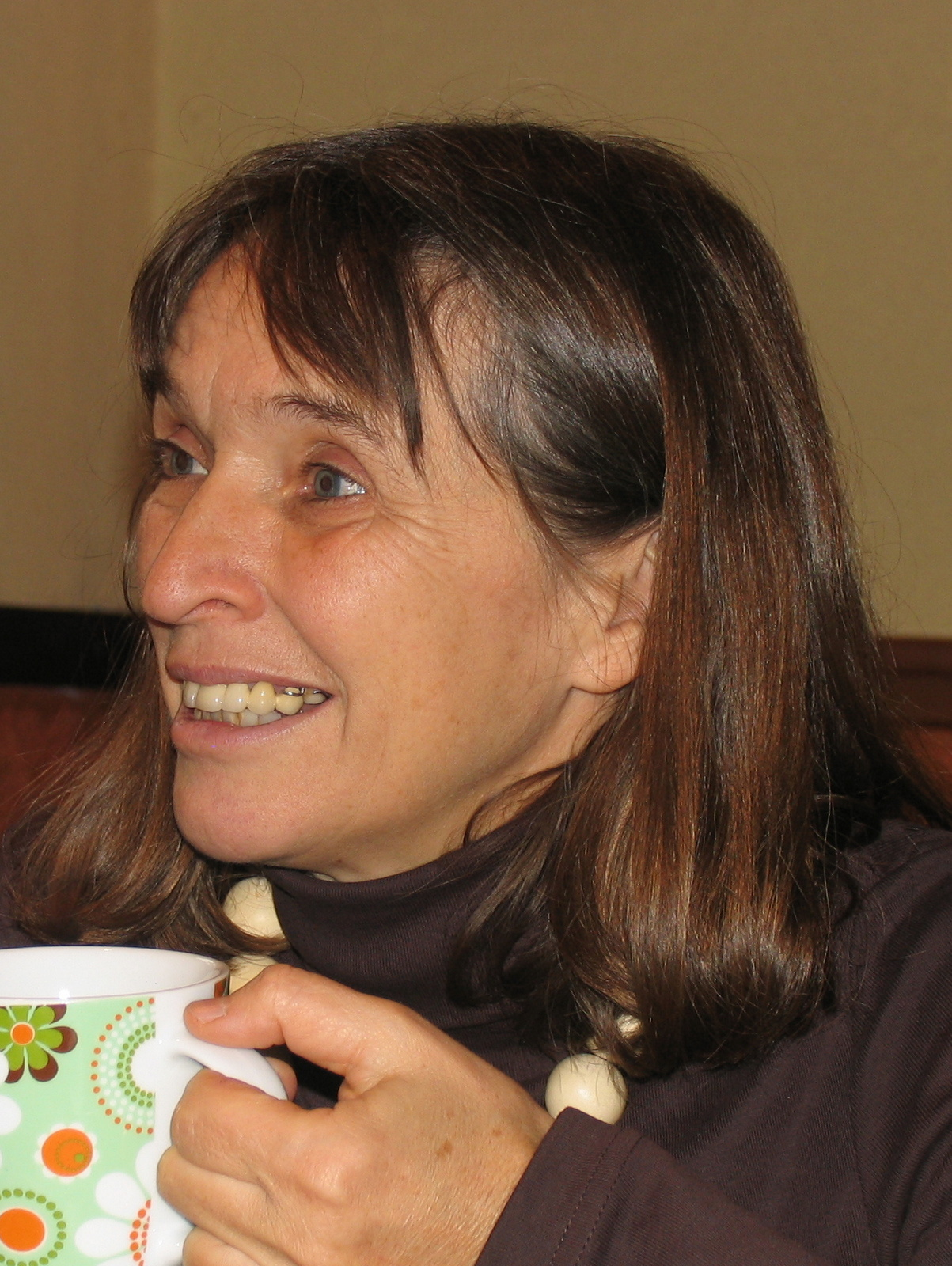
- Born: 24 March 1953; Kranj, Socialist Federal Republic of Yugoslavia (now in Slovenia)
- Occupations: Poet, essayist, writer, editor and potter
- Writing career
- Notable works: Kaj je v kamnu, Konci in kraji
- Notable awards: Rožanc Award; 2011 for Konci in kraji

Ifigenija Zagoričnik Simonović (born 24 March 1953) is a Slovene poet, essayist, writer, editor and potter.

Zagoričnik was born in Kranj in 1953. She studied Comparative literature and Slavistics at the University of Ljubljana and from 1978 to 2003 lived in London where she attended Art school and worked as a potter and artist. In 2009 she received the Rožanc Award for her collection of essays Konci in kraji (Bits and Places). She also writes for children.

== Published works ==
=== For adults ===
- Postopna razbremenitev, poetry collection
- Te pesmi, poetry collection
- Drevesa so se takrat premikala in sem pomešala njihova imena, poetry collection
- Krogi in vprašanja, poetry collection
- Kaj je v kamnu, poetry collection
- Konci in kraji, collection of essays

=== For children ===
- Kaj je kdo rekel in česa kdo ni, poetry
- Poljub za princesko Kvakico, fairy tale
- Punčka z grdimi lasmi, fairy tale

=== Editorial work ===
- Pesmi iz zapora (Poems from Prison), collection of seven books, and Pesmi s »prostosti« (Poems from Freedom) by the Slovene writer Vitomil Zupan
