= The Encyclopedic Palace of the World =

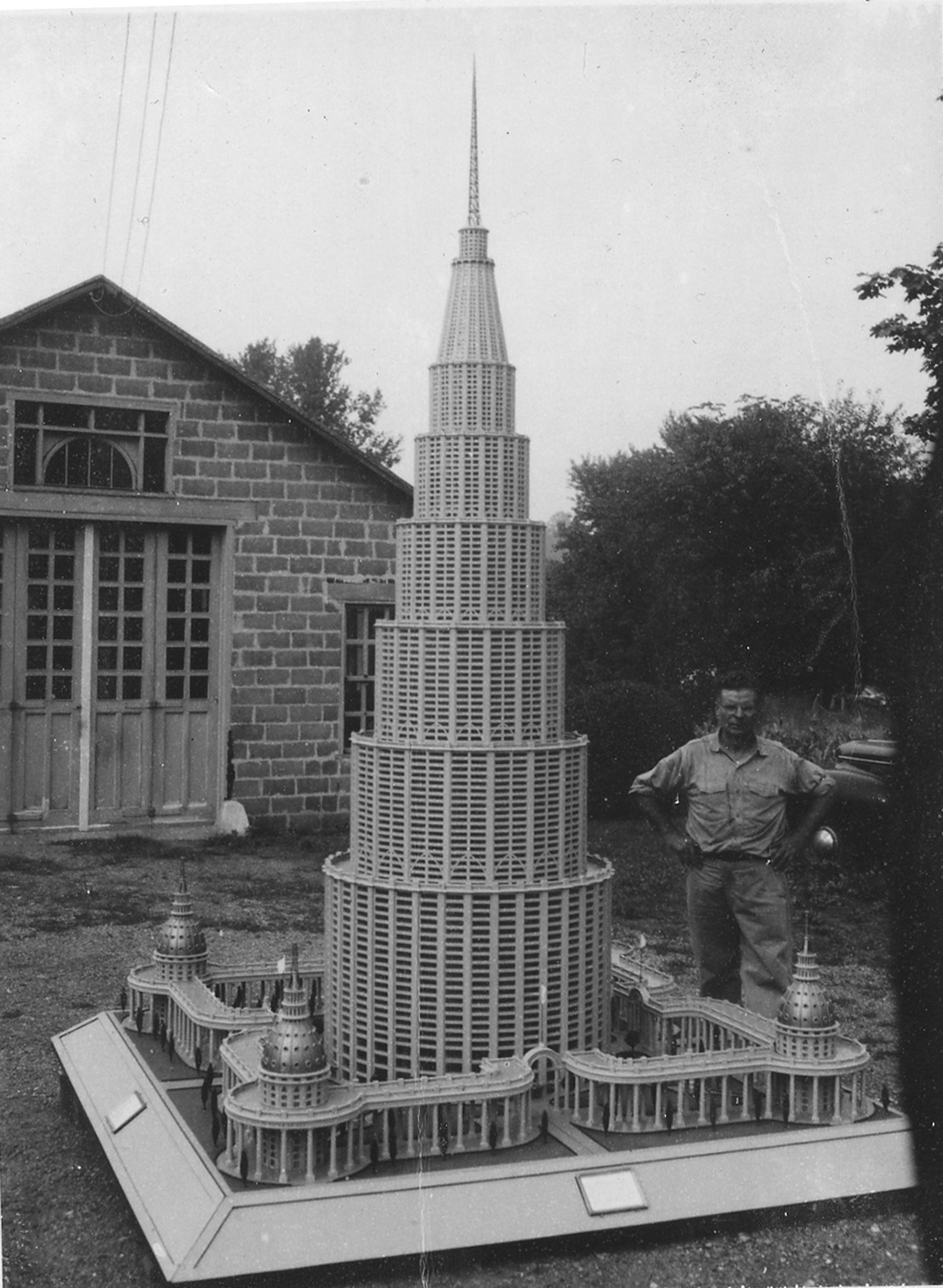
Marino Auriti with the Encyclopedic Palace, Kennett Square, Pennsylvania, 1950s

The Encyclopedic Palace of the World (Il Palazzo Enciclopedico del Mondo) is a mixed media, sculptural model that was created by self-taught Italian-American artist Marino Auriti in the 1950s. Now in the permanent collection of the American Folk Art Museum in New York City, the work came to international attention in 2013 when its name was adopted as the title of the 55th Venice Biennale by curator Massimiliano Gioni.

== Creation of the Work ==
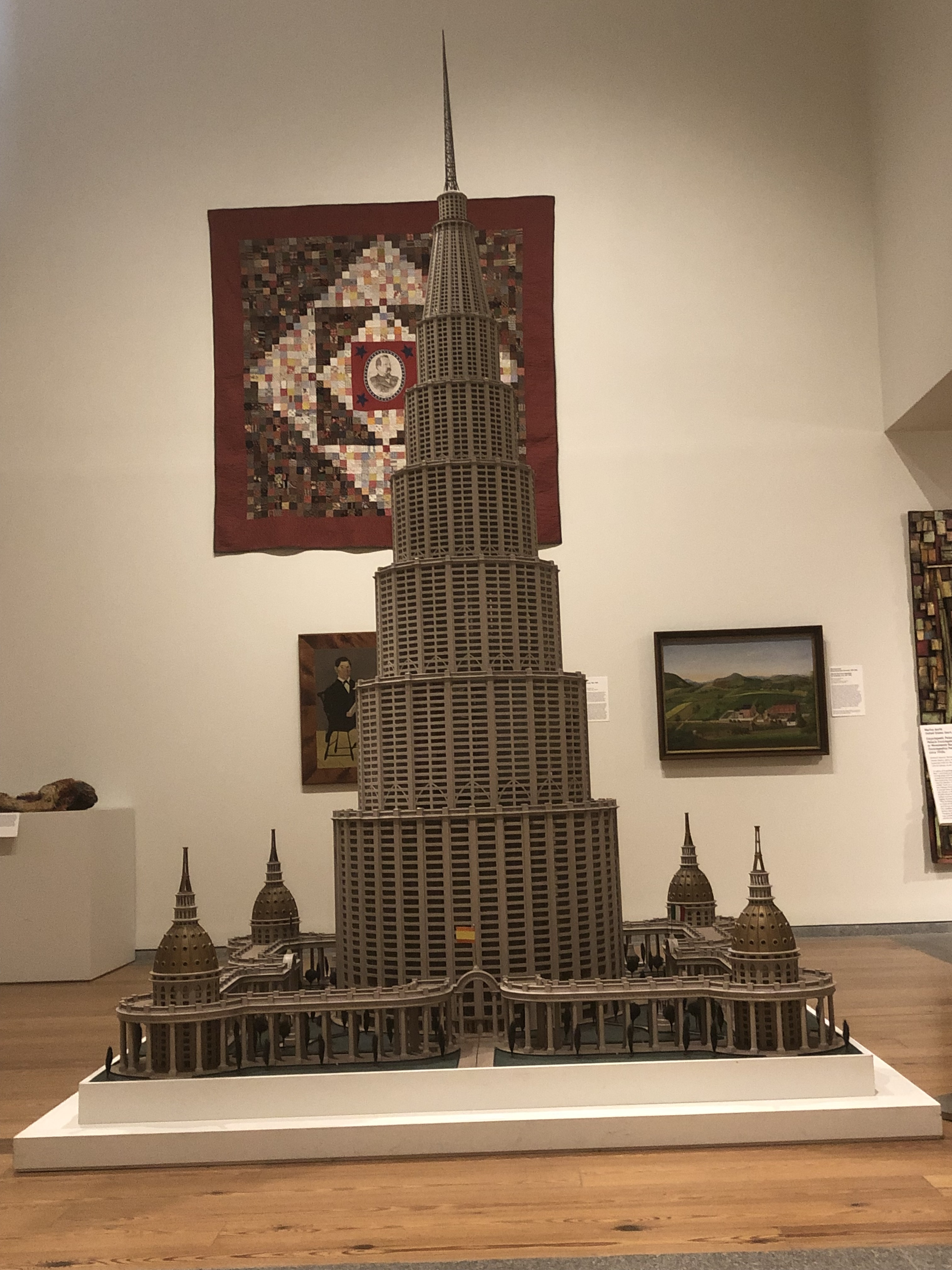
Encyclopedic Palace sculptural model from the American Folk Art Museum

Auriti explained his conception in the following terms: “This building is an entirely new concept in museums, designed to hold all the works of man in whatever field, discoveries made and those which may follow." The artist intended for his concept to be realized by a skyscraper that would soar above the National Mall in Washington D.C. Had The Encyclopedic Palace been constructed, it would have stood 136-storeys and 2,322 feet high, making it the tallest building of its time (only to be surpassed by the Burj Khalifa in 2010).

Auriti, an auto-mechanic by trade in Kennett Square, Pennsylvania, worked on his model of a cylindrical tower for over three years. He constructed it on a 1:200 scale. The model stands 11 feet tall, with a horizontal diameter of 7 feet. It is made of wood, plastic, glass, metal, hair combs, and model kit parts, crowned with the television antenna. Auriti went so far as to acquire a patent and exhibit the model both in a storefront and a bank lobby, but his dream of a tower housing the totality of knowledge and dominating the skyline of the US capital was never realized. Following its debut the work was neglected in a warehouse for decades before entering the collection of the American Folk Art Museum.

== 55th Venice Biennale ==
Auriti's Encyclopedic Palace rose to international prominence in 2013, when Massimiliano Gioni, director of that year's Venice Biennale, appropriated the work's name for the Biennale's title, re-purposing its concept as his own theme. Taking Auriti's encyclopedic architecture as an analog to his own mandate as director of the Biennale, Gioni wrote, " The biennale model itself is based on the impossible desire to concentrate the infinite worlds of contemporary art in a single place: a task that now seems as dizzyingly absurd as Auriti's dream." Gioni explained that his Biennale concept was reflected in the nature of experience: "The personal cosmologies [i.e. 'that eccentrics like Auriti share with many other artists'], with their delusions of omniscience, shed light on the constant challenge of reconciling the self with the universe, the subjective with the collective, the specific with the general, and the individual with the culture of her time. Today, as we grapple with a constant flood of information, such attempts seem even more necessary and even more desperate."

Auriti's original ambition in the 1950s was an expression of straightforward optimism, ingenuous if not naive in its grandiosity, an eccentric if touching case of postwar America's imperial mentality (i.e. an encyclopedic palace of the world in the capital of the United States.) In other words, Gioni gave the artist's Prometheanism a post-modernist twist, emphasizing the "delusive," "desperate," "delirious," "dizzyingly absurd," but nonetheless "necessary" nature of "an image of the world that will capture its infinite variety and richness." Gioni grants that such totalizing visions are "impossible," but still insists that they are "necessary"—a philosophical contradiction that led him to feature many visionary outsider artists in his Biennale.

== See also ==
- Venice Biennale
