= Rožanc Award =

The Rožanc Award (Slovene: Rožančeva nagrada) is a literary award in Slovenia awarded each year for the best collection of essays in Slovene. It has been bestowed since 1993. It is named after the author, playwright and journalist Marjan Rožanc.

== Rožanc Award laureates ==
Year	Author	Essay Collection	Title in English
2015	Andrej Capuder	Povest o knjigah	Tale of Books
2014	Marcel Štefančič	Kdor prej umre, bo dlje mrtev	He Who Dies Early Will Be Dead for Longer
2013	Alojz Ihan	Državljanski eseji	Civic Essays
2012	Meta Kušar	Kaj je poetično ali Ura ilegale	What is Poetic or the Hour of the Underground
2011	Miklavž Komelj	Nujnost poezije	The Need for Poetry
2010	Peter Kovačič Peršin	Vrnitev k Itaki: Slovenci v procesih globalizacije	Return to Ithaka: Slovenes in the Processes of Globalization
2009	Ifigenija Zagoričnik Simonović	Konci in kraji	Bits and Places
2008	Dušan Jovanović	Svet je drama	The World is a Drama
2007	Aleš Šteger	Berlin	Berlin
2007	Igor Zabel	Eseji o moderni in sodobni umetnosti	Essays on Modern and Contemporary Art
2006	Drago Jančar	Duša Evrope	The Soul of Europe
2005	Aleksander Zorn	Smešna žalost preobrazbe	The Funny Sadness of Transformation
2004	Gorazd Kocjančič	Tistim zunaj: Eksoterični zapisi 1990–2003	To Those Outside: Exoteric Notes 1990–2003
2003	Vinko Ošlak	Spoštovanje in bit	Respect and Being
2002	Vinko Möderndorfer	Gledališče v ogledalu	The Theatre in a Mirror
2001	Iztok Geister	Levitve	Moultings
2000	Edvard Kovač	Oddaljena bližina	The Distant Proximity
1999	Milan Dekleva	Gnezda in katedrale	Nests and Cathedrals
1998	Aleš Berger	Krokiji in beležke	Sketches and Notes
1997	Matevž Kos	Prevzetnost in pristranost	Pride and Prejudice
1996	Tomo Virk	Ujetniki bolečine	Prisoners of Pain
1995	Drago Jančar	Egiptovski lonci mesa	Egyptian Pots of Meat
1994	Jože Snoj	Med besedo in bogom	Between the Word and God
1993	Drago Jančar	Razbiti vrč	The Broken Jug
