= Tomo Virk =

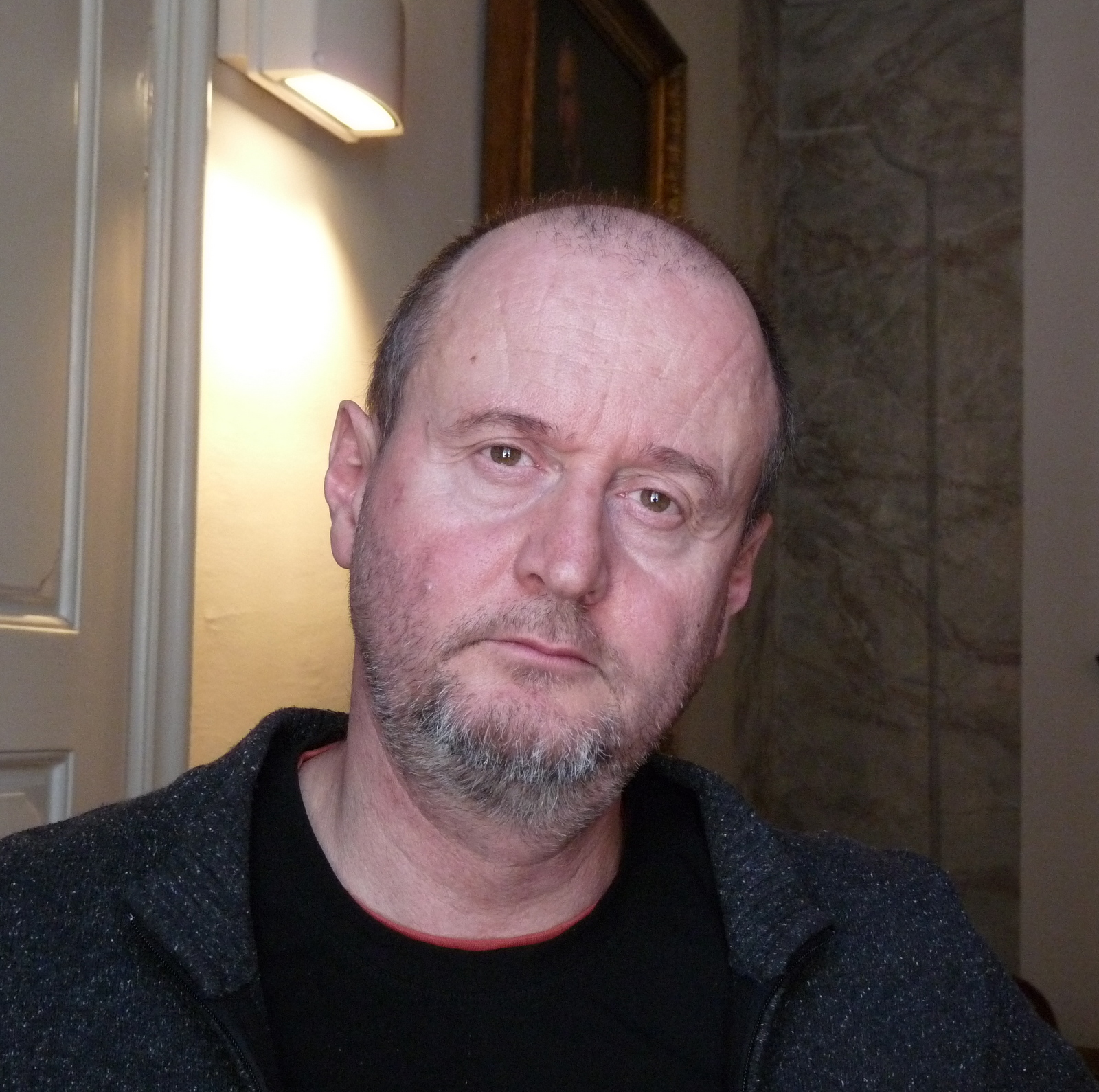
- Born: 31 May 1960; Ljubljana, Socialist Federal Republic of Yugoslavia (now in Slovenia)
- Occupations: Literary historian, literary theorist, essayist and translator
- Writing career
- Notable work: Ujetniki bolečine
- Notable awards: Rožanc Award; 1996 for Ujetniki bolečine

Tomo Virk (born 31 May 1960) is a Slovene literary historian and essayist.

Virk was born in Ljubljana in 1960. He studied Comparative literature and German language at the University of Ljubljana and works as a lecturer at the University. He was head of the Jury for the Kresnik Award between 2004 and 2007. In 1996 he received the Rožanc Award for his book of literary essays Ujetniki bolečine (Prisoners of Pain).

== Published works ==
- Duhovna zgodovina (A Spiritual History), 1989
- Postmoderna in »mlada slovenska proza« (Post-modern or Young Slovene Prose), 1991
- Kratka zgodovina večnosti (A Short History of Eternity), 1993
- Bela dama v labirintu: idejni svet J. L. Borgesa (The White Lady in a Labyrinth: the Conceptual Words of J L Borges), 1994
- Ujetniki bolečine (Prisoners of Pain), 1995
- Tekst in kontekst: eseji o sodobni slovenski prozi (Text and Context : Essays on Contemporary Slovene Prose), 1997 * Premisleki o sodobni slovenski prozi (Thoughts on Contemporary Slovene Prose), 1998
- Moderne metode literarne vede in njihove filozofsko teoretske osnove: metodologija 1 (Modern Literary Methods and their Philosophical and Theoretical Bases: Methodology 1), 1999, 2003, 2008
- Strah pred naivnostjo: poetika postmodernistične proze (Fear of Naivety: The Poetics of Postomodernist Prose), 2000
- Primerjalna književnost na prelomu tisočletja: kritični pregled (Comparative Literature at the Turn of the Millennium: A Critical Overview), 2007
- Izleti čez mejo: razprave o evropski in latinskoameriški prozi (Trips Across the Border: Discussions on European and Latin American Prose), 2008
