= Matevž Kos =

Slovene literary historian and essayist (born 1966)

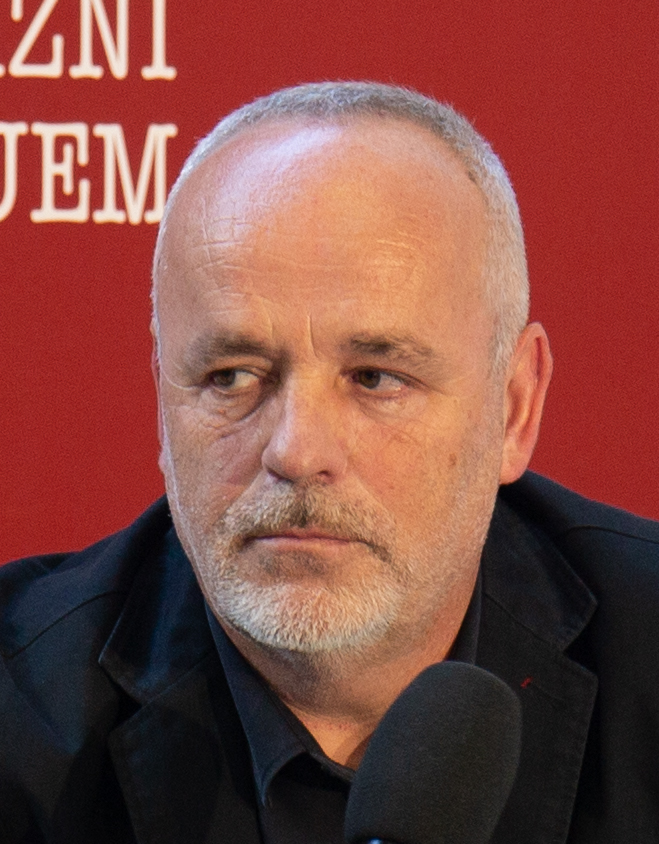
- Matevž Kos at the 2023 Slovenian Book Fair
- Born: 1966 (age 59–60); Ljubljana, Socialist Federal Republic of Yugoslavia (now in Slovenia)
- Occupations: Literary historian and essayist
- Writing career
- Notable work: Prevzetnost in pristranost
- Notable awards: Rožanc Award; 1997 for Prevzetnost in pristranost

Matevž Kos (born 1966) is a Slovene literary historian and essayist.

Kos was born in Ljubljana in 1966. He studied Comparative literature, Literary theory and Philosophy at the University of Ljubljana and works primarily as a literary critic and essayist and lecturer at the University of Ljubljana. He was head of the Jury for the Kresnik Award between 2004 and 2007. In 1997 he received the Rožanc Award for his book of literary essays Prevzetnost in pristranost (Pride and Prejudice).

== Published works ==
- Prevzetnost in pristranost : literarni spisi (Pride and Prejudice: Literary Essays), 1996
- Kritike in refleksije (Critiques and Reflections), 2000
- Poskusi z Nietzschejem : Nietzsche in ničejanstvo v slovenski literaturi (Experiments with Nietzsche: Nietzsche and Nietzschism in Slovene Literature), 2003
- Branje po izbiri (Reading by Choice), 2004
- Fragmenti o celoti: poskusi s slovenskim pesništvom (Fragments about a Whole: Experiments with Slovene Poetry), 2007
