= Venice Festival of Contemporary Music =

The Venice Festival of Contemporary Music (Italian: Festival Internazionale di Musica Contemporanea della Biennale di Venezia, or simply Biennale Musica) is an adjunct of the Venice Biennale festival.

The festival was founded in 1930 as part of the Venice Biennale. Some works by Prokofiev and Stravinsky were premiered at the festival. Among composers featured in the first year were William Walton, Manuel De Falla, Zoltán Kodály, Ernest Bloch, Ferruccio Busoni, Arthur Honegger, and Paul Hindemith.

Excluding interruptions in World War II (1939–45), the festival has continued to the present.
