= Alojz Ihan =

Slovenian doctor and writer (1961–2026)

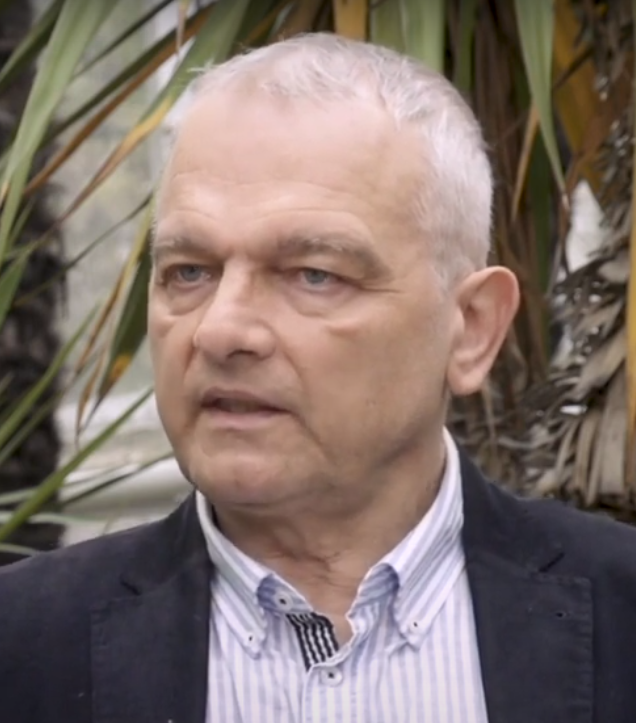
- Ihan in 2022
- Born: 23 July 1961; Ljubljana, PR Slovenia, FPR Yugoslavia (now Slovenia)
- Died: 10 March 2026 (aged 64)
- Occupations: Doctor, microbiologist, immunologist, poet and writer
- Writing career
- Language: Slovene
- Notable works: Srebrnik, Južno dekle, Državljanski eseji
- Notable awards: Prešeren Foundation Award; 1987 for Srebrnik; Jenko Award; 1996 for Južno dekle Rožanc Award; 2013 for Državljanski eseji

Alojz Ihan (23 July 1961 – 10 March 2026) was a Slovenian doctor who was a specialist in medical microbiology and immunology. Beside his medical profession, he was also a poet, writer, essayist and editor.

== Life and career ==
Ihan was born in Ljubljana on 23 July 1961 and studied at the Medical Faculty at the University of Ljubljana. He worked at the university's Institute for Microbiology and Immunology. He was also known for his poetry and regularly published essays and opinions in Slovene newspapers and journals. He received the Prešeren Foundation Award for his poetry collection Srebrnik (Silver Coin) in 1987 and in 1996 won the Jenko Award for his poetry collection Južno dekle (Southern Girl). In 2013, he won the prestigious Rožanc Award for his book Civic Essays (Državljanski eseji). The book however received a mixed reception, with some critics denouncing its populist tone and weak arguments.

Ihan died on 10 March 2026, at the age of 64.

== Poetry ==
- Srebrnik (Silver Coin), 1985
- Igralci pokra (Poker Players), 1989
- Pesmi (Poems), 1989
- Ritem (Rhythm), 1993
- Južno dekle (Southern Girl), 1995
- Salsa (Salsa), 2003

== Novels ==
- Hiša (House), 1997
- Romanje za dva … in psa (Pilgrimage for Two ... and a Dog), 1998
- Hvalnica rešnjemu telesu (Ode to the Most Holy Body), 2011
- "Slike z razstave" (Pictures at an Exhibition), 2013

== Collection of Essays ==
- Platon pri zobozdravniku (Plato at the Dentist), 1997
- Deset božjih zapovedi (Ten Holy Commandments), 2000
- "Državljanski eseji" (Civic Essays), 2012

== Popular science ==
- Imunski sistem in odpornost: kako se ubranimo bolezni (The Immune System and Immunity: How to Avoid Falling Ill), 2000
- Do odpornosti z glavo (To Immunity by Using Your Head ), 2003
- Prebujanje: Psiha v iskanju izgubljenega Erosa - psihonevroimunologija, 2014

== Scientific publications ==
- Klinična uporaba analize limfocitnih populacij s pretočnim citometrom (The Clinical Use of Flow Cytometry Analysis in Lymphocyte Cultures), 1999
