= Peter Kovačič Peršin =

Slovenian writer and theologian (born 1945)

- Born: 1945 (age 80–81)
- Occupations: Theologian and writer
- Writing career
- Notable work: Vrnitev k Itaki
- Notable awards: Rožanc Award; 2010 for Vrnitev k Itaki; Golden Order of Merit; 2011 for his written work

Peter Kovačič Peršin (born 1945) is a Slovenian writer and theologian. His second surname, Peršin, is his mother's. His was one of the founding members of the philosophical and social movement The 2000 Society (Slovene: Društvo 2000) and editor of its journal Revija 2000.

In 2010 he received the Rožanc Award for his collection of essays Vrnitev k Itaki: Slovenci v procesih globalizacije (Return to Ithaca: Slovenes in the Processes of Globalization). In 2011 he was bestowed the Golden Order of Merit by the President of Slovenia for his free thinking in his editorial work with which he has persistently and decisively widened the intellectual horizons of the Slovene spirit.
