= Aleš Berger =

Slovene writer, translator and literary critic

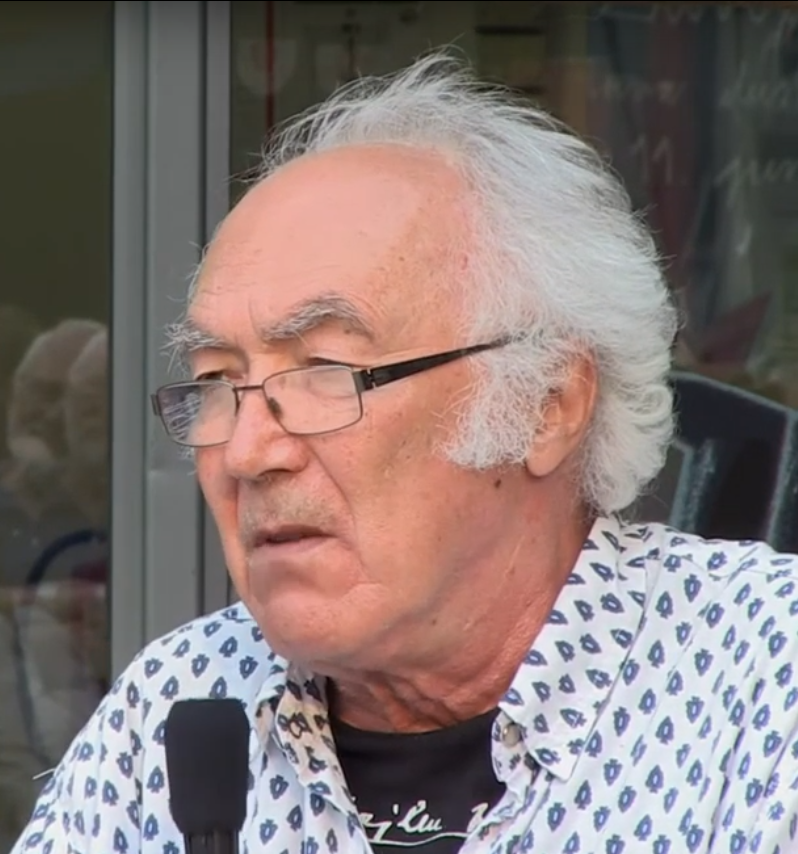
- Aleš Berger in 2019
- Born: 18 September 1946 (age 79); Ljubljana, Socialist Federal Republic of Yugoslavia (now in Slovenia)
- Occupations: Writer, translator, literary and theatre critic
- Writing career
- Notable work: Krokiji in beležke
- Notable awards: Prešeren Foundation Award; 1987 for his translation of Les Chants de Maldoror; Rožanc Award; 1998 for Krokiji in beležke Prešeren Award; 2017 for lifetime achievement

Aleš Berger (born 18 September 1946) is a Slovene writer, translator and literary critic.

Berger was born in Ljubljana in 1946. He studied comparative literature and French at the University of Ljubljana and worked as an editor and theatre critic. He is known for his translations into Slovene from French (Lautréamont, Apollinaire, Beckett, René Char, Raymond Queneau and Jacques Prévert) and Spanish (Jorge Luis Borges).

In 1987 he received the Prešeren Foundation Award for his translation of Les Chants de Maldoror. In 1998 he received the Rožanc Award for Krokiji in beležke (Sketches and Notes).

In February 2017, he received the Prešeren Award for lifetime achievement in translation. In particular, he has translated eminent French writers and poets, his favourite being the poet Jacques Prévert (1900–1977).

== Published works ==
- Omara v kleti (Drawer in the Cellar), essay, 2010
- Zmenki (Dates), drama, 2006
- Zagatne zgodbe (Embarrassing Tales), short stories, 2004
- Krokiji in beležke (Sketches and Notes), essays, 1998
- Novi ogledi in pogledi (New Views and Viewings), theatre criticisms, 1997
- Ogledi in pogledi (Views and Viewings), theatre criticisms, 1984
- Gledališki besednjak (A Theatrical Glossary), 1981
- Dadaizem in nadrealizem (Dadaism and Surrealism), 1981
