= Aleksander Zorn =

Slovene politician, historian, and dramaturge (born 1947)

- Born: 5 May 1947; Maribor, Socialist Federal Republic of Yugoslavia (now in Slovenia)
- Occupations: Politician, literary historian and editor
- Writing career
- Notable awards: Rožanc Award; 2005 for Smešna žalost preobrazbe

Aleksander Zorn (born 5 May 1947) is a Slovene literary historian, editor and politician. Between 2008 and 2011 he was a member of the Slovenian National Assembly. Ever since his student days he has also been involved in a variety of cultural activities and editorial work.

Zorn was born in Maribor. He studied Comparative literature at the University of Ljubljana. He worked as a dramaturge at various experimental theatres in the 1970s and early 1980s and as an editor at Nova revija and Mladinska Knjiga.

In 2005 he received the Rožanc Award for his collection of essays Smešna žalost preobrazbe (The Funny Sadness of Transformation).
