= Janez Kocijančič =

Slovene politician (1941–2020)

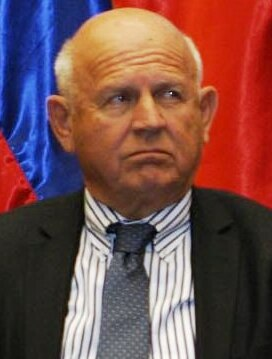

1st President of the Slovenian Olympic Committee
- In office October 15, 1991 – December 16, 2014
- Preceded by: Office established
- Succeeded by: Bogdan Gabrovec

Personal details
- Born: October 20, 1941 Ljubljana, Kingdom of Italy
- Died: June 1, 2020 (aged 78) Ljubljana, Slovenia
- Occupation: Politician, lawyer

Janez Kocijančič (October 20, 1941 – June 1, 2020) was a Slovene politician and lawyer. He was also the president of the Slovenian Olympic Committee from 1991 to 2014.

== Education and early career ==
Janez Kocijančič received his bachelor's degree in 1965, his master's degree in 1974, and his doctorate in 2010 at the University of Ljubljana's Faculty of Law. His dissertation was titled Pravna doktrina in praksa na področju športa v Evropski uniji (Legal Doctrine and Practice in Sports in the European Union). He served as the chair of the University Committee of the University of Ljubljana Student Union (1961–1963), president of the Central Committee of the League of Youth of Slovenia (1966–1968) and president of the League of Youth of Yugoslavia (1968–1971). He was a minister in the government of Stane Kavčič. As a close ally of Kavčič, he was removed from the political scene after the fall of the Kavčič government in 1973. After that, he worked in business, first managing the company Interexport, and then from 1982 to 1993 as the director of Adria Airways.

== Return to politics ==
Kocijančič returned to politics in the 1980s, which were marked by the more liberal policies of the League of Communists. He worked closely with Milan Kučan. Kocijančič took up the cause of the rights of the Albanian population in Kosovo. In 1993, the former League of Communists of Slovenia (Zveza komunistov Slovenije)—initially renamed the Party of Democratic Renewal (Stranka demokratične prenove, SDP) and then Social Democratic Renewal, Socialdemokratska prenova, SDP)—joined the Workers' Party of Slovenia (Delavska stranka Slovenije), the Social Democratic Union (Socialdemokratska unija, SDU), and two groups from the Socialist Party and the Democratic Party of Pensioners of Slovenia to create the United List of Social Democrats (Združena lista socialnih demokratov, ZLSD), and Kocijančič was elected the party's leader. He did not run for head of the party after his term expired in 1997 because the party had not performed well in the elections, being succeeded by Borut Pahor.

In 1993 Kocijančič became a member of the first National Assembly when he replaced Rado Bohinc, who had been appointed to a ministerial position. During that term he was a member of the following working bodies until February 7, 1996 and after May 28, 1996: the Committee on Finance and Monetary Policy, the Committee on International Relations, and the Committee on Internal Policy and Justice. In 2004 he was a co-founder of the political association Forum 21.

== Sports ==
From 1974 to 1984, Kocijančič was the president of the Ski Association of Slovenia, and from 1984 to 1988 of the Ski Association of Yugoslavia. During this time of the greatest success of Slovene skiers in the world, he worked closely with Tone Vogrinc. Kocijančič became a member of the council of the International Ski Organization (FIS) from 1981 onward, and he became its vice-president in 2010.

From 1991 to 2014, Kocijančič served six terms as the president of the Slovenian Olympic Committee, and after 2005 he was also a member of the Executive Board of the European Olympic Committees (EOC). From 2013 to 2016, he was vice-president of the European Olympic Committees, and in 2017 he was unanimously elected its president.

== Family ==
Kocijančič was the son of Boris Kocijančič (1909–1968)—an interwar politician, Partisan, and minister in the postwar communist government—and Krista Kocijančič (née Pestotnik, 1916–2011), a pediatrician. He was married to the physician Andreja Kocijančič (1942–2021), and he was the father of the philosopher Gorazd Kocijančič and the university professor Nike Kocijančič Pokorn.

== Awards ==
– Bloudek award (1985), the highest award in Slovenia for achievements in sports
– Kraigher award (1990), the highest award in Slovenia for achievements in business (1990)
– King Olav Trophy (King Olav Trophy) (2014)
– Honorary citizen of Ljubljana (2018)
– Silver Olympic Order (2020, posthumously)
– Honorary president of the Ski Association of Slovenia (2020, posthumously)
– European Olympic Committees Order of Merit (2020, posthumously)
