= Marino Auriti =

American sculptor

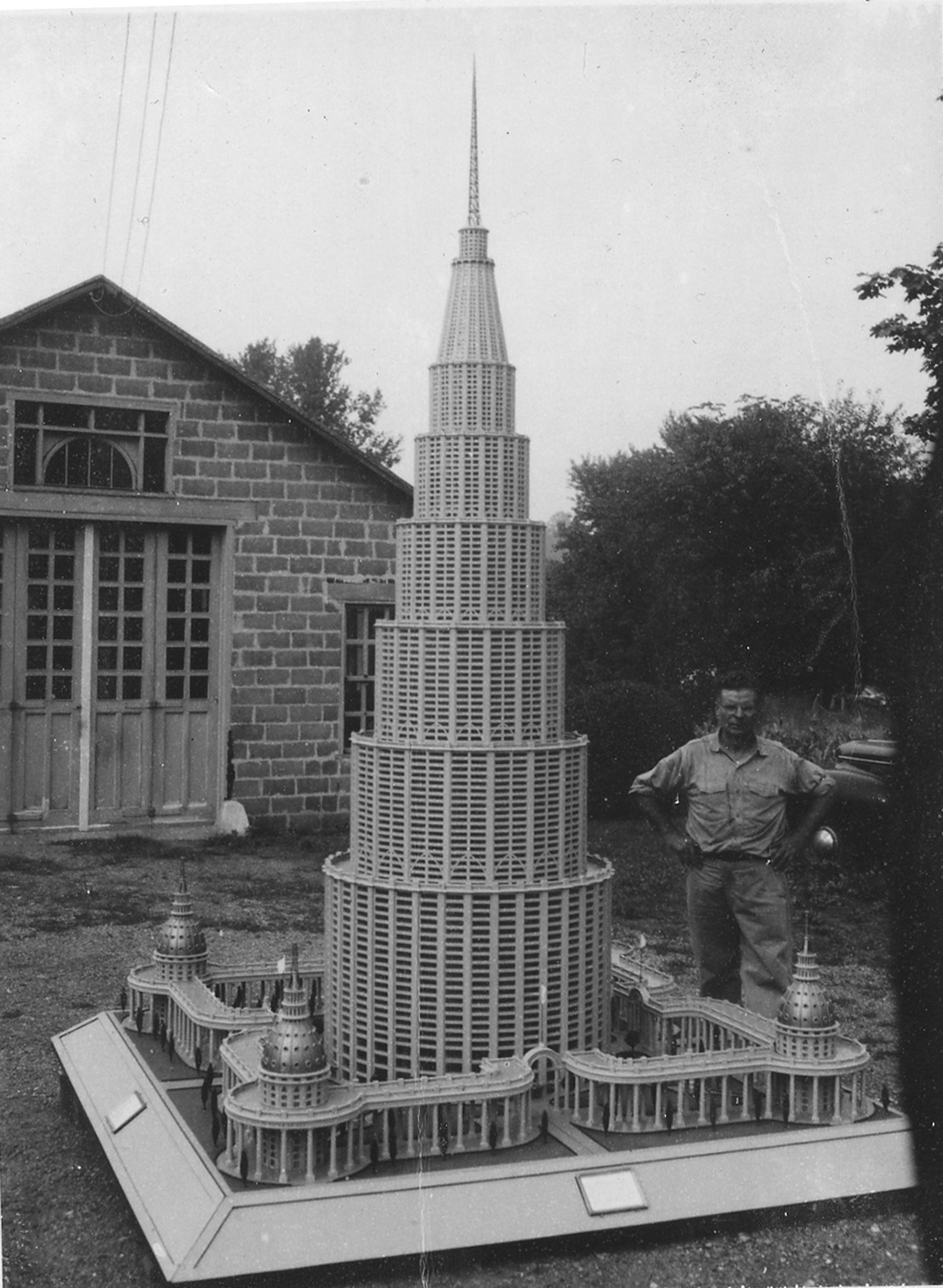
- Marino Auriti with the Encyclopedic Palace, Kennett Square, Pennsylvania, 1950s
- Born: 1891
- Died: 1980 (aged 88–89)
- Occupations: Mechanic, artist

Marino Auriti (1891–1980) was an Italian-born American self-taught artist. An auto-mechanic by trade, Auriti is best known for his 1950s architectural model The Encyclopedic Palace of the World. Auriti designed Encyclopedic Palace/Palazzo Enciclopedico/Palacio Enciclopedico/Palais Encyclopédique or Monumento Nazionale. Progetto Enciclopedico Palazzo (U.S. patent no. 179,277) to house the entirety of worldly knowledge and human discovery: "all the works of man in whatever field, discoveries made and those which may follow."

While the building Auriti envisioned was never realized, posthumously his architectural model has had a profound effect. In 2013, the model served as the centerpiece for the Venice Biennale. As part of the permanent collection of the American Folk Art Museum, The Encyclopedic Palace is currently on view in Self-Taught Genius: Treasures from the American Folk Art Museum.

== Life and work ==
Born in 1891 in Guardiagrele, Italy, Auriti briefly studied architecture as a young boy. While an enduring love of architecture continued throughout his life, he developed his craft as a carriage maker. As a young man, he met and married his wife, Maria Rachele.

World War I and the ensuring rise of Fascism soon interrupted Auriti's idyllic life. In 1915, Italy joined the Great War and Auriti enlisted as an infantryman. Afterwards, Auriti became a vehement critic of the Italian Fascist Party – a decision which ultimately prompted his immigration.

After publishing a series of satirical anti-Fascist poems in the local paper, Auriti was publicly harassed by party members. He was "forced to drink castor oil in the streets by Blackshirt goon squad." In the late 1920s, after the party had taken over the family's house in Guardiagrele, Auriti, his brother, and their families left Italy.

While the family had set their sights on the United States, US immigration restrictions necessitated that they settle down in Catanduva, a city near São Paulo, Brazil. There Auriti went to work building coffee bean threshers. With the Brazilian coffee market crashing in 1929, the career was short-lived.

In 1938, Auriti, his wife, and their young daughter, who was born in 1928, moved to the United States. The family eventually settled in Kennett Square in southeastern Pennsylvania. Auriti set up an auto-body shop, where he also promoted "artistic framing" business. For Auriti the garage served as a site for all his creative projects: oil paintings of old masters and of photographs of National Geographic, and most importantly, his great architectural undertaking: The Encyclopedic Palace.

=== The Encyclopedic Palace ===
Auriti assembled his famed architectural model over the course of three years, after he retired in the 1950s. His model is made up of wood, plastic, metal, hair combs and other model-making kit parts. It is topped with a television antennae. Standing at eleven feet high, the model sits on a base of seven feet by seven feet.

Imagined on a 1:200 scale, The Encyclopedic Palace was designed to stand 2,300 feet tall and occupy 16 city blocks. It would have been the tallest skyscraper in the world. With his sights set on "The Mall" in Washington D.C, Auriti envisioned a grand monument to knowledge. One hundred and twenty six bronze statues of 'writers, scientists, and artist past, present, and future,' as well as four domed laboratories on each corner were to be included in the construction. Inscribed on the surrounding friezes, Auriti included axioms like, "Forgive the First time," "Enjoy liberty but don't hurt anyone," and "Do Not Abuse Generosity." For Auriti, the Palace was meant to inspire – and to teach.

To accompany the model, Auriti authored a statement of purpose, in which he detailed the building's construction, as well as his philosophical yearnings. He announced that his building was "an entirely new concept in museums, designed to hold all the works of man in whatever field, discoveries made and those which may follow…everything from the wheel to the satellite."

Indeed, Auriti's plans for The Encyclopedic Palace were as audacious as his model and mission statement. While Auriti's calls for funds to realize his buildings remained unanswered, the model, itself, was exhibited twice during his lifetime. In 1955, it was included in the Kennett Square Centennial. The Western Savings Fund Society, a historic bank in downtown Philadelphia, also exhibited it three years later.

The Encyclopedic Palace remained cloistered in Auriti's garage until well after his death in 1980. After many years of searching for a permanent home for the model, his granddaughter donated it to the American Folk Art Museum in 2003. It remains in its permanent collection.

== 2013 Venice Biennale: The Encyclopedic Palace ==
In 2013, Massimiliano Gioni featured the Encyclopedia Palace as the 2013 Venice Biennale's centerpiece. For Gioni, Auriti's architectural plans encapsulated "the impossible desire to see and know everything."

Gioni later commented: "Auriti's plan was never carried out, of course, but the dream of universal, all-embracing knowledge crops up throughout history, as one that eccentrics like Auriti share with many other artists, writers, scientists, and prophets who have tried—often in vain—to fashion an image of the world that will capture its infinite variety and richness. Today, as we grapple with a constant flood of information, such attempts to structure knowledge into all-inclusive systems seem even more necessary and even more desperate."

With Auriti's utopian plans as its thematic framework, the 2013 Biennale brought together professional and self-taught artists from around the world. Through his self-described "magnum opus," Auriti had reached the international stage.
