= Gorazd Kocijančič =

Philosopher, poet, and translator

- Born: 17 September 1964 (age 61); Ljubljana, Socialist Republic of Slovenia, Socialist Federal Republic of Yugoslavia
- Occupations: Philosopher, poet, and translator
- Writing career
- Notable works: Mediations (1996), Between the East and the West: Four Contributions to the Ecstatics (2004), To Those Outside: Exoteric Writings 1990-2003 (2004), The breaking. Seven radical essays (2009), Erotics, politics etc. Three essays about soul (2011)
- Notable awards: Prešeren Fund Award; 2013 for poetry Rožanc Award; 2011 To Those Outside: Exoteric Writings 1990-2003 Sovre Prize; 2005 for translation
- Website: versopolis.com/poet/14/gorazd-kocijani kud-logos.si/tag/gorazd-kocijancic

Gorazd Kocijančič (born 17 September 1964) is a freelance Slovene philosopher, poet and translator. Kocijančič is well known for his translation of the entire corpus of Plato's work into Slovene.

== Selected publications ==
Kocijančič has published over 360 works, since 1987.

=== Notable works ===
- Mediations, 1996
- Between the East and the West: Four Contributions to the Ecstatics, 2004
- To Those Outside: Exoteric Writings 1990-2003, 2004
- The breaking. Seven radical essays, 2009
- Erotics, politics etc. Three essays about soul, 2011

=== Books ===
In his book Mediations (1996), Kocijančič expressed his understanding of a contemporary Christian philosophy stemming from the idea of a radical apophatic thought. In his book Between the East and the West: Four Contributions to the Ecstatics (2004) he formulated his understanding of the relationship between different spiritual traditions and the metaontology, gnoseology, ethics and ecclesiology of the supraconfessional, Eastern-Western Christianity. His work To Those Outside: Exoteric Writings 1990-2003 (2004), is a collection of short newspaper articles, columns and book reviews published in various journals and newspapers, in which he comments on current events, newly published books and artistic events from the perspective of his anarchic philosophy of culture. For this work he received the Rožanc Award the same year it was published.

=== Translations ===
Kocijančič has translated into Slovene (and written upon) a Pre-Socratic verse composition from Ancient Greek by the poet and thinker Parmenides (Parmenides: Fragments 1995) and The Elements of Theology by Proclus (1999). He translated and commented upon complete works of Plato (2004). He has also worked on the New standard translation of the Bible into Slovene by providing translation of and commentary to the Gospels and certain deuterocanonical books of Old Testament and the revision of the entire New Testament, and translated and annotated numerous patristic works such as Thoughts of the Greek Fathers on Prayer (1993), The Wisdom of the Desert (1994), Apostolic Fathers (1996), Gregory of Nyssa: Life of Macrina, Dialogue On the Soul and Resurrection (1996), Logos in Defence of the Truth: Selected Writings by the Early Christian Apologists (1998), Maximus the Confessor: Selected Works (2000). His last work is translation of the complete works of Dionysius the Areopagite (2009) and Boethius’ Consolation of Philosophy (2012). With others he also edited and translated Meister Eckhart's Sermons and Treatises (1996) and edited the translation of a series of books on history of medieval philosophy.

=== Poetry ===
His collection of poetry Your names (2000) was published bilingually with an English translation. His other three collections are Thirty steps and We’re gone (2005), Certamen spirituale (2008) and Primož Trubar is leaving Ljubljana (2012). Many of his poems are translated in various languages and included in anthologies of Slovene poetry.

== Other interests ==
His other interests include nineteenth-century thought; for example he translated V. Solovyov's Spiritual foundations of life (2000), and provided an introduction to it titled "The Subject and the Doctrine and contemporary currents of philosophical thought". He also translated E. Lévinas Time and the Other (1998), and wrote an introduction to it with the title "Other time? Different Other? Phenomenology as a hermeneutical problem".

Besides translating philosophical and theological texts and writing poetry, he has also been involved in literary translation. He has translated from Hebrew a selection of poems by the most renowned Hebrew poets of the Middle Ages; Judah ben Samuel Halevi's: Selected Poems (1998), Solomon ibn Gabirol's Crown of the Kingdom (2011). From German he has translated Rilke's Marienleben und Stundenbuch, and with Vid Snoj poems by Angelus Silesius and Paul Celan. From French he has translated Paul Claudel's Cent phrases pour l’eventail and Charles Peguy. He also edited and translated an anthology of Christian Greek poetry Athos - The Dividing Line Between Heaven and the Earth.

In 1997 he edited the journal "Tretji dan" and contributed to it until 2000, he was also an editor of its book collection. Later he founded the international multilingual electronic journal for culture and spirituality "Logos" Currently he is working on his own philosophical system: the first, ontological part, was published under title Razbitje. Sedem radikalnih esejev (2009), and the second under title Erotics, politics etc. Three essays on the soul (2011).

== Personal life ==
Gorazd Kocijančič was born in Ljubljana, Slovenia (then part of Yugoslavia) to Janez Kocijančič and Andreja Kocijančič, an ex-rector of University of Ljubljana. In 1986 he finished the study of philosophy and Greek on Faculty of Philosophy in Ljubljana and soon got a job as a librarian in a manuscript department of the National and University Library of Slovenia. Since 2008 he maintains a status of a "self-employed in culture". He translates from 10 languages (e.g. Greek, Latin and Hebrew). Beside his own works he has collaborated in translation of standard slovene translation of the Bible and has translated and commented on many Church Fathers (e.g. Apostolic Fathers, apologetes, Origen, Evagrius Ponticus, Gregory of Nyssa, Dionysius the Areopagite, and Maximus the Confessor.

=== Bibliography ===
- Origen, Gregory of Nyssa, Evagrius Ponticus, Maximus the Confessor (1993). Grški očetje o molitvi : Origen, sv. Gregor iz Nise, Evagrij Pontski, sv. Maksim Spoznavalec [Thoughts of the Greek Fathers on Prayer] (in Slovenian). Translated by Gorazd Kocijančič. Mohorjeva družba. ISBN 86-7577-096-0.
- Modrost puščave : izbrani izreki puščavskih očetov [The Wisdom of the Desert] (in Slovenian). Translated by Gorazd Kocijančič. Župnijski urad Ljubljana-Dravlje. 1994.
- Parmenides (1995). Fragmenti [Fragments] (in Slovenian). Translated by Gorazd Kocijančič. Obzorja. ISBN 86-377-0752-1.
- Kocijančič, Gorazd (1996). Mediations.
- Meister Eckhart (1995). Pridige in traktati [Sermons and Treatises] (in Slovenian). Translated by Gorazd Kocijančič. Mohorjeva družba. ISBN 961-218-111-X.
- Gregory of Nyssa (1996). Življenje svete Makrine. Razgovor o duši in vstajenju [Life of Macrina, Dialogue On the Soul and Resurrection] (in Slovenian). Translated by Gorazd Kocijančič. Mohorjeva družba. ISBN 961-218-123-3.
- Spisi apostolskih očetov [Apostolic Fathers] (in Slovenian). Translated by Gorazd Kocijančič. Mohorjeva družba. 1996. ISBN 961-218-133-0.
- Proclus (1997). Prvine bogoslovja [The Elements of Theology] (in Slovenian). Translated by Gorazd Kocijančič. Nova revija. ISBN 961-6017-74-8.
- Kocijančič, Gorazd (1998). Logos v obrambo resnice : izbrani spisi zgodnjih krščanskih apologetov [Logos in Defence of the Truth: Selected Writings by the Early Christian Apologists] (in Slovenian). Mohorjeva družba.
- Emmanuel Levinas (1998). Etika in neskončno. Čas in drugi [Time and the Other] (in Slovenian). Translated by Gorazd Kocijačič. Družina. ISBN 961-222-177-4.
- Maximus the Confessor (2000). Izbrani spisi [Selected Works] (in Slovenian). Translated by Gorazd Kocijančič. Mohorjeva družba. ISBN 961-218-330-9.
- Kocijančič, Gorazd (2000). Tvoja imena [Your names] (in Slovenian). Društvo SKAM. ISBN 961-90167-8-5.
- Vladimir Solovyov (2000). Duhovne osnove življenja [Spiritual foundations of life] (in Slovenian). Translated by Gorazd Kocijačič. Društvo SKAM. ISBN 961-6385-01-1.
- Kocijančič, Gorazd (2004). Med Vzhodom in Zahodom : štirje prispevki k ekstatiki [Between the East and the West: Four Contributions to the Ecstatics] (in Slovenian). Kud Logos. ISBN 961-6519-00-X.
- Kocijančič, Gorazd (2004). Tistim zunaj : eksoterični zapisi 1990-2003 [To Those Outside: Exoteric Writings 1990-2003] (in Slovenian). Kud Logos. ISBN 961-6519-01-8.
- Kocijančič, Gorazd (2005). Trideset stopnic in naju ni [Thirty steps and We’re gone] (in Slovenian). Literarno-umetniško društvo Literatura. ISBN 961-6098-66-7.
- Rainer Maria Rilke (2006). Marijino življenje (in Slovenian). Translated by Gorazd Kocijančič. KUD Logos. ISBN 978-961-6519-16-8.
- Dionysius the Areopagite (2008). Zbrani spisi. Translated by Gorazd Kocijančič. Slovenska matica. ISBN 978-961-213-181-4.
- Kocijačič, Gorazd (2008). Certamen spirituale (in Slovenian). Študentska založba. ISBN 978-961-242-151-9.
- Kocijančič, Gorazd (2009). Razbitje : sedem radikalnih esejev [The breaking. Seven radical essays] (in Slovenian). Študentska založba. ISBN 978-961-242-231-8.
- Solomon ibn Gabirol (2010). Krona kraljestva [Crown of the Kingdom] (in Slovenian). Translated by Gorazd Kocijančič. KUD Logos. ISBN 978-961-6519-52-6.
- Kocijančič, Gorazd (2011). Erotika, politika itn. : trije poskusi o duši [Erotics, politics etc. Three essays about soul] (in Slovenian). Slovenska matica. ISBN 978-961-213-211-8.
- Boethius (2012). Tolažba filozofije (in Slovenian). Translated by Gorazd Kocijančič. Narodna in univerzitetna knjižnica. ISBN 978-961-6551-44-1.
- Kocijančič, Gorazd (2012). Primož Trubar zapušča Ljubljano [Primož Trubar is leaving Ljubljana] (in Slovenian). Študentska založba. ISBN 978-961-242-437-4.
