= Česká spořitelna =

Czech bank

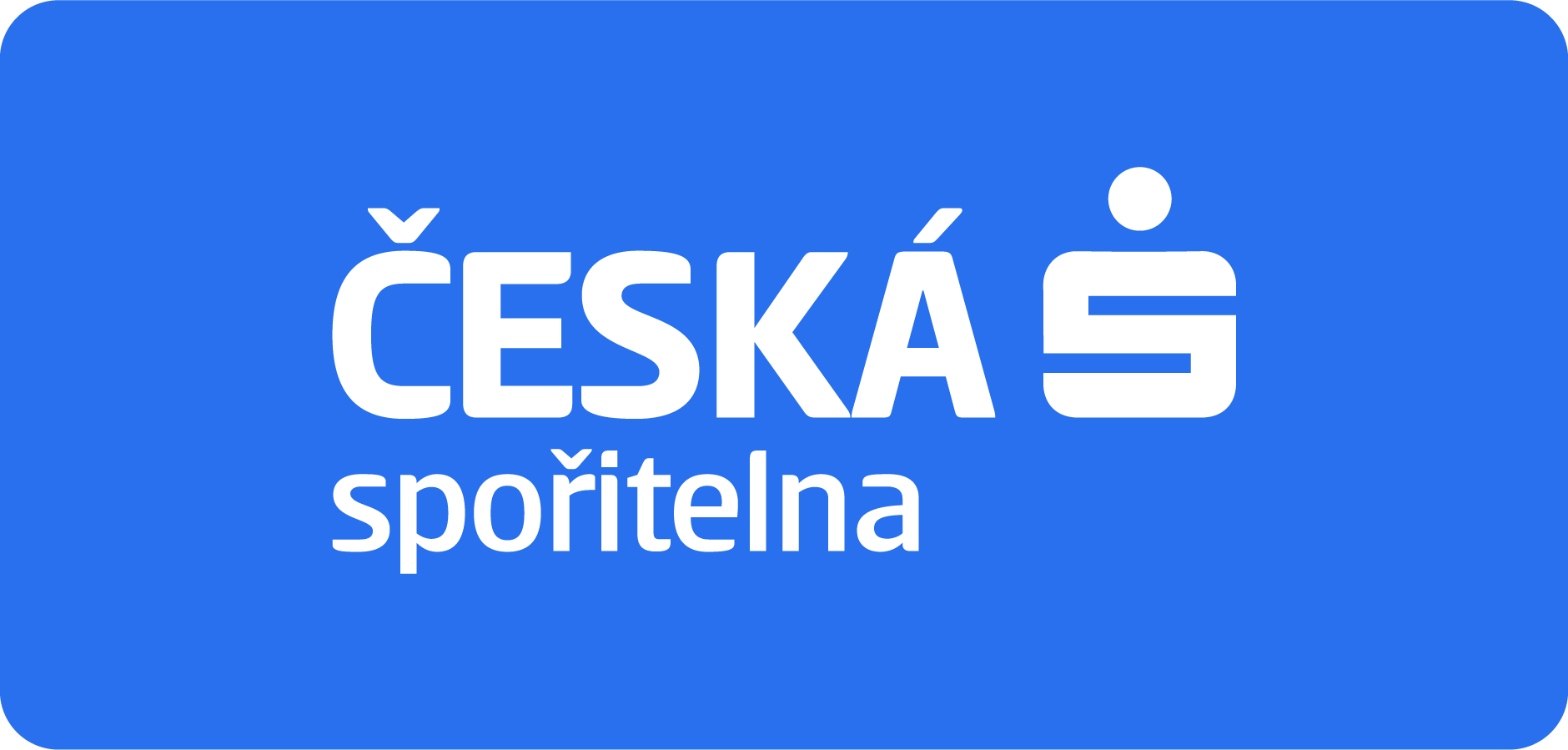

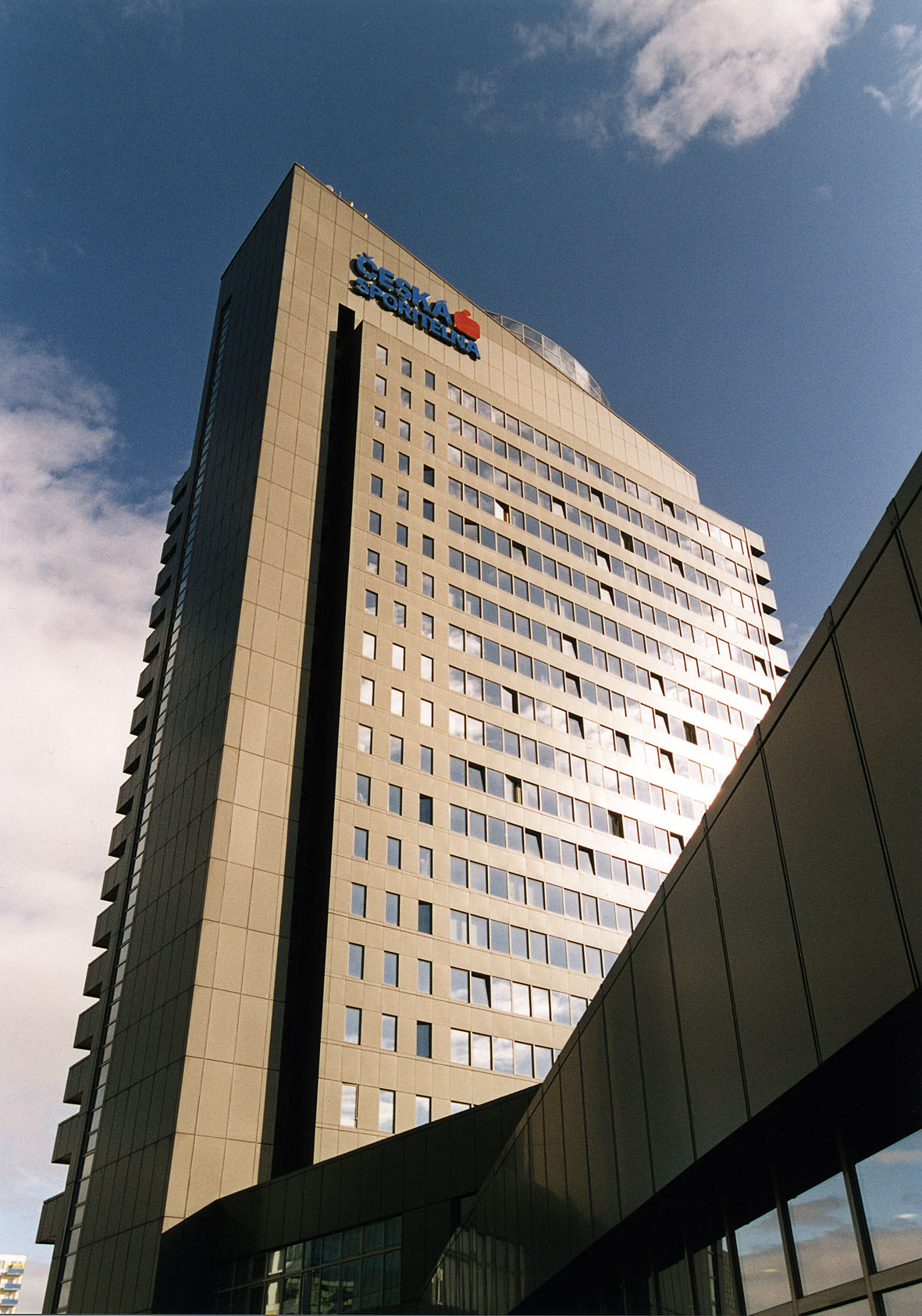
- Head office in Prague
- Native name: Česká spořitelna, a.s.
- Company type: Akciová společnost
- Industry: Bank
- Founded: February 12, 1825 (symbolically); March 13, 1825 (first directors elected)
- Headquarters: Prague, Czech Republic
- Key people: Tomáš Salomon (CEO)
- Revenue: 59,160,000,000 Czech koruna (2025)
- Operating income: 33,900,000,000 Czech koruna (2025)
- Net income: 27,800,000,000 Czech koruna (2025)
- Total assets: 2,038,533,000,000 Czech koruna (2025)
- Owner: Erste Group
- Number of employees: 9,829 (2023)
- Parent: Erste Group
- Website: csas.cz

Česká spořitelna (literally "Czech Savings Bank") is a Czech bank, headquartered in Prague. Despite being organized as a joint-stock bank, it is the heir to a long history of savings banks in the Czech Republic, going back to the establishment of Böhmische Sparkasse (literally "Bohemian Savings Bank") in 1825. Since the early 21st century, it has been part of the Vienna-headquartered Erste Group.

== History ==
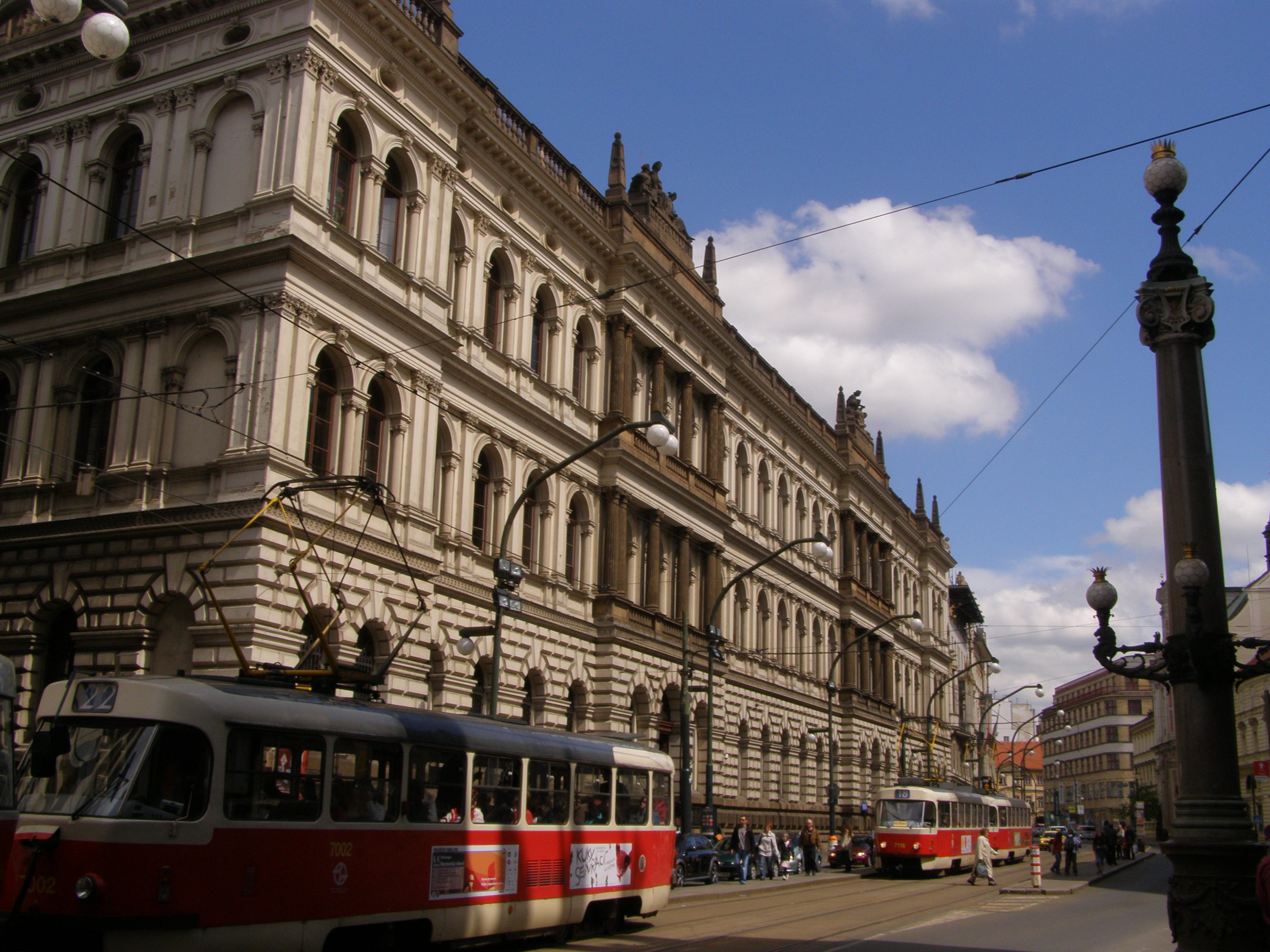
Former head office of the Böhmische Sparkasse, lately the seat of the Czech Academy of Sciences

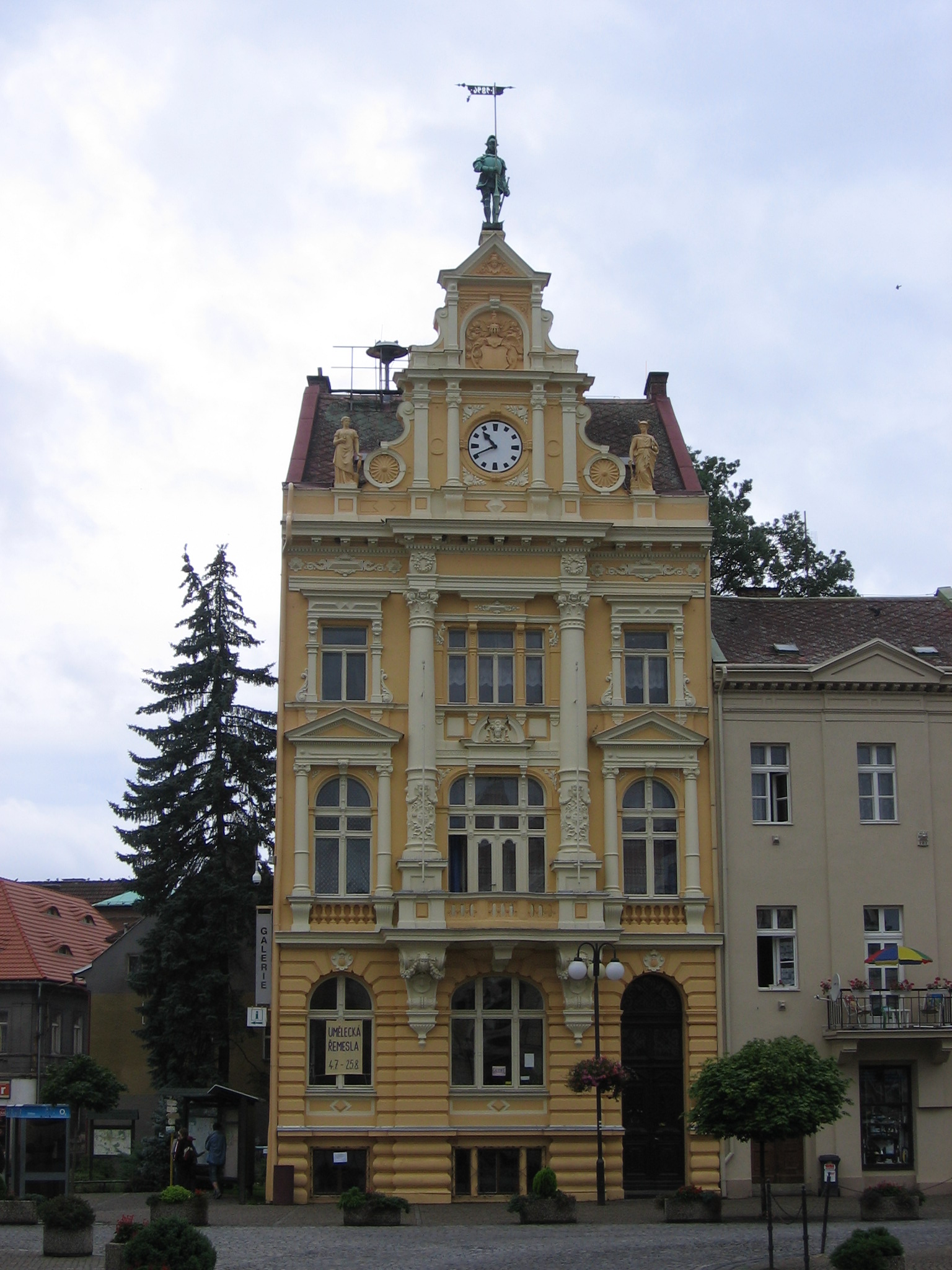
Savings bank building in Česká Kamenice

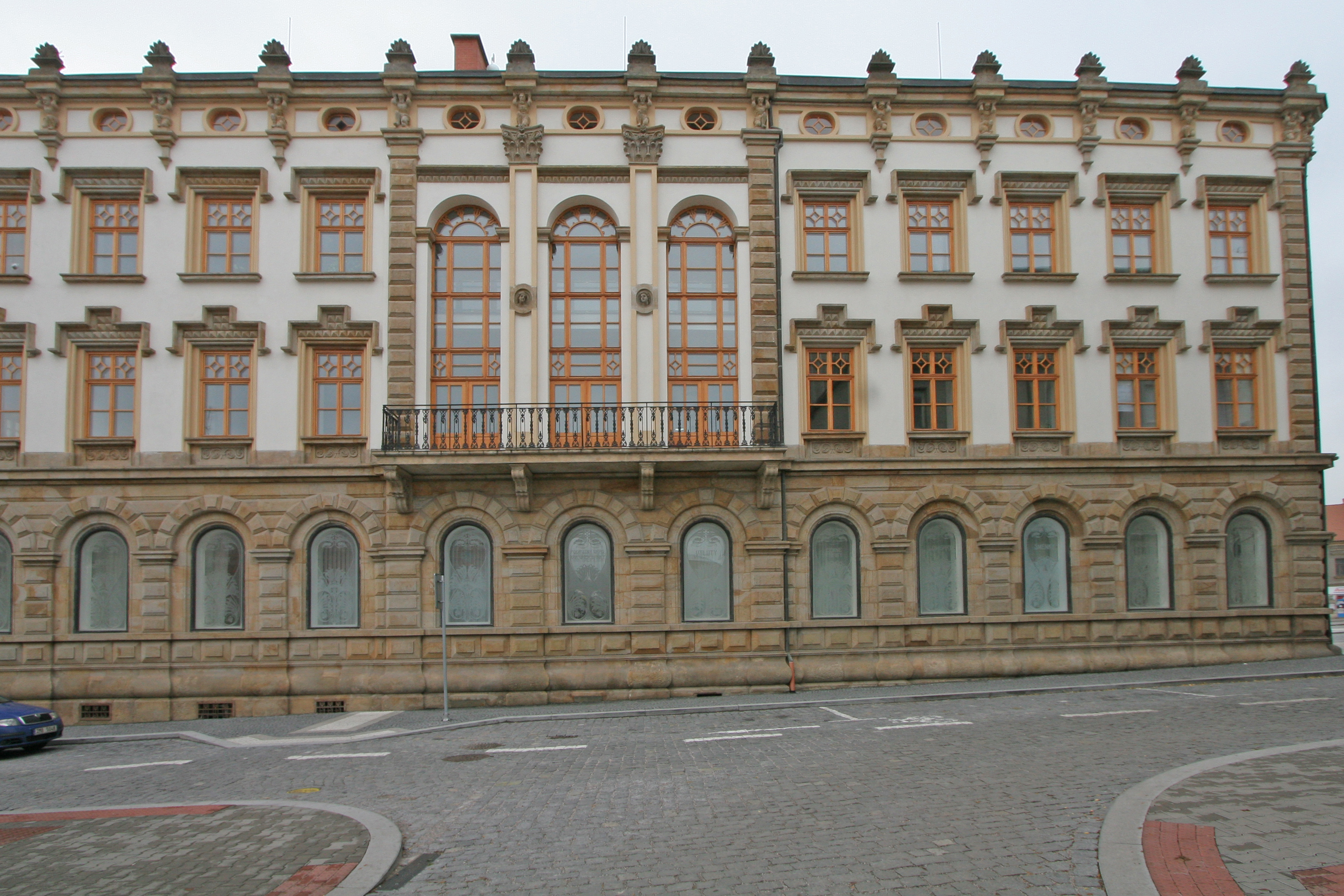
Savings bank building in Hořice

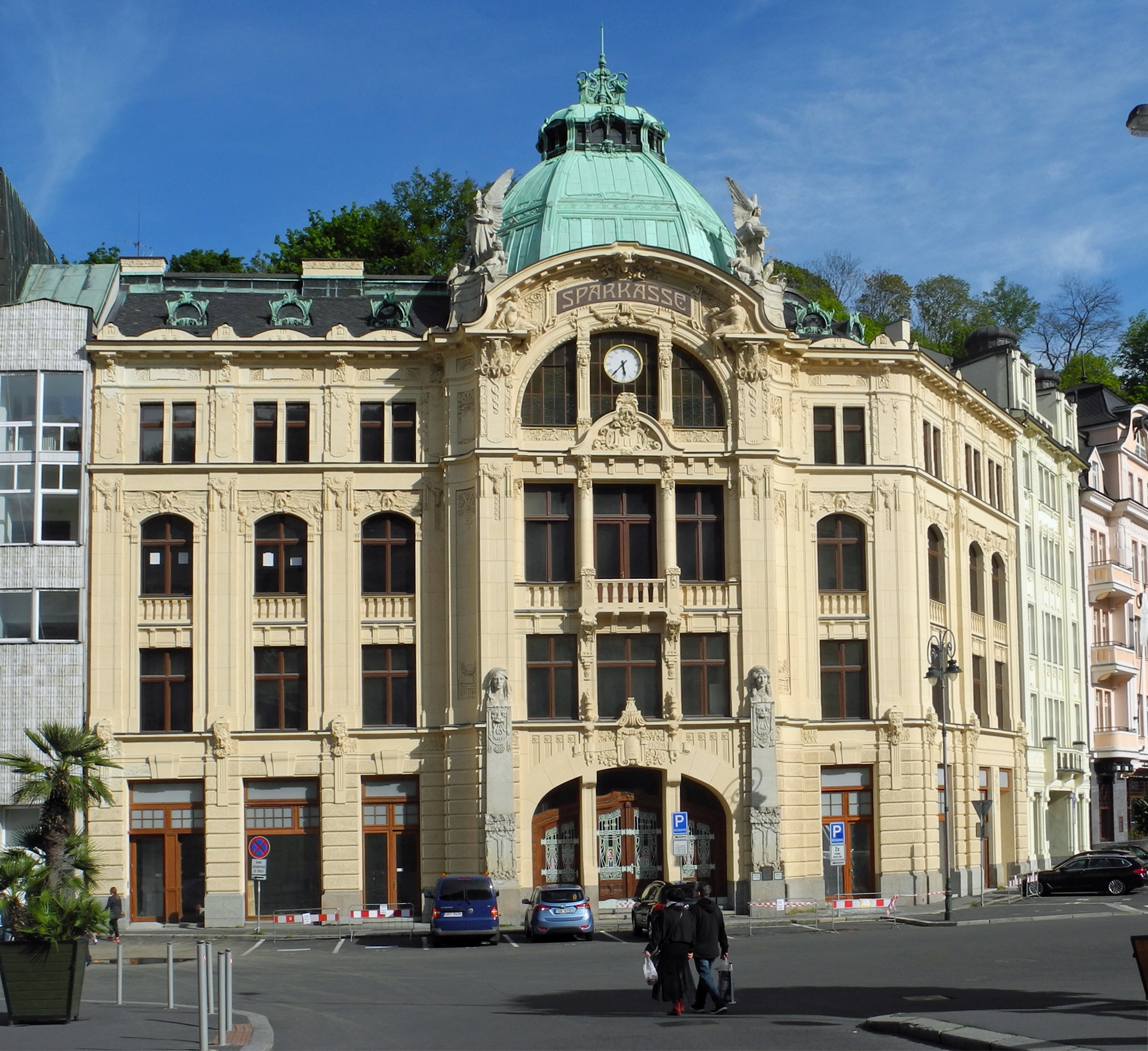
Savings bank building in Karlovy Vary

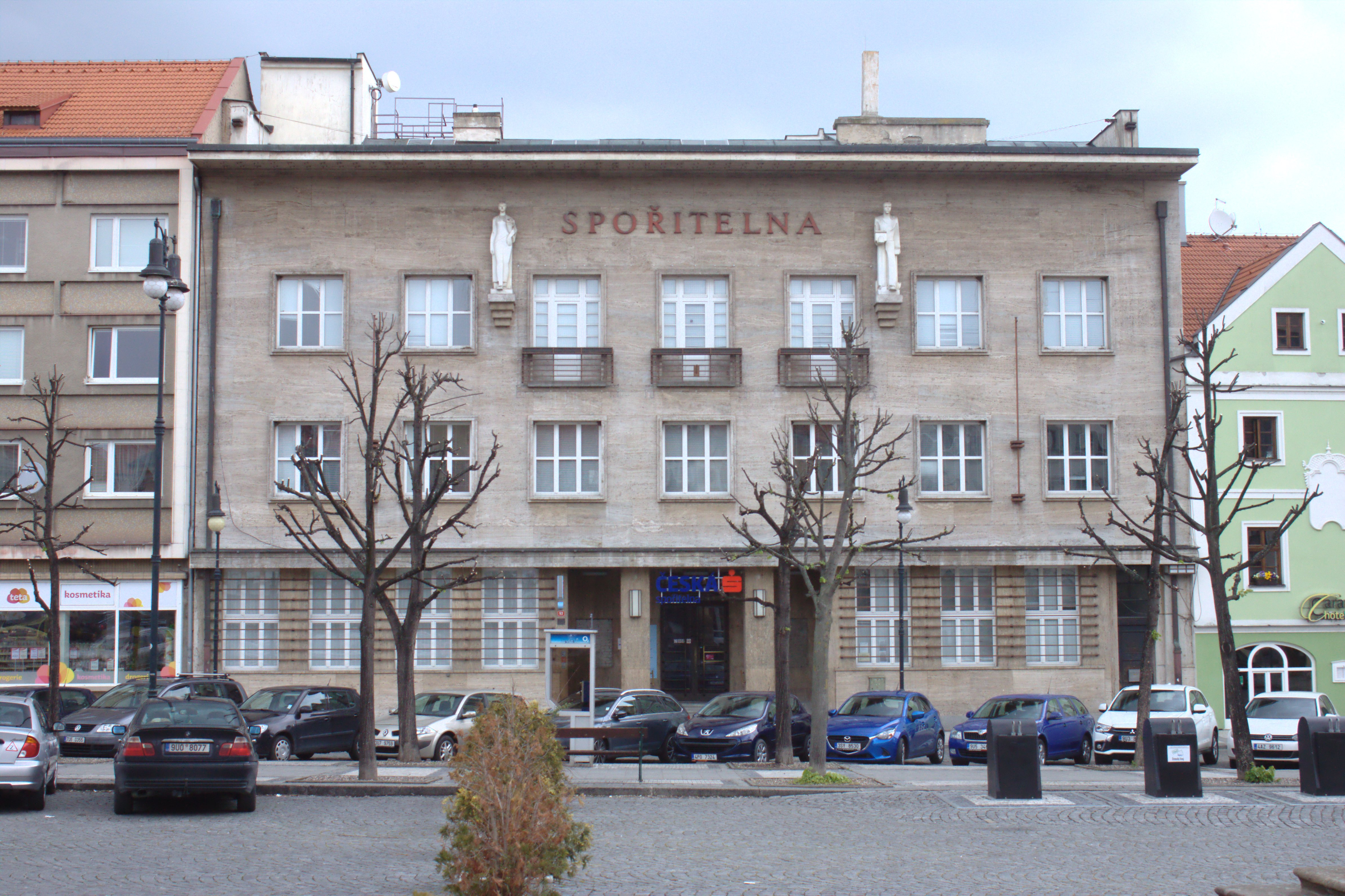
Savings bank building in Louny

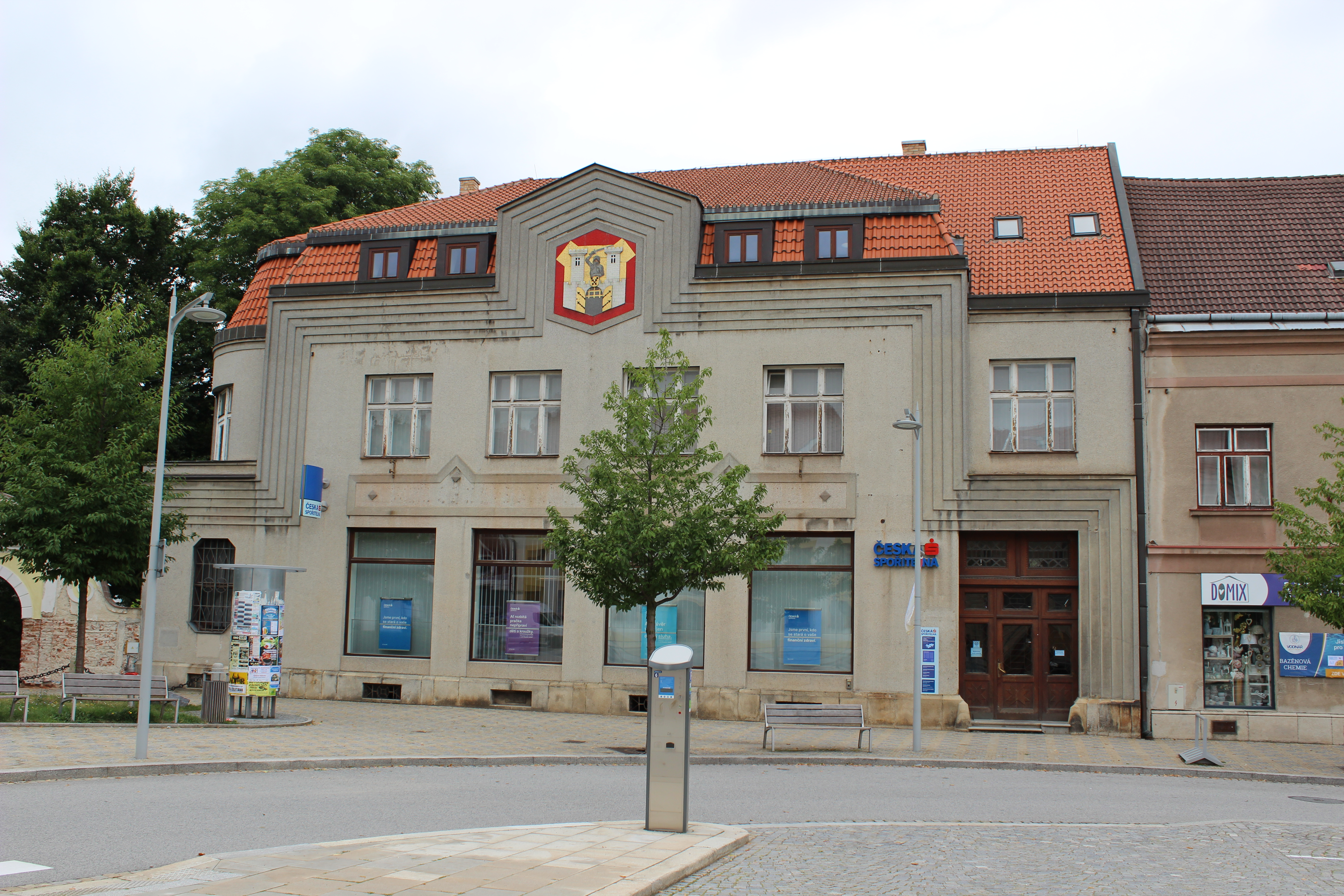
Savings bank building in Moravské Budějovice

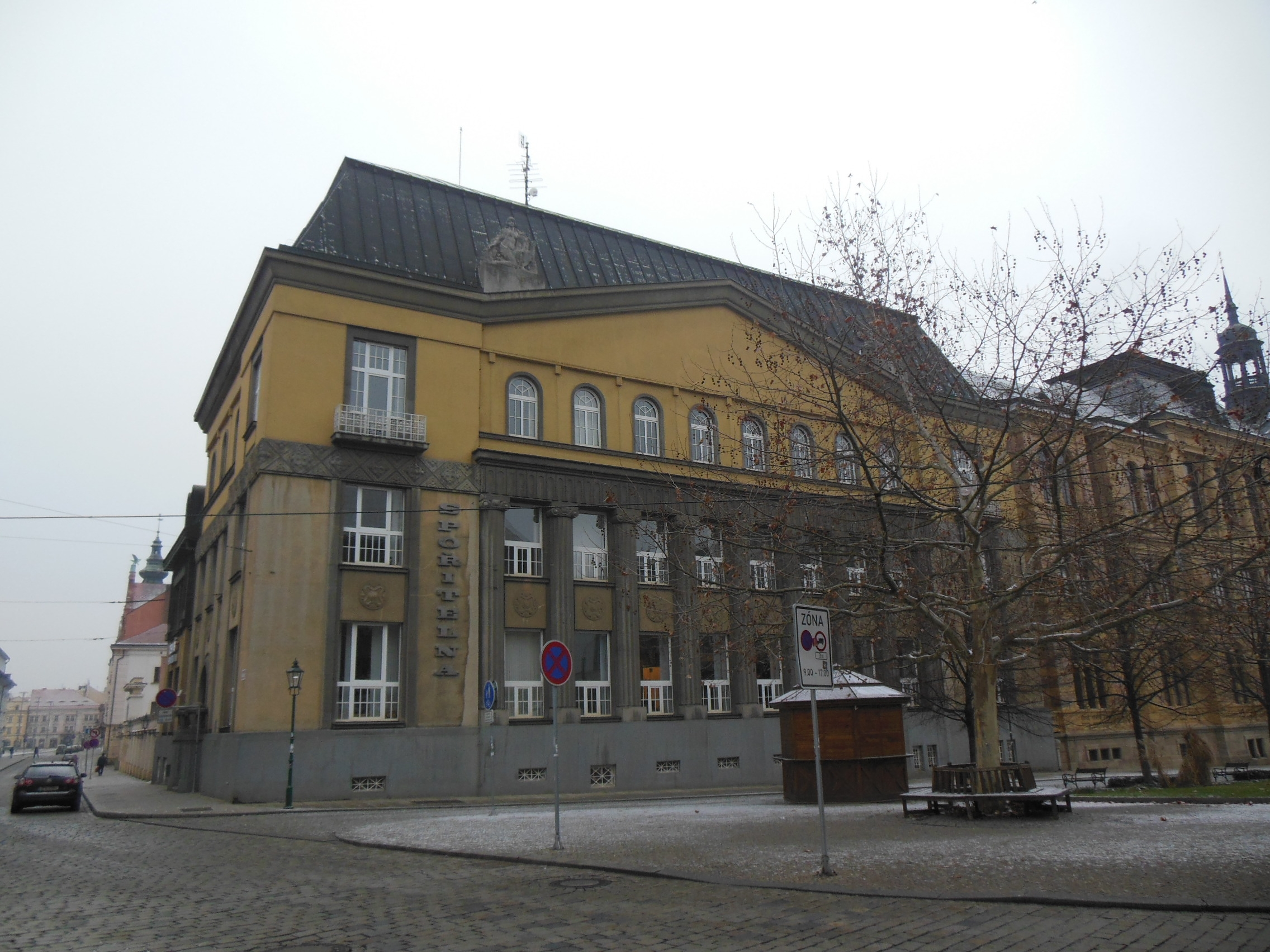
Savings bank building in Plzeň

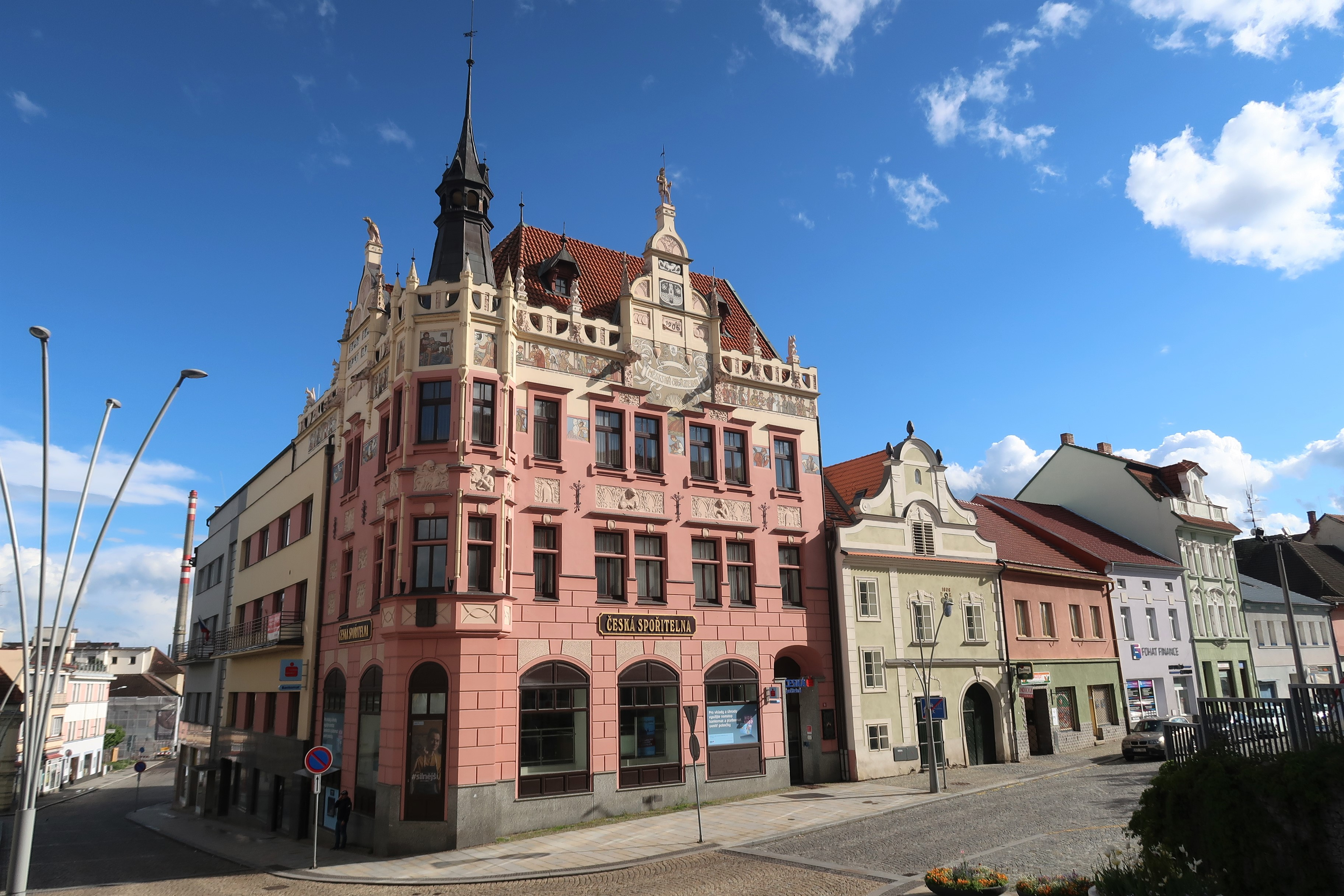
Savings bank building in Strakonice

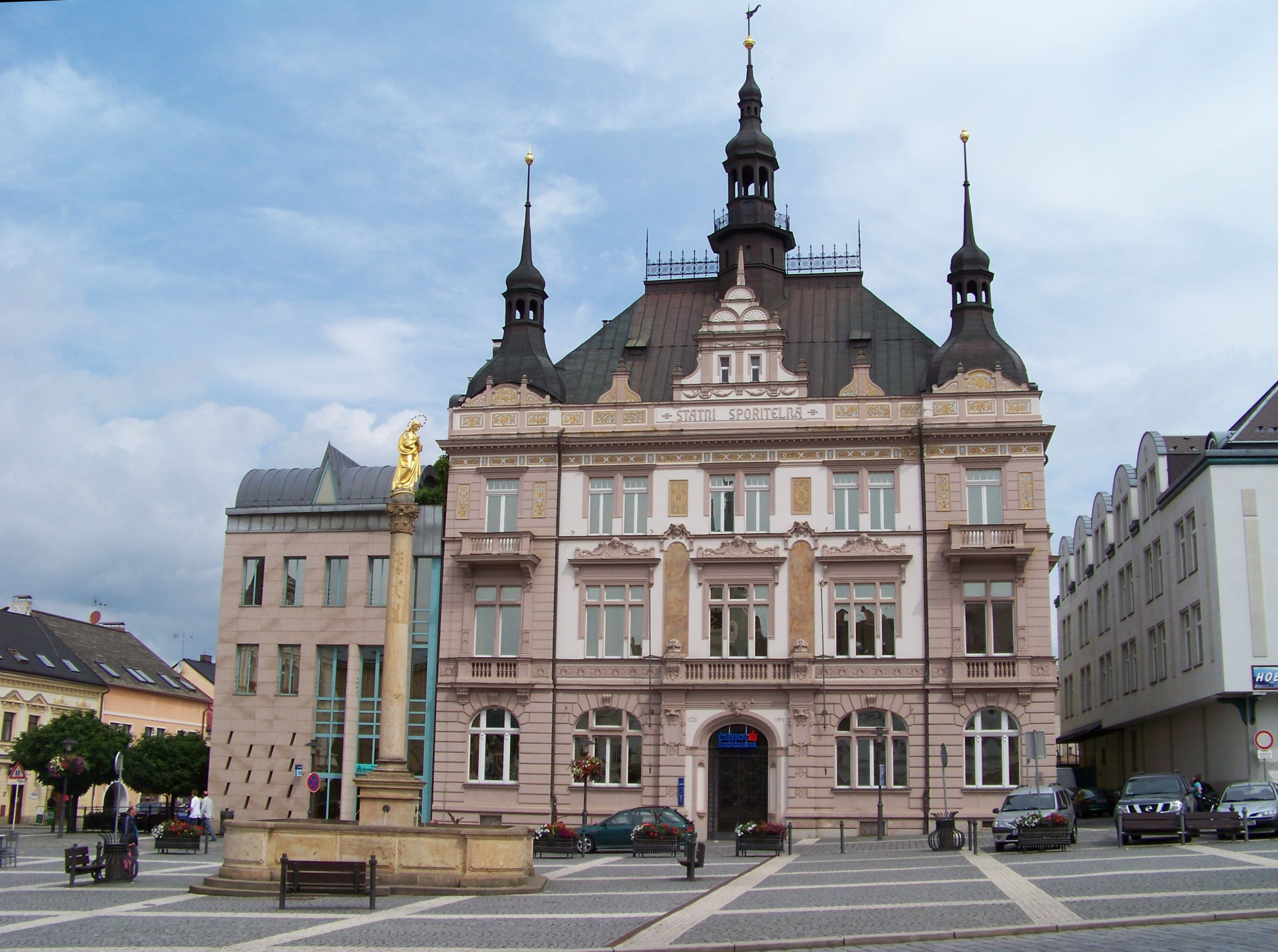
Savings bank building in Turnov

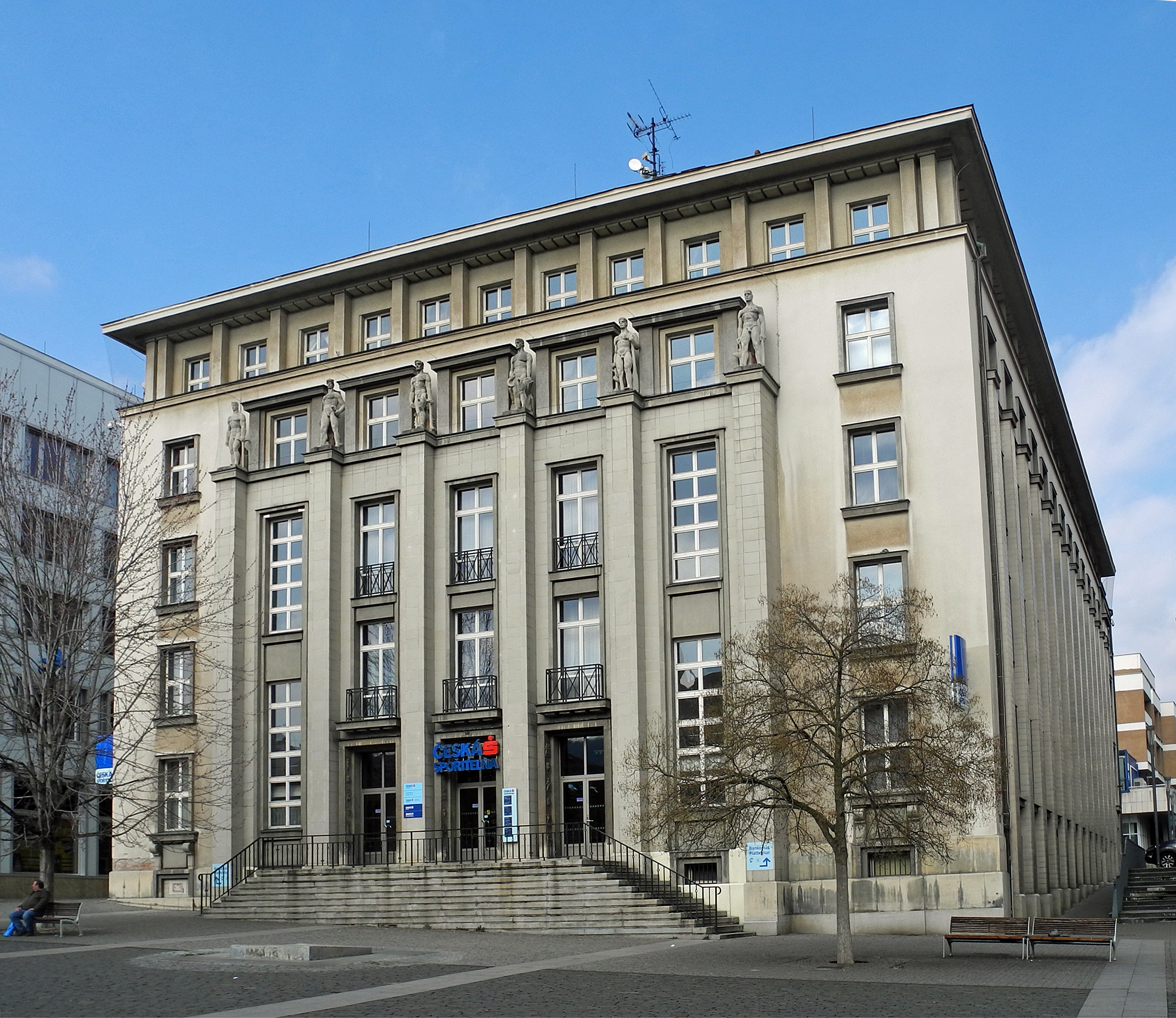
Savings bank building in Ústí nad Labem

=== Habsburg monarchy ===
The origins of Česká spořitelna go back to the emergence of savings banks as a specific form of financial institutions in Europe, starting in Germany in the late 18th century. The first such institution in the Austrian Empire was the Erste österreichische Spar-Casse in Vienna, founded in 1819, which was soon emulated in other cities of the Habsburg Monarchy. Thus, in Prague, the Böhmische Sparkasse (Czech: Česká spořitelna) was established in 1825 after local government official Josef von Hoch first submitted a proposal for its creation in 1823. The institution's full name was Savings Bank (Cashier) for the Capital City of Prague and Bohemia (Czech: Schraňovacá pokladnica (pokladní kasa) pro hlavní město Prahu a pro Čechy). However, the name Böhmische Sparkasse / Česká spořitelna gradually caught on.

The general minimum fund was set at 12,000 florins. The first to respond to the proposal was Prince Rudolf Colloredo, who invested 300 florins in the fund of the future bank. This sum was followed by 23 Czech nobles and other industrialists and entrepreneurs. The first group of contributors, with a contribution of 300 florins, were the nobles Franz Josef of Vrtba, August Lobkowicz, Johann Adolf II of Schwarzenberg, Philip Kinsky, Joseph Wratislaw of Mitrovice, and Prague Archbishop Vaclav Leopold Chlumčanský. As with most other savings banks of those times, the purpose of the first Czech bank (Czech: Česká spořitelna) was to assist the poor sectors of the population. People had to keep certain amounts from which they received a small interest, and thus created stock in case of illness, old age or unemployment. As for deposits, it was possible to store money amounting to between 25 kreuzers to 100 florins. People received registered savings books. Percentages accounted for 4%, later 3%. The bank carried out only a few active operations (mortgage lending, operations with Austrian government securities and partial cash bills before the date of payment) so that people's savings would be secured. The new bank was at first open for only a few days a week (on Monday, Wednesday and Saturday) from 9:00 to 12:00, and from 15:00 to 18:00, and with two rooms in the building of the Bohemian Diet.

The capital of the bank increased gradually. In 1825, it was ƒ124,000; by 1830, it was ƒ1,573,000, and within ten years, ƒ8,087,000. In 1845 the bank moved to its own office on Malostranské náměstí, at which time it was already open throughout the week. In 1861, it completed a prestigious new head office designed by architect Vojtěch Ignác Ullmann, Prague's first building specifically erected for a banking institution. That building was later expanded in the 1890s on plans by Austrian architect Friedrich Schachner.

On September 26, 1844, new Austrian legislation provided a more consistent basis that led to the flourishing of new savings banks in Austria and the rest of the Empire, including the Czech lands. The first one to open outside of Prague was the savings bank in Aš (1847), with about 20 more in the next decade. These banks were German-speaking, until the first Czech-speaking savings bank opened in Plzeň in 1857, thus sometimes referred to as the first genuine Czech savings bank. In the first half of 1860, more Czech-speaking banks opened all over Bohemia, so that the Czech-speaking banks almost equalled the German-speaking ones in number. Initially, the founders of banks were charitable foundations, but gradually, local governments became the dominant founders of savings banks. The conditions for accepting clients also changed. Banks were originally intended for the poor, but after a while their clients were mostly middle-class urban dwellers, which was reflected in the economic strength of the new banks.

At the beginning of the 20th century, umbrella bodies were established for the savings banks network in the Czech Lands: in June 1901, the Association of Czech Savings Banks in Bohemia, Moravia and Silesia was established (Czech: Svaz českých spořitelen v Čechách, na Moravě a ve Slezsku), and in March 1903 the Union of German Savings Banks in Bohemia (German: Verband deutscher Sparkassen in Böhmen), later followed by similar bodies of German savings banks for Moravia and Silesia as well as the Association of German Savings Banks in Austria (German: Reichsverband deutscher Sparkassen in Österreich). At this time, financial institutions were also established to serve the wholesale needs of savings banks: in 1901, the Central Bank of German Savings Banks in Prague (German: Centralbank der deutschen Sparkassen in Prag) and in 1903 the Central Bank of Czech Savings Banks (Czech: Ústřední banka českých spořitelen). The latter two central institutions took over part of the funds managed by the savings banks, so that the funds of many local savings banks could now be involved in new forms of credit business.

A significant increase in deposits also occurred shortly before World War I, during another economic boom. Savings banks thus participated in the rapid economic rise of the country. At the same time, commercial banks expanded their networks of branches, which meant increasing competition for local savings banks. Savings banks also established branches outside their cities of residence. The main one, the Böhmische Sparkasse, thus had over 70 branches just before the World War. At that time, Czech savings banks had five times more deposits than Czech commercial banks, and for the German banks the ratio was ten to one. The Czech Lands had the most developed savings banks network of all of Cisleithania.

In 1909, depositors began to panic upon reports of the beginning of a war with Serbia. Another alarm was in 1912, in connection with the start of the Balkan Wars. The outbreak of the First World War caused a huge panic among the population, and people tried to withdraw their deposits, so on July 31, 1914, the government announced a moratorium on all large payments, which continued until the summer of 1915. Even so, the savings banks lost most of their cash in the first year of the war. Gradually, however, their situation improved thanks to the rural savings banks, which increased capital due to investments in rural enterprises during food shortages. As deposits in rural banks grew, the central balance improved; the surplus was then invested in military loans.

=== Interwar Czechoslovakia ===
The independent Czechoslovak Republic, which was established in October 1918, inherited a double type of institutions called savings banks: in the Czech lands they were institutions established on the basis of regulations from 1844, while in Slovakia, which had been governed by Hungarian legislation, there were only profit-seeking joint-stock banks, even those that carried the name "savings bank". New legislation came about in 1920 with the new Savings Act No. 302 (entered into force on May 6), which introduced the same principles of existence and business for all savings banks. Although the possibility was offered of canceling various restrictions that made it difficult for savings banks to compete with other financial institutions, in the end the point of view prevailed that it was these restrictions that gave savings banks a reputation for solidity and stability, and therefore such changes did not take place. In terms of organization, the law continued to allow only the existence of savings banks guaranteed by territorial self-governing units (districts or municipalities), thereby canceling the possibility of the creation of other "federal" savings banks. However, for historical reasons, two federal institutions were left in operation: Spořitelna česká / Böhmische Sparkasse in Prague, and the First Moravian Savings Bank (Czech: První moravská spořitelna) in Brno.

In the first months after the establishment of the state, there was uncertainty and stagnation. In addition, German savings banks were burdened with a large number of war loans. However, the situation gradually stabilized and savings bank deposits doubled in the five post-war years. On July 27, 1920, Government Regulation No. 77 established the Association of Czechoslovak Savings Banks (Czech: Svaz československých spořitelen) as an organizational and control body. Membership in it was mandatory for all savings banks in the new country. The central financial institutions remained the Ústřední banka české spořitelen for Czech savings banks, and that for the German institutions had its name altered to Centralbank der deutschen Sparkassen in der Čechoslovakischen Republik.

Savings banks developed dynamically in the boom years 1924–1929. The balance sheet deposits of savings banks grew even during the economic turmoil and stagnation that followed the European banking crisis of 1931, while commercial banks found themselves in a difficult situation. It once again turned out that in times of economic uncertainty, depositors turned to financial institutions guaranteed by the public authorities. As an illustration, in 1919, commercial banks accounted for 57 percent of the total balance sheet of all financial institutions, while savings banks accounted for only 20 percent. In 1937, by contrast, banks accounted for 31 percent, and savings banks for 28 percent.

=== Nazi era and aftermath ===
In the fall of 1938, the Sudetenland were annexed by Nazi Germany, and in the spring of 1939, the rest of the republic was dismantled and occupied. In the field of credit institutions, there was a forced concentration and the establishment of new corporate units. This corporatist concept was imported from the German Reich. In 1941, government regulation No. 141 and the subsequent decree of the Ministry of Finance No. 429 imposed a unified organization of monetary affairs in the protectorate. The Ústřední svaz peněžnictví pro Čechy a Moravu was established as the supreme body, which was divided into three economic groups. The second group, called Financial Institutions with Public Tasks, brought together savings banks and economic district credit unions, and the third group was for cooperative banks. Membership in the central body was mandatory. Thanks to this, the protectorate authorities controlled the activities of all financial institutions.

Efforts towards concentration continued in the following years as well, which manifested themselves in the reduction of the network of financial institutions and their Germanization. As part of this effort, the Municipal Savings Bank of Prague was also merged with the Municipal Savings Bank in Královské Vinohrady (1941), and in 1943 that merged institution in turn was absorbed into the Böhmische Sparkasse. District savings banks in Smíchov, Karlín, Hostivař and Zbraslav were also brought into the new institution, and the entire newly established institution was called Prague Savings Bank (German: Prager Sparkasse, Czech: Spořitelna pražská).

After the end of the war in 1945, the restoration and creation of a network of savings banks began, especially in the border areas, where the previous German institutions were liquidated. On 21 July 1945, the Czechoslovak Savings Council was also established, which was supposed to bring together Czech and Slovak savings banks. However, the activity of this advisory body did not have time to fully develop. The government of Klement Gottwald, with J. Dolanský as minister of finance, made further attempts to reorganize the monetary system after 1946. However, the communists had no influence either in the Union of Czechoslovak Savings Banks or in the Credit Union, and the reform did not take place until 1948.

=== Communist era ===
After February 1948, nothing stood in the way of centralization and nationalization. On July 20, 1948, the National Assembly passed Law No. 181, which mandated the merger of all financial institutions operating in the same locality regardless of their nature. Thus, from August 1948, the following forms of financial institutions existed in Czechoslovakia:

- in the cities that were the seat of a district: district savings and credit unions (Czech: okresní spořitelny a záložny, OSAZ);
- in other cities: savings and credit unions (Czech: spořitelny a záložny, SAZ);
- in villages: credit unions (Czech: záložny – kampeličky, ZK).

In 1949, there were 258 OSAZs, 447 SAZs, 3924 ZKs, and 255 OSAZ branches in the country. Nationalization changed the previous function of savings banks, namely providing loans: their main task now became the acquisition and concentration of deposits and their use for the needs of the centrally planned economy. Only about 10-15% could be used to provide loans to individuals.

Even so, the situation that arose in the financial sector after 1948 was rather confusing. Management competences were not clarified, and the system was a kind of hybrid between public and cooperative institutions. In 1952, therefore, Act No. 84/1952 Coll. was adopted, which established a network of state savings banks on 1 January 1953, which were transformed into district savings banks and credit unions (OSAZ), while savings banks and credit unions (SAZ) and credit unions (ZK) in the area of the district became their branches and offices. This definitively converted all these institutions into state entities. The supreme authority was the so-called main administration of all savings banks (Czech: hlavní správa všech spořitelen), which was established at the Ministry of Finance in Prague. It was then subordinated to the special regional administration in Bratislava with jurisdiction only for Slovakia, as well as the regional administrations of state savings banks in individual regions.

Further adjustments to the system took place in 1967. The growth agenda and the effort to subordinate the activities of savings banks to a unified system led to the adoption of Act No. 72 in 1967. This merged all state savings banks into a single financial institution with economic and legal personality, the State Savings Bank (Czech: Státná spořitelna). The main, special regional and regional administrations were abolished and regional branches were established in their place. Another change was brought by the year 1968: a federal organization of the state took place, and as part of this process, the State Savings Bank was also established by Act No. 163/1968 Coll. of 19.12. 1968 with effect from 1.1. 1969 split into Czech State Savings Bank (Czech: Česká státní spořitelna, ČSTSP) and Slovak State Savings Bank (Slovak: Slovenská štátna sporiteľňa).

During the communist period, the commercial or deposit activities of savings banks were limited, but they nevertheless developed. After the currency reform in 1953, when deposits began to flow again, savings banks were primarily supposed to campaign in favor of depositing funds and increasing confidence in the currency. The most common form of savings was depositing in deposit books (Czech: vkladní knížka, VK) without a notice period (2% interest). This originally most widespread form of savings was gradually displaced in favor of VKs with a six-month notice period (interest at 3%) and especially VKs with an annual notice period at 4% interest, which accounted for more than half of all deposits in 1989. Other options included winning VK or travel VK. In 1969, premium savings for young people were introduced, and from 1972, so-called sporogiro (Czech: sporožiro) accounts, which allowed non-cash transfer of deposits. There was also the possibility of loans, especially so-called supplementary loans for the purchase of selected types of durable goods, credit assistance for individual or cooperative construction and, from 1973, loans for young marriages (so-called newlywed loans): in that case, the ČSTSP helped implement the government's population policy objectives, because with each additional child born, the loan became more advantageous for the couple.

=== Postcommunist transition and 21st century ===
At the end of the 1980s, under the influence of changes brought about by the Russian perestroika, a new law on the State Bank of Czechoslovakia was approved on 15 November 1989. This law converted the central bank's previous remit into several entities: the continued State Bank; Investiční banka for long-term lending; and two new commercial banking institutions, namely Komerční banka in Prague and Všeobecná úverová banka in Bratislava. In mid-December 1989 - that is, already at the time of changing political conditions - this law was followed up by Act No. 158, according to which all existing financial institutions were granted the status of universal commercial banks from 1 January 1990.

On February 1, 1992, Česká státní spořitelna changed its legal form to a joint-stock company with the new name Česká spořitelna, a.s. However, the State retained the decisive block of shares, namely 40%. Another 20% was obtained by a free transfer to the cities and municipalities of the Czech Republic, and 3% formed a reserve for possible restitution. 37% of the shares were then privatized as part of the 1st wave of coupon privatization.

In 2000, Erste Group bought a 52 percent stake in Česká spořitelna from the Czech Government for 19 billion Czech crowns (€530 million), becoming the majority shareholder in the bank, increasing their stake in subsequent years to 98%.

In December 2016, Česká spořitelna joined the Think Tank.

== Operations ==
As of 2023, Česká spořitelna had approximately 5 million customers and was the largest bank in the Czech market. It provides services to individuals, as well as small and medium enterprises. The bank finances large corporations and provides services in the financial markets. It has issued 3.3 million debit and credit cards, and it also has the largest ATM network in the Czech Republic (about 1244). Almost 1.2 million customers use the bank's direct banking services. The network of branches includes more than 640 locations, including mortgage, commercial and development centers. The Česká spořitelna Foundation supports charitable projects in the fields of culture, education, science, public and social issues, healthcare, charitable, municipal events, sports and ecology. The bank employs almost 11,000 employees in all regions of the Czech Republic.

Its main clients are:

- individuals
- small and medium enterprises
- cities and municipalities
- large corporations

Its main products include:

- loans
- financial market consultancy
- payment cards
- ATMs
- online banking
- retail services, mortgage, development centers, etc.

== Financial data ==
Financial data for period 2000–2009, billions Kč
Year	2000	2001	2002	2003	2004	2005	2006	2007	2008	2009
Net profit	0.04	1.8	5.8	7.6	8.1	9.1	10.4	12.1	15.8	12.6
Operating profit	5.6	7	8.8	10.2	11.3	12.4	15.2	18.4	23.2	26.4
Clients, mln	n/a	n/a	5.4	5.52	5.35	5.33	5.28	5.29	5.29	5.27

Financial data for period 2010–2019, billions Kč
Year	2010	2011	2012	2013	2014	2015	2016	2017	2018	2019
Net profit	12.1	13.6	16.6	15.6	15.1	14.3	15.5	14.6	15.4	17.7
Operating profit	26.7	25.6	26.3	22.9	22.9	21.2	20.1	19	20.8	22.5
Clients, mln	5.27	5.2	5.3	5.26	4.92	4.79	4.71	4.67	4.63	4.59

Financial data for period since 2020, billions Kč
Year	2020	2021	2022	2023	2024
Net profit	10.0	14.2	20.2	18.6	26.2
Operating profit	21.0	22.0	28.5	25.2	32.2
Clients, mln	4.47	4.49	4.54	4.54	4.63

== See also ==
- List of banks in the Czech Republic
