= Juchelka =

Juchelka (feminine: Juchelková) is a Czech surname. Notable people with the surname include:

- Aleš Juchelka (born 1976), Czech politician and writer
- Jan Juchelka (born 1971), Czech banker
