= Jan Barta =

Jan Barta or Bárta may refer to:

- Jan Bárta, Czech professional road cyclist
- Jan Bárta (architect), Czech architect
