= Tomáš Salomon =

Czech banker, investor (born 1966)

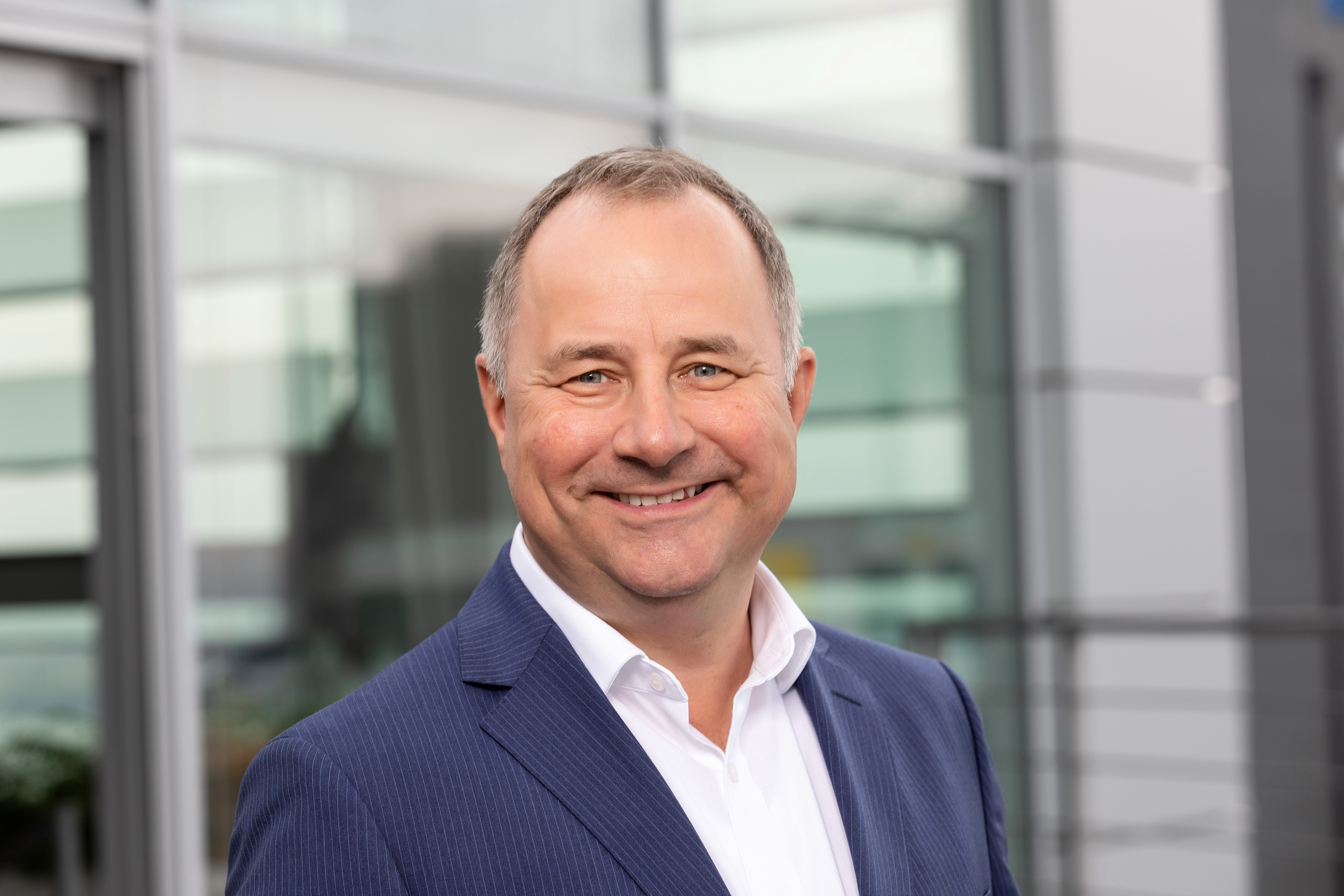
- Born: 1 March 1966 (age 60); Ostrava, Czech Republic
- Education: University of Economics in Bratislava
- Occupation: Banker
- Known for: CEO of Česká spořitelna

Tomáš Salomon is a Czech banker and investor who is currently the CEO of Česká spořitelna as well as the vice president of the Czech Banking Association.

== Early life and education ==
Tomáš Salomon was born on 1 March 1966 in Ostrava and graduated from the Faculty of Services and Tourism Economics at the University of Economics in Bratislava.

== Career ==
Salomon started his banking career in 1997 at GE Capital Multiservis, where he held the roles of chairman of the board of directors and CEO. By 2000, he took on the position of Director of Retail Banking and became a member of the board of directors at GE Capital Bank, overseeing sales and marketing. From 2004 to 2007, he then assumed the role of chairman of the board of directors at Poštová banka in Slovakia. Between 2008 and 2012, Salomons focus shifted towards private investment projects, and he instigated a project to establish a mobile payments platform in the Czech Republic called Mobito. The platform was operated by Mopet CZ, where he served as CEO. Mobito was not a success however, so in 2013 he joined Slovenská sporitelña as a board member, becoming Director for Retail later on. Since January 2015, Salomon has been a board member at Ceská spořitelna, subsequently replacing Pavel Kysilka as CEO in January 2016.

On 16 June 2023, after being president for three years, Salomon became first vice-president of the Czech Banking Association. He was succeeded by the previous first vice-president, Jan Juchelka. He also is a member of the Scientific Board at the Prague University of Economics and Business.
