= Jan Bárta (architect) =

Czech architect and preservationist

Jan Bárta (born 9 August 1942 in Prague) is a Czech architect and preservationist. He has written several books about historic preservation and is a specialist in the area of facades and plaster on historic buildings. He is also known as an advocate for restoration of the monument of Josef Radetzky in Prague, which was removed in 1921.

In 1991 Jan Bárta together with chemist Jiří Rathouský founded a company to produce facade colours, hydrophobic coats and other chemicals aimed for restoration of historic houses. It has been the exclusive supplier of facade colours for the historic buildings of Prague Castle and various other historic monuments of the Czech Republic and elsewhere.

In 2011 Jan Bárta founded Spolek Radecký Praha (Radetzky Association Prague), which aims to commemorate Field Marshal Radetzky and for several years has been advocating for the restoration of Radetzky's monument on Malostranské náměstí in Prague. This endeavour has been supported by numerous historians. Bárta stresses that Radetzky was a great Czech historical personality from an old Bohemian noble family and the monument was a beautiful work of art. In an interview for Czech online newspaper iDNES.cz, Bárta stated that the nationalist concept of Czech history in the 20th caused many great persons (such as Radetzky) to be almost forgotten, so his aim is to correct that. In 2016 the association held great celebrations of 250 years since Radetzky's birth in his birthplace Sedlčany (under the patronage of the municipal government) and in Prague. In Sedlčany a commemorative plaque was unveiled.

Since 2013, he is the vice-charman of the Club for old Prague – an important preservationist organisation in Prague.

Bárta is a monarchist and member of the Koruna Česká (Czech monarchist party), in the years 2014-2018 he was the party's hejtman (regional chairman) for Bohemia.
