= Komerční banka =

Banking company in the Czech Republic

Komerční banka a.s.
- Company type: Public
- Industry: Banking
- Founded: 1990; 36 years ago
- Headquarters: Prague, Czech Republic
- Key people: Jan Juchelka (CEO)
- Products: Financial services
- Revenue: 36,786,000,000 Czech koruna (2024)
- Operating income: ▲CZK 37.7 billion (2024)
- Net income: ▲CZK 17.4 billion (2024)
- Total assets: ▲CZK 1,536 billion (2024)
- Owner: Société Générale (60%)
- Number of employees: 8,492 (2017)
- Website: www.kb.cz

Komerční banka (“KB”) is a major Czech bank and the parent company of KB Group, a member of the Société Générale international financial group. KB is a universal bank providing a wide range of services in retail, corporate and investment banking complemented by specialised financial services produced by KB’s subsidiaries or other SG Group companies. KB Group operates in the Czech Republic and also provides services to corporate clients in Slovakia. It serves more than 1.6 million customers in 399 branches.

All of the services are accessible through the dense network of KB branches, its own distribution network, and on-line services, such as internet banking.

Service for corporate clients of Komerční banka is provided by two segments, usually according to annual turnover (sales) and number of products used. Companies with turnover from CZK 60 million to 1500 million are generally served by the Corporate sales centers. Clients with a higher turnover are usually served by the Top Corporations divisions, which are located in Prague, Brno and Bratislava.

== History ==
The bank was founded in 1990 following separation of commercial activities from the former State Bank of Czechoslovakia. In 1992, the bank was partially privatized in voucher privatization.

In 2001, the state’s 60% holding in Komerční banka was purchased by Société Générale. Following privatization, KB began significantly to develop its activities for individual customers and entrepreneurs, in addition to building on its traditionally strong position in the enterprises and municipalities market.

In 2014 the Komerční banka signed a partnership with the National Gallery in Prague.

In 2020 Komerční banka acquired 96% of Upvest, which was founded in 2017 and is based in Prague.

In 2021, the bank had 241 branches and operated 857 ATMs.

In January 2021, Komerční banka announced that, in cooperation with Syncordis, it will begin the transition to a new software platform from Temenos, with the aim of achieving the reference level for the digitization of banking services in the Czech Republic. According to Komerční banka's CEO Jan Juchelka, this is a crucial Investment for the bank and is supposed to improve the customer experience. Komerční banka's partnership with Syncordis includes the supply and implementation of the banking software.

In 2022 Komerční banka launched an initiative to make all Czech banks cooperate with each other in using and sharing a single ATM network instead of each bank having its own. This means that only one ATM will be required, which customers of all participating banks can use without additional fees. The network started with only Komerční banka and Moneta Money Bank as part of it, until UniCredit Bank and Air Bank joined them in February 2023.

In March 2025, Komerční banka became the sole shareholder of SG Equipment Finance Czech Republic by acquiring the remaining 49.9% stake.

== Sponsoring ==
Komerční banka has been a partner of institutions, projects and events of society-wide importance for many years. It focuses on culture, non-professional sport and education. Support for Czech culture is the main area of the bank’s sponsorship. Komerční banka has been the general partner of the National Theatre, the most important Czech theatrical institution, for more than ten years. The bank has been supporting the French Film Festival for the same time. Since 2014, it has also been a partner of the National Gallery in Prague.

== Komerční banka Jistota Foundation ==
The Jistota Foundation has been supporting projects in the areas of social and health care services for over 20 years while focusing on senior citizens and children. In 2014, it supported 99 projects, mainly through financial support from the Bank and its associated companies but also thanks to employee initiatives. In addition to their donating money, the employees also constitute the Foundation’s management and supervisory boards. The Foundation’s donations in 2014 exceeded CZK 9 million.

== Awards ==
In 2004, 2005, 2007 and 2022 Komerční banka received the Bank of the Year Award from the Mastercard company. The competition is a review of most of the major Czech banks, which were judged on the comprehensive services, financial incentives and customer service they offer.

The Best Bank of the Year 2017 in the Czech Republic was Komerční banka.

== See also ==
- List of banks in the Czech Republic
