= Malostranské náměstí =

Main square of Malá Strana, Prague, Czech Republic

Coordinates: 50.0881°N 14.4039°E

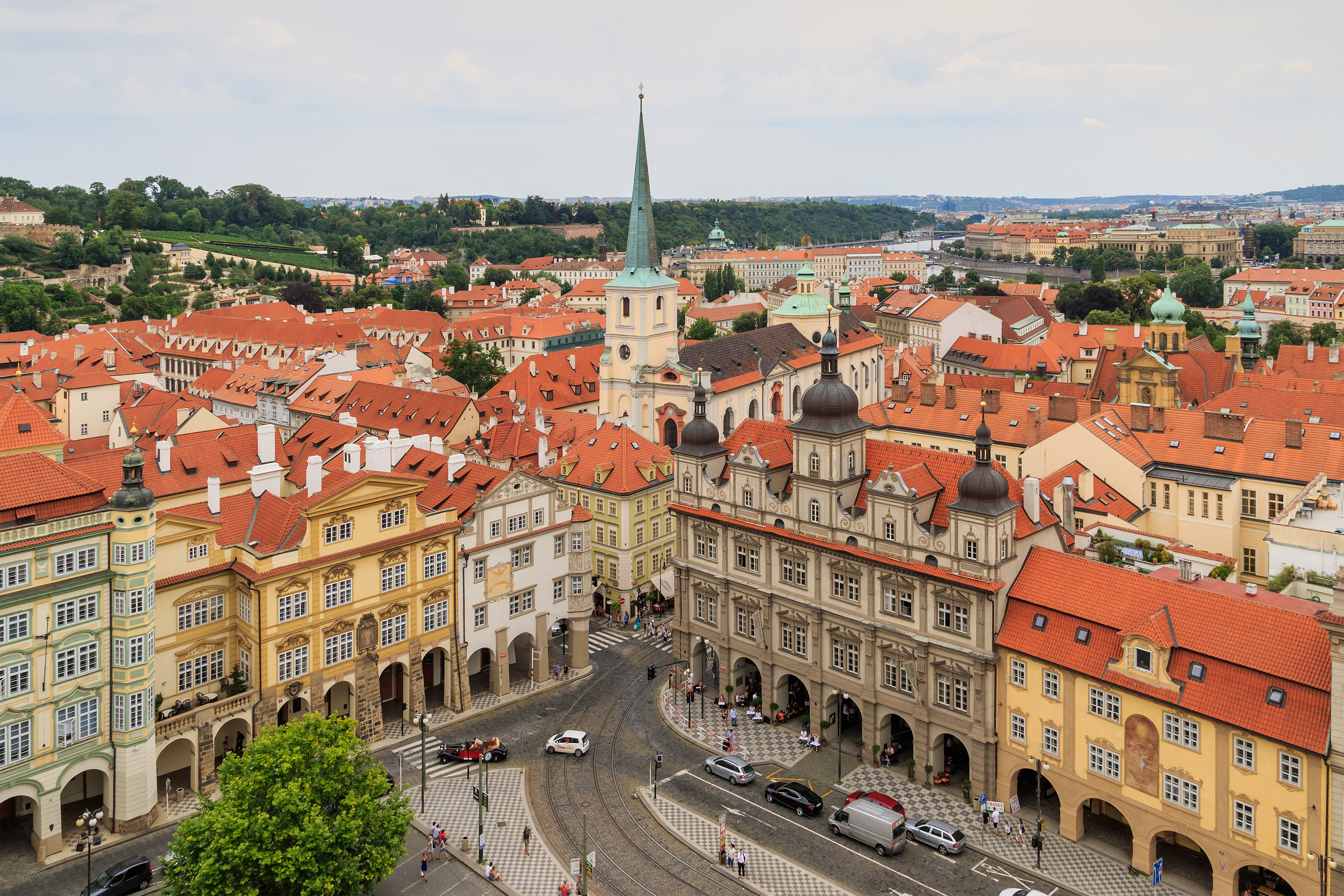
View from the tower of St. Nicholas Church (Malá Strana)

Malostranské náměstí (Lesser Town Square) is the main square of Prague's Malá Strana (Lesser Town) at the foot of Prague Castle.

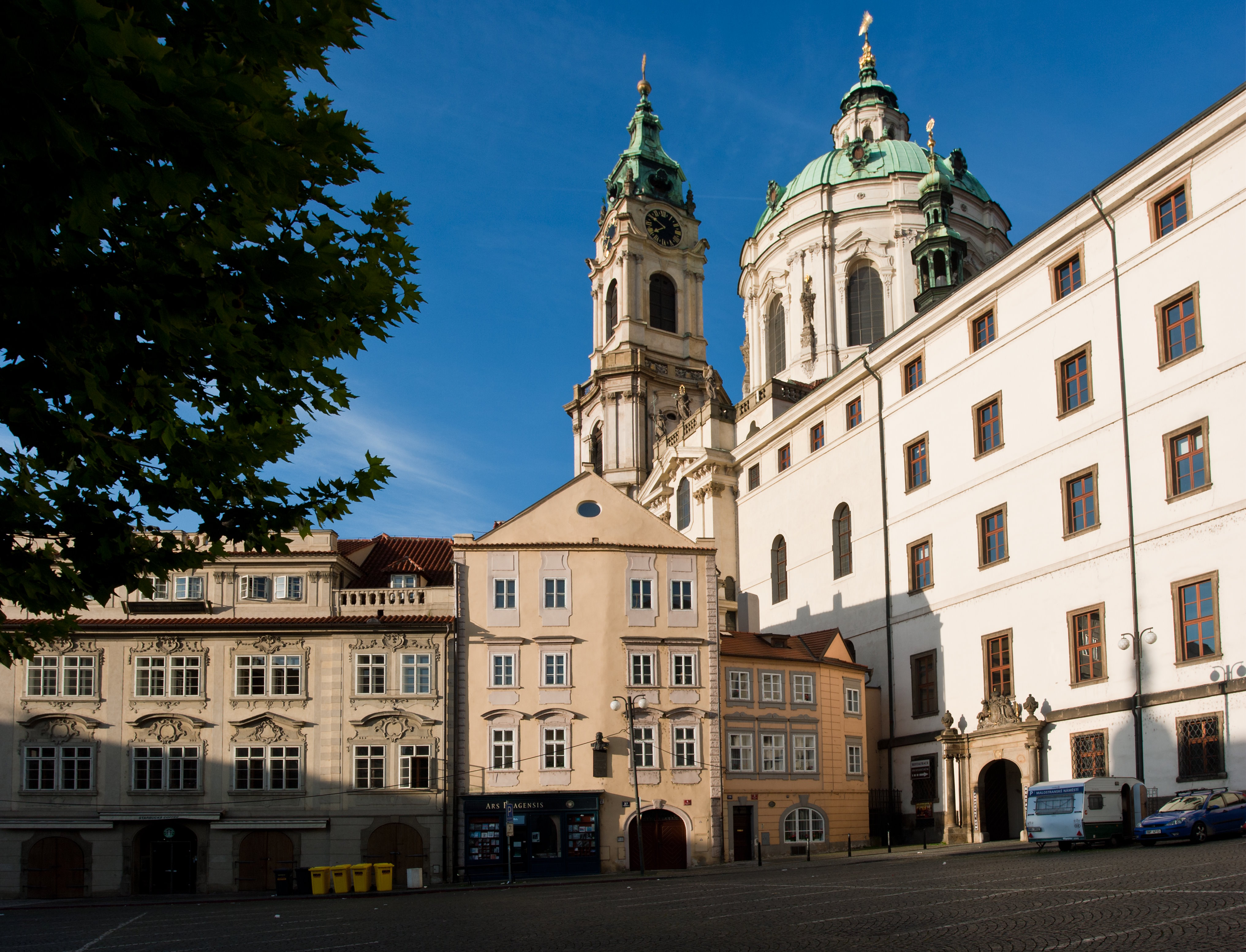
Lower Square, the central area: Jesuit College (now part of the University), tower and dome of St. Nicholas Church.

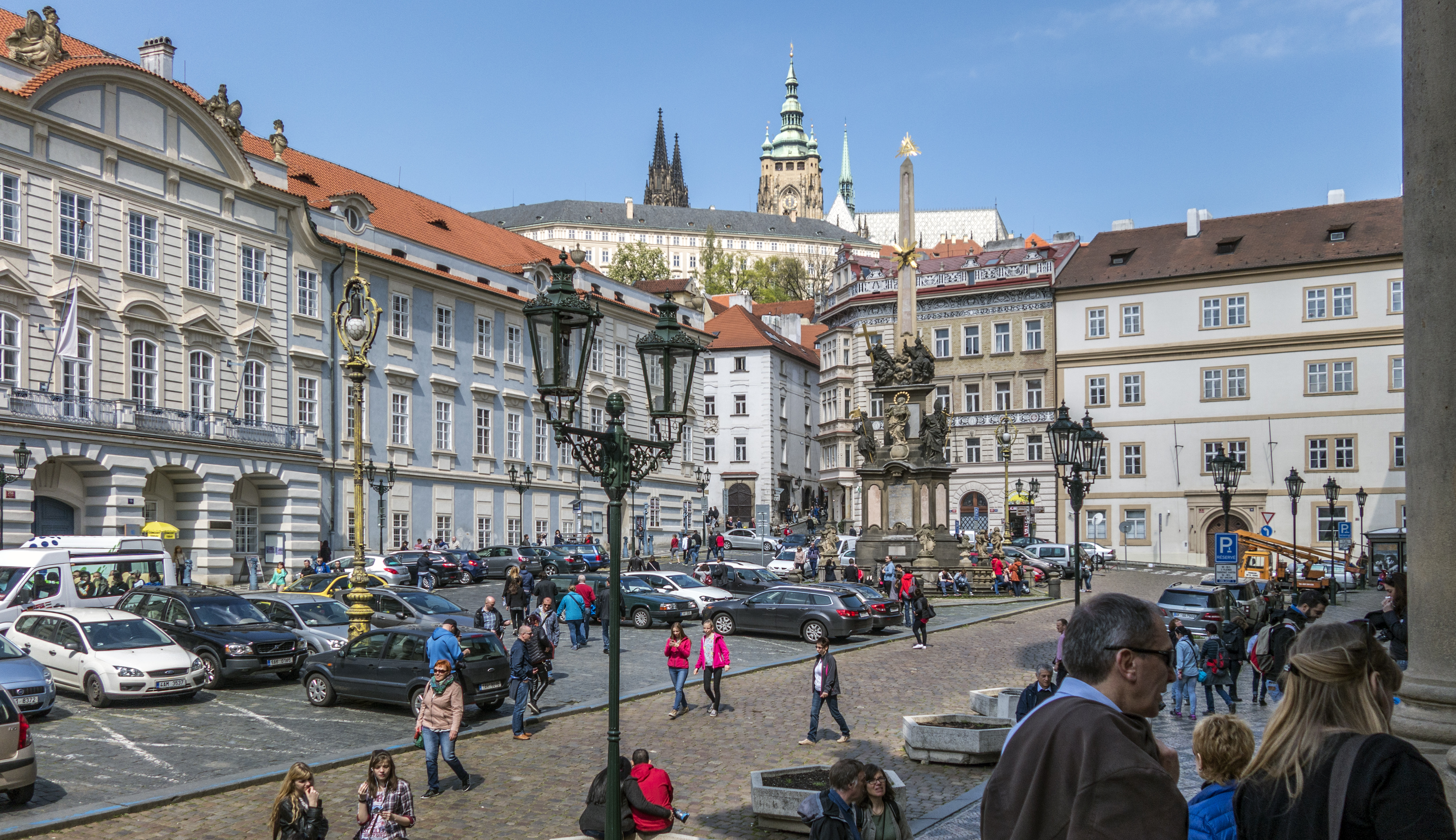
Upper part of the square: Liechtenstein Palace on the left, Prague Castle in the background

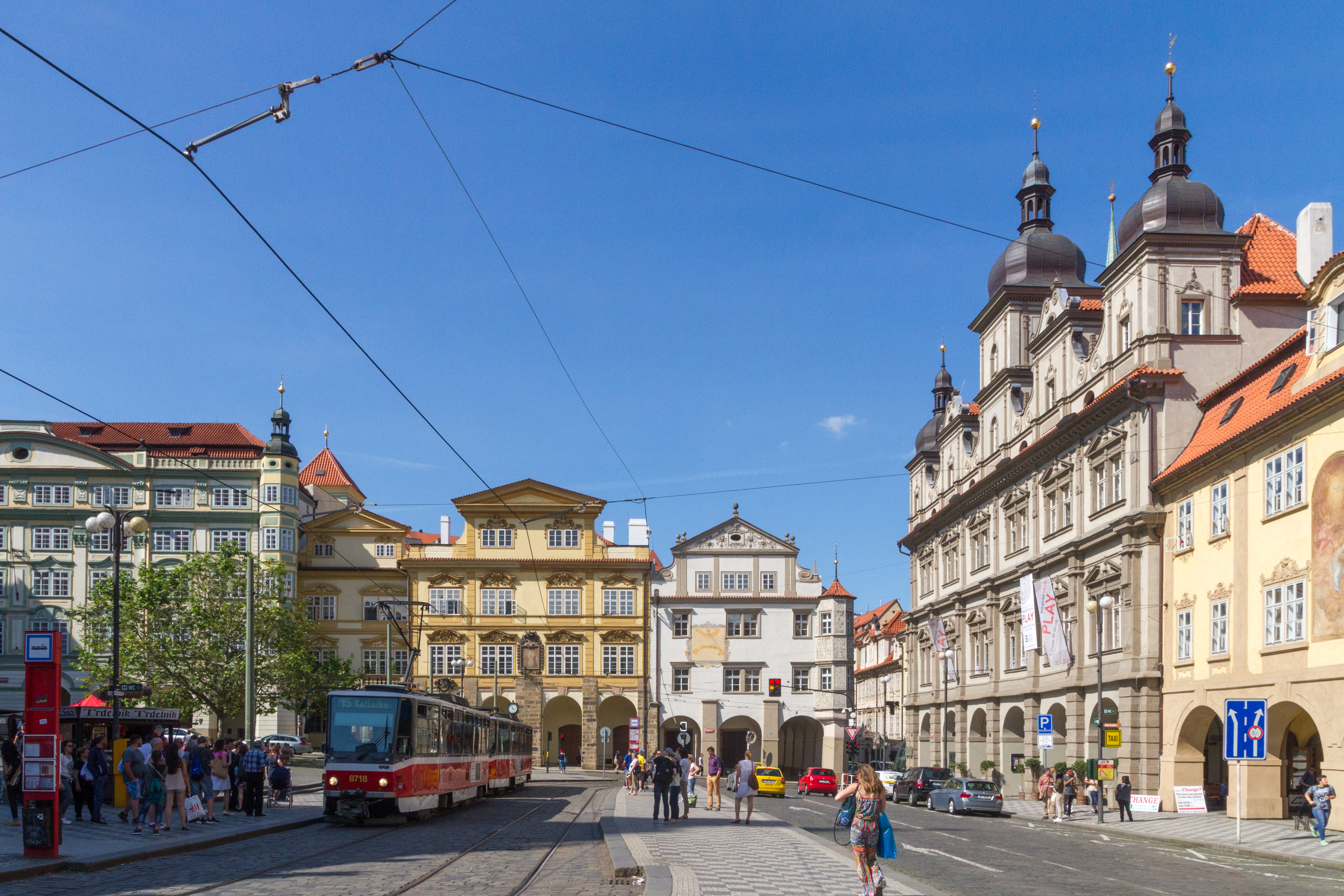
Lower part of the square: Smiřický and Sternberg Palaces on the left, former Malá Strana town hall on the right

St. Nicholas Church and the adjacent building complex divides the square in an upper (western) and lower (eastern) part. From the square Mostecká ulice leads out to the Charles Bridge.

The originally independent Prague town of Lesser Town was founded by the Czech King Otakar II Přemysl in 1257. It was built in the place of older settlements under Prague Castle, by the then only Judith Bridge. From the very beginning, the Lesser Town Ring was its focal point. It served as a marketplace for the castle and as a public meeting place for Lesser Town citizens. The Malá Strana town hall was located here, and the gallows and pillory were also located here in the Middle Ages. The town hall was built in 1470, plundered and destroyed by Swedish troops during the Thirty Years' War and renovated in Baroque style in 1630. The houses surrounding the square mostly belonged to wealthy nobles who built representative houses under the castle.

After the heyday of Lesser Town under Emperor Charles IV and his successors, the town was almost completely burned down during the Hussite Wars in 1419 and was abandoned for a few years. Another catastrophic fire in 1541 destroyed large parts of Lesser Town and even engulfed the castle. After the fires, the houses, originally built in the Gothic style, were rebuilt in the Renaissance style and later in the Baroque style.

When the Jagiellonians moved the royal seat from the old town back to the castle in the 15th century, and especially when Emperor Rudolf II moved his residence from Vienna to Prague in the 16th century, the Lesser Town experienced a new boom. During this time, rich noble families built magnificent palaces on the Lesser Town Square.

A Gothic parish church has stood in the middle of Lesser Town Square since the 13th century. After the victory of the Catholic Habsburgs in the Battle of White Mountain and the beginning of the Counter-Reformation, Emperor Ferdinand II gave the church and the adjacent buildings to the Jesuits. After demolishing the existing buildings, they erected a large complex of buildings in the middle of the square, the Jesuit College. In the 18th century, the monumental baroque church of St. Nicholas was built.

Josephinism led to the departure of many government authorities to Vienna, the nobility gradually abandoned their residences on Malá Strana. The district became impoverished and turned into a quarter of smaller civil servants and craftsmen. For this reason, the Lesser Town was largely spared from radical modernization during the building boom of the 19th and 20th centuries, and the ring has retained its historical shape to this day.
