= Jan Juchelka =

Czech banker & manager (born 1971)

- Born: 19 September 1971 (age 54); Bohumín, Czechoslovakia
- Education: Silesian University in Opava
- Occupation: Banker
- Known for: CEO of Komerční banka

Jan Juchelka (born 19 September 1971) is a Czech banker and manager. He is the CEO of Komerční banka, one of the biggest Czech banks.

== Early life and education ==
Juchelka was born on 19 September 1971 in Bohumín and studied at the Silesian University in Opava, where he earned a degree in economics.

== Career ==
From 1995 until 2005 he worked for the National Property Fund of the Czech Republic, from 2002 to 2005 he was the chairman of its executive committee. He was a member of Komerční banka's (KB) supervisory board from 1999 to 2006. In February 2006, he assumed the position of Director of the Prague Business Division and Member of the Board of Directors of Komerční banka. In August 2012, he moved to the headquarters of the parent company Société Générale (SG), where he was responsible for corporate clients in the region of Central and Eastern Europe, the Middle East and Africa.

In August 2017, Jan Juchelka replaced Albert Le Dirac'h as CEO and chairman of the Board of Directors of Komerční banka, becoming the first Czech to lead Komerční banka after its acquisition by Société Générale in 2001. In August 2018, he launched a process to restructure the bank for greater efficiency and better customer service, which resulted in the reduction of the branch and headquarters network and the layoff of a large number of employees. In August 2022 Juchelka took over the position of chairman of the Komerční banka Jistota Foundation, replacing Tomáš Doležal, who held the position since 2019. Juchelka plans to move the foundation closer to the employees of the Komerční banka to create a stronger collaboration between them.

== Interviews ==
- Jan Juchelka: Interview about the Ukraine war and its impact on Komerční banka.
- Jan Juchelka: Interview about the end of the National Property Fund with the BBC
- Jan Juchelka: Interview about the impact of the Covid-19 Pandemic
